= Capo Grosso Lighthouse =

Lighthouse on the island of Levanzo, Italy

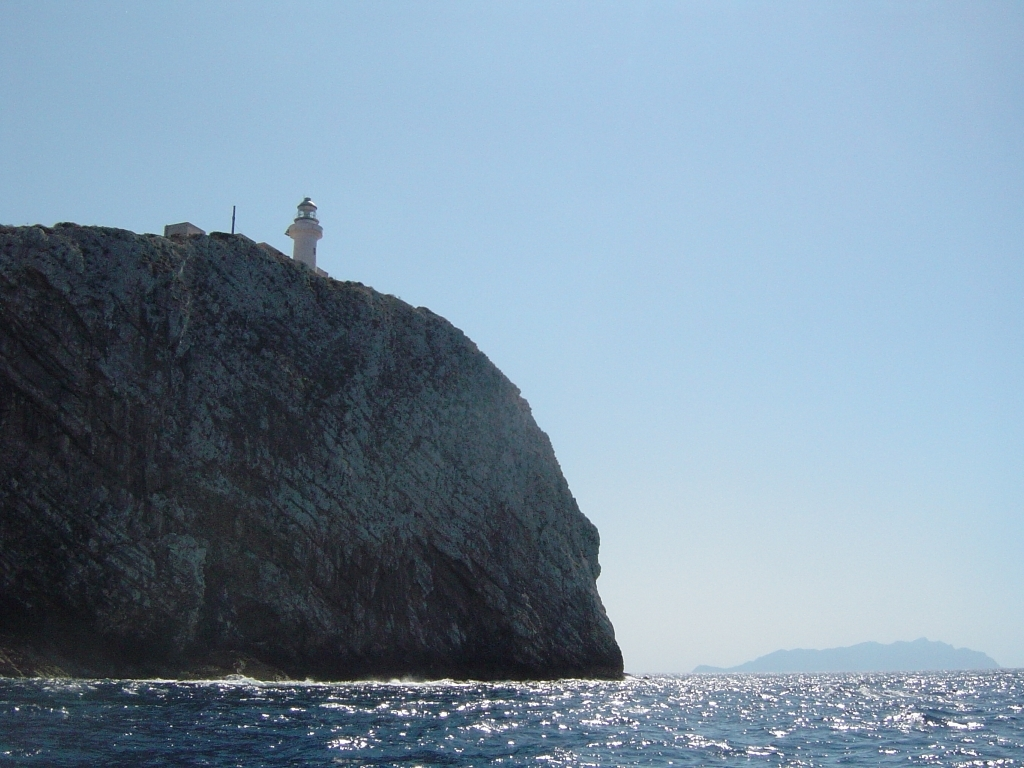
- Location: Capo Grosso; Levanzo; Sicily; Italy
- Coordinates: 38°01′13″N 12°20′03″E

Tower
- Constructed: 1858
- Foundation: concrete base
- Construction: concrete tower
- Height: 12 metres (39 ft)
- Shape: cylindrical tower with balcony and lantern atop a 1-storey keeper’s house
- Markings: white tower, grey lantern dome
- Power source: solar power
- Operator: Marina Militare

Light
- Focal height: 68 metres (223 ft)
- Lens: Type TD 800; Focal length: 400 mm
- Intensity: MAXIHALO-60 II
- Range: 11 nautical miles (20 km; 13 mi)
- Characteristic: Fl (3) W 15s.
- Italy no.: 3120.3 E.F.

Capo Grosso Lighthouse (Faro di Capo Grosso) is an active lighthouse on the Levanzo Island placed at the extremity of Capo Grosso, the northernmost point of the Island.

== Description ==
The lighthouse was built in 1858 in concrete and has a cylindrical shape with balcony and lantern atop a 1-storey keeper's house. The tower is 12 metres (39 ft) high and the lantern is positioned at a height of 68 metres (223 ft) above sea level. The light is fully automated and operated by Marina Militare identified by the Country code number 3120.3 E.F. The lighthouse has a solar power unit and emits an alternating three white flashes in a fifteen seconds period visible up to 11 nautical miles (20 km; 13 mi).

The keeper's house is no longer inhabited and it is in ruin; on October 12, 2015, the Agenzia del Demanio, who run the State ownership buildings, decided to give it in concession to private. The lighthouse has been awarded to a company that deals with investments in the Hotel sector with the intention of transforming the keeper's house in a six-room resort.

== See also ==
- List of lighthouses in Italy
