= Capo d'Anzio Lighthouse =

Capo d'Anzio
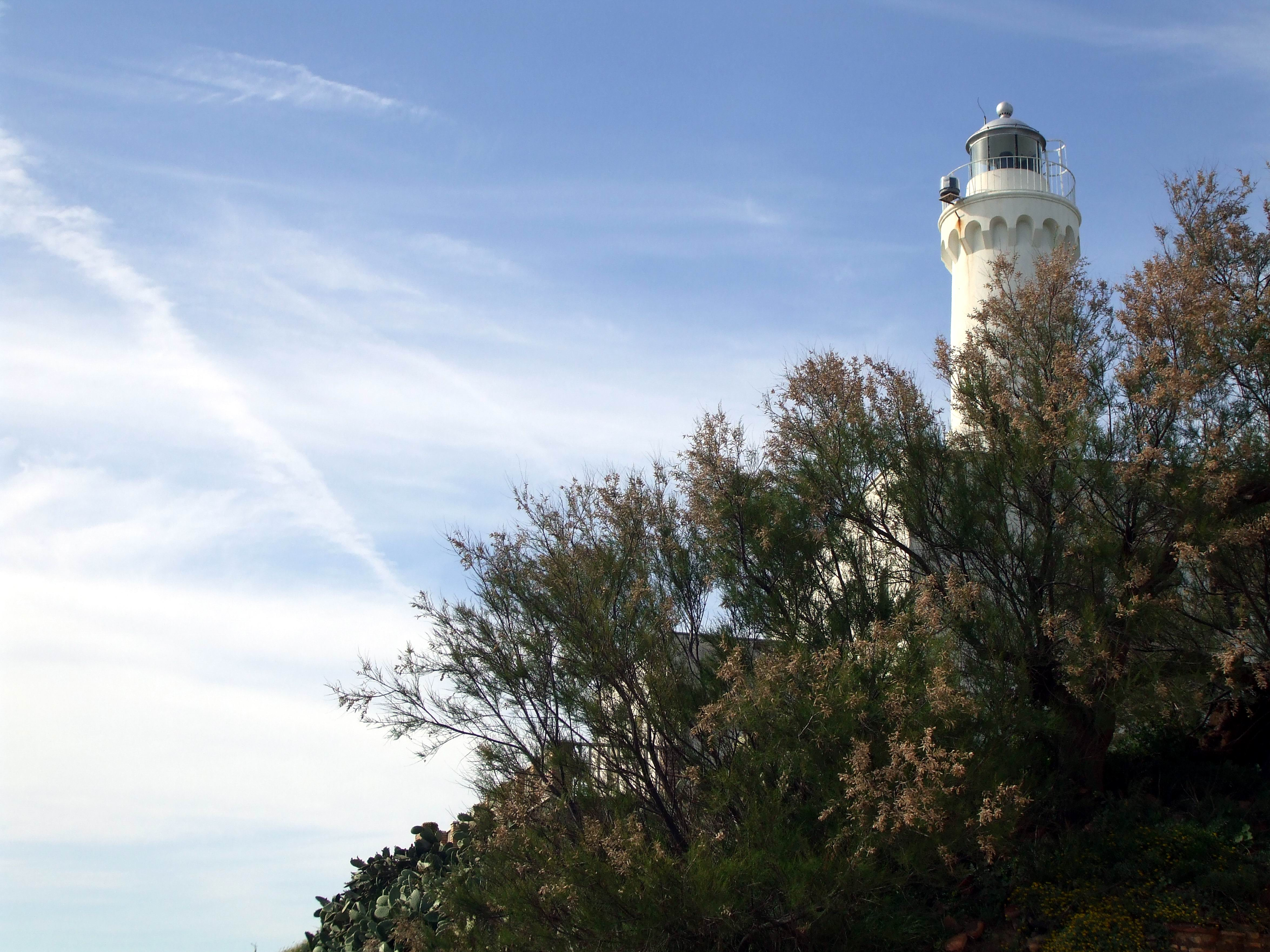
- Capo d'Anzio Lighthouse
- Location: Anzio; Lazio; Italy
- Coordinates: 41°26′45″N 12°37′18″E

Tower
- Constructed: 1866
- Construction: masonry tower
- Automated: yes
- Height: 21 metres (69 ft)
- Shape: cylindrical tower with balcony and lantern atop a 2-storey keeper's house
- Markings: white tower, grey metallic lantern dome
- Power source: mains electricity
- Operator: Marina Militare

Light
- Focal height: 37 metres (121 ft)
- Lens: Type OR D4; Focal length: 187.5 mm
- Intensity: main: AL 1000 W reserve: LABI 100 W
- Range: main: 22 nautical miles (41 km; 25 mi) reserve: 18 nautical miles (33 km; 21 mi)
- Characteristic: Fl (2) W 10s.
- Italy no.: 2246 E.F.

Capo d'Anzio Lighthouse (Italian: Faro di Capo d'Anzio) is an active lighthouse located on the same name Cape on a rocky cliff overlooking the ruins of Nero's villa, close to the town of Anzio, Lazio on the Tyrrhenian Sea.

== Description ==
The construction of the lighthouse began in 1860 by the will of Pope Pius IX but the works ended six years later, in 1866, as it is remembered in a plaque outside the building. The current lighthouse consists of a tower, 21 feet (6.4 m) high, with balcony and lantern, rising from a white keeper's house. The lantern, painted in white and the dome in grey metallic, is positioned at 37 metres (121 ft) above sea level and emits two white flashes in a 10 seconds period, visible up to a distance of 22 nautical miles (41 km; 25 mi). The lighthouse is completely automated and operated by the Marina Militare with the identification code number 2246 E.F.

== See also ==
- List of lighthouses in Italy
- Anzio
