= Ischia Porto Lighthouse =

Lighthouse in Italy

Ischia Porto
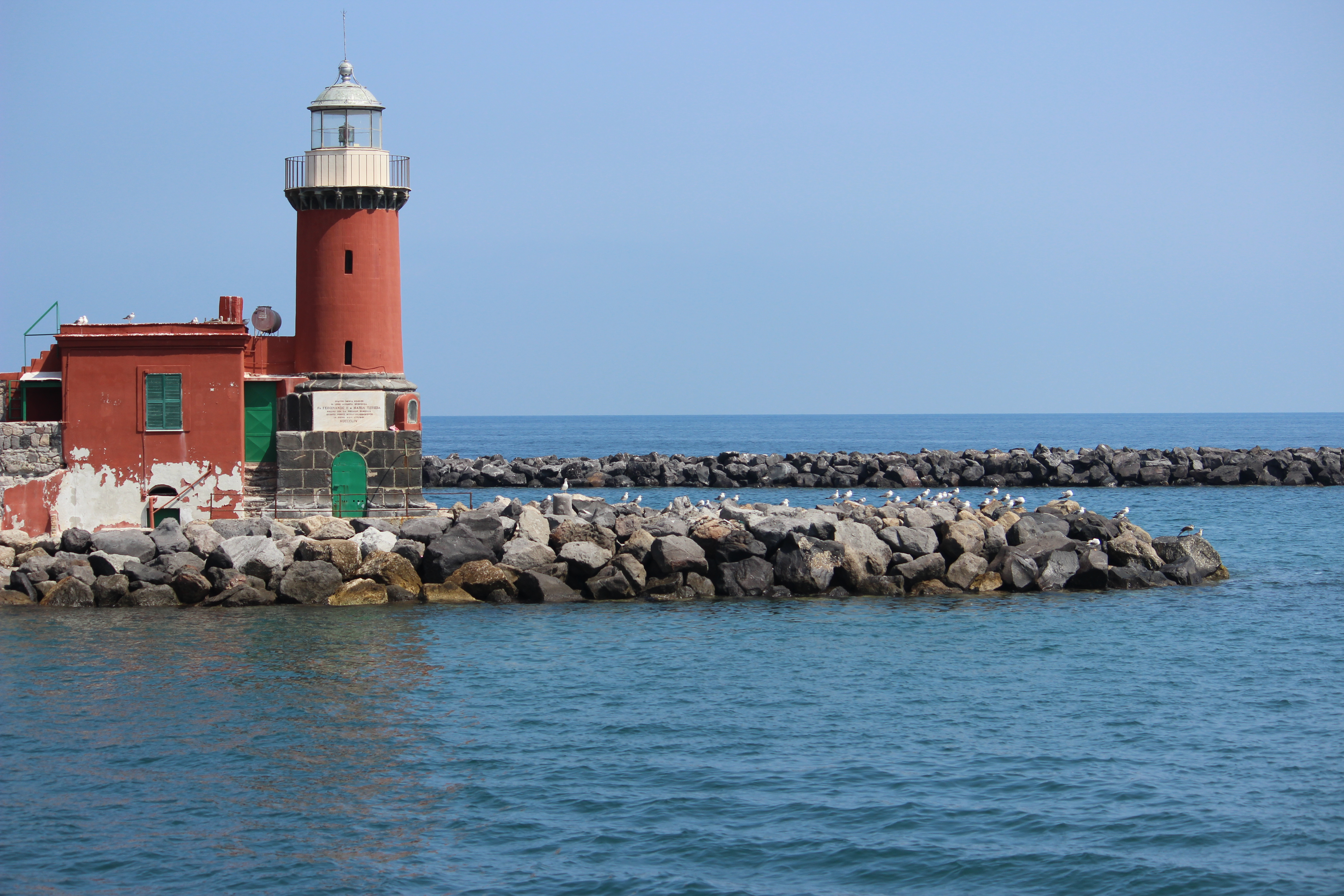
- Ischia Porto Lighthouse
- Location: Ischia; Campania; Italy
- Coordinates: 40°44′53″N 13°56′33″E

Tower
- Constructed: 1868
- Foundation: concrete base
- Construction: masonry tower
- Automated: yes
- Height: 11 metres (36 ft)
- Shape: cylindrical tower with balcony and lantern atop a concrete base
- Markings: red tower, white lantern, grey metallic lantern dome
- Power source: mains electricity
- Operator: Marina Militare

Light
- Focal height: 13 metres (43 ft)
- Lens: Type TD
- Intensity: AL 1000 W
- Range: main: 15 nautical miles (28 km; 17 mi) reserve: 11 nautical miles (20 km; 13 mi)
- Characteristic: Fl WR 3s.
- Italy no.: 2374 E.F.

Ischia Porto Lighthouse (Italian: Faro di Ischia Porto) is an active lighthouse located on the northern end of the western mole of the Port of Ischia, Campania on the Tyrrhenian Sea.

== Description ==
The lighthouse was built in 1868 and consists of a red masonry cylindrical tower, 11 metres (36 ft) high, with balcony and lantern, mounted on a concrete square prism block base; sideways to the tower is a red equipment building. The lantern, painted in white and the dome in grey metallic, is positioned at 13 metres (43 ft) above sea level and emits a red or white flash, depending the direction, in a 3 seconds period, visible up to a distance of 15 nautical miles (28 km; 17 mi). The lighthouse is completely automated and is operated by the Marina Militare with the identification code number 2374 E.F.

== See also ==
- List of lighthouses in Italy
- Ischia
