= Punta di Capel Rosso Lighthouse =

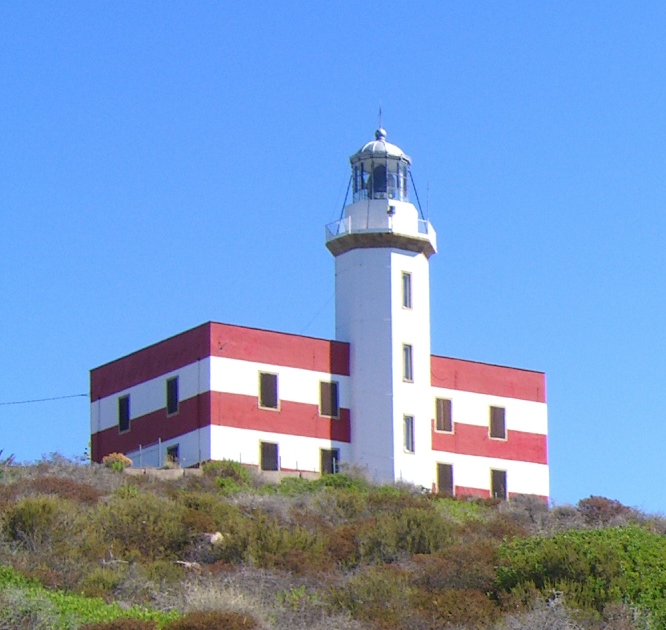
- Location: Grosseto; Tuscany; Italy
- Coordinates: 42°19′15″N 10°55′11″E

Tower
- Constructed: 1883
- Foundation: concrete base
- Construction: concrete and brick tower
- Height: 20 metres (66 ft)
- Shape: hexagonal tower with lantern and gallery attached to the front side of two-storey keeper’s house
- Markings: white tower and lantern, grey metallic lantern dome, keeper's house painted in white and red stripes
- Power source: mains electricity
- Operator: Marina Militare

Light
- Focal height: 90 metres (300 ft)
- Lens: Type OR 700; Focal length: 350 mm
- Intensity: main: AL 1000 W reserve: LABI 100 W
- Range: 23 nautical miles (43 km; 26 mi)
- Characteristic: Fl (4) W 30s.
- Italy no.: 2168 E.F

Punta di Capel Rosso lighthouse (Faro di Punta di Capel Rosso) or Punta Rossa is an active lighthouse on Isola del Giglio on the Tyrrhenian Sea.

== Description ==
The lighthouse was built in 1883 and is placed on Punta di Capel Rosso at a height of 61 metres (200 ft) in the southernmost part of the island. The lighthouse is a two-storey building with a hexagonal plant tower 20 metres (66 ft) high, on the south side, with balcony and lantern; the tower is white and the house is painted in white and red stripes. The lighthouse, operated by Marina Militare with the identification number 2168 E.F, is active and fully automated and emits a four white flashes in a 30 seconds period visible up to 23 nautical miles (43 km; 26 mi).

== See also ==
- List of lighthouses in Italy
