= List of lighthouses in Italy =

The following is a list of active lighthouses in Italy, sorted by region.

== Abruzzo ==
This is a list of lighthouses in Abruzzo.

| Name | Image | Year built | Location & coordinates | Class of Light | Focal height | NGA number | Admiralty number | Range nml |
|---|---|---|---|---|---|---|---|---|
| Giulianova; Molo Nord Lighthouse | Image | n/a | Giulianova; 42°45′18.4″N 13°58′39.3″E | Fl G 5s. | 8 metres (26 ft) | 11164 | E2326 | 4 |
| Giulianova; Molo Sud Lighthouse | Image | n/a | Giulianova; 42°45′19.4″N 13°58′46.1″E | Fl R 5s. | 8 metres (26 ft) | 11156 | E2324 | 4 |
| Ortona Lighthouse | | 1937 | Ortona; 42°21′32.8″N 14°24′30.71″E | Fl (2) W 6s. | 23 metres (75 ft) | 11128 | E2312 | 15 |
| Ortona; Molo Guardiano Nord Lighthouse | | 2012 | Ortona; 42°21′17.82″N 14°25′56.49″E | Fl G 3s. | 9 metres (30 ft) | 11132 | E2313 | 7 |
| Ortona; Molo Martello Lighthouse | Image | 1923 est. | Ortona; 42°21′17.6″N 14°24′52.4″E | F G | 8 metres (26 ft) | 11136 | E2315 | 3 |
| Ortona; Molo Nord Lighthouse | Image | 1955 | Ortona; 42°21′04.29″N 14°25′25.38″E | Fl G 3s. | 9 metres (30 ft) | 11132 | E2313 | 9 |
| Ortona; Molo Sud Lighthouse | Image | 1955 | Ortona; 42°20′55.66″N 14°25′25.7″E | Fl R 3s. | 9 metres (30 ft) | 11140 | E2314 | 9 |
| Pescara Lighthouse | Image | 2006 | Pescara; 42°27′59.4″N 14°13′58.5″E | Fl (3) W 20s. | 12 metres (39 ft) | 11146 | E2316.35 | 17 |
| Pescara; Diga Paolucci Est Lighthouse | Image | 1997 | Pescara; 42°28′19.84″N 14°14′04.54″E | Fl (2) G 10s. | 10 metres (33 ft) | 11143.5 | E2317.2 | 5 |
| Pescara; Diga Paolucci Ovest Lighthouse | Image | 1997 | Pescara; 42°28′25.58″N 14°13′35.93″E | Fl (2) R 10s. | 10 metres (33 ft) | 11143 | E2317 | 5 |
| Pescara; Molo di Maestro Lighthouse | Image | 1912 est. | Pescara; 42°28′10.74″N 14°13′44.72″E | Fl G 4s. | 13 metres (43 ft) | 11152 | E2320 | 8 |
| Pescara; Molo di Scirocco Lighthouse | Image | 1910 est. | Pescara; 42°28′10.35″N 14°13′47.72″E | Fl R 4s. | 13 metres (43 ft) | 11151 | E2319 | 8 |
| Pescara; Molo Nuovo di Levante Lighthouse | Image | 2005 | Pescara; 42°28′14.22″N 14°13′59.41″E | Fl G 5s. | 9 metres (30 ft) | 11145 | E2316 | 4 |
| Punta Penna Lighthouse | | 1948 | Vasto; 42°10′15.9″N 14°42′52.51″E | Fl W 5s. | 84 metres (276 ft) | 11100 | E2306 | 25 |
| Vasto; Molo di Levante Lighthouse | Image | 1956 | Vasto; 42°10′38.58″N 14°42′41.85″E | Fl R 3s. | 9 metres (30 ft) | 11104 | E2307 | 4 |
| Vasto; Molo di Ponente Lighthouse | Image | 1968 | Vasto; 42°10′48.31″N 14°42′43.13″E | Fl G 3s. | 9 metres (30 ft) | 11112 | E2307.5 | 7 |
| Vasto; Molo Diporto Lighthouse | Image | 1956 | Vasto; 42°10′31.59″N 14°42′33.62″E | Fl G 6s. | 9 metres (30 ft) | 11120 | E2307.7 | 4 |
| Vasto; Molo Martello Lighthouse | | 1956 | Vasto; 42°10′34.18″N 14°42′39.48″E | Fl R 6s. | 9 metres (30 ft) | 11108 | E2307.2 | 4 |

== Apulia ==
This is a list of lighthouses in Apulia.

| Name | Image | Year built | Location & coordinates | Class of Light | Focal height | NGA number | Admiralty number | Range nml |
|---|---|---|---|---|---|---|---|---|
| Bari; Molo Pizzoli Lighthouse | | 1904 est. | Bari; 41°08′00.4″N 16°51′44.1″E | not active | 11 metres (36 ft) | | | |
| Bari; Molo Pizzoli Lighthouse | | 2005 | Bari; 41°08′00.4″N 16°51′44.4″E | F G | 8 metres (26 ft) | 10928 | E2242 | 4 |
| Bari; Molo di Ridosso Lighthouse | image | 1951 | Bari; 41°08′24.5″N 16°51′57.8″E | Fl G 5s. | 8 metres (26 ft) | 10916 | E2240 | 3 |
| Bari; Molo San Cataldo Lighthouse | | 1934 est. | Bari; 41°08′31.37″N 16°51′09.43″E | Fl G 3s. | 12 metres (39 ft) | 10908 | E2234 | 7 |
| Bari; Molo San Vito Lighthouse | | 1917 est. | Bari; 41°08′02.7″N 16°51′54.1″E | Fl Y 2s. | 8 metres (26 ft) | 10924 | E2243 | 3 |
| Bari; Nuovo Molo Foraneo; Head Lighthouse | | | Bari; 41°08′52.2″N 16°50′53.7″E | R | | | E2233 | |
| Bari; Nuovo Molo Foraneo terzo braccio Lighthouse | | 1887 est. | Bari; 41°08′37.05″N 16°51′18.26″E | Fl R 5s. | 5 metres (16 ft) | 10900 | E2236 | 4 |
| Bari; Porto Vecchio; Molo San Antonio Lighthouse | Image | 1935 | Bari; 41°07′36.43″N 16°52′46.33″E | Fl G 5s. | 17 metres (56 ft) | 10932 | E2244 | 9 |
| Bari; Vecchio Molo Foraneo Lighthouse | | 1913 | Bari; 41°08′13.1″N 16°51′41.2″E | not active | 11 metres (36 ft) | | | |
| Bari; Vecchio Molo Foraneo Lighthouse | | | Bari; 41°08′13.1″N 16°51′40.9″E | F R | 8 metres (26 ft) | 10920 | E2238 | 4 |
| Barletta; Diga di Levante Lighthouse | Image | 1889 est. | Barletta; 41°20′01.1″N 16°17′41.4″E | Fl R 4s. | 12 metres (39 ft) | 10996 | E2268 | 8 |
| Barletta New Lighthouse | Image | 1958 | Barletta; 41°19′49.9″N 16°17′26.5″E | L Fl (2) W 12s. | 36 metres (118 ft) | 10984 | E2264 | 17 |
| Barletta Lighthouse | Image | 1807 est. | Barletta; 41°19′50.3″N 16°17′27.6″E | Fl G 4s. | 12 metres (39 ft) | 10988 | E2266 | 8 |
| Brindisi; Castello a Mare Lighthouse | Image | 2004 | Brindisi; 40°39′19.4″N 17°58′03.3″E | Fl (4) W 20s. | | 10823.5 | E 2202 | 21 |
| Brindisi; Diga di Castello a Mare Lighthouse | | 1911 | Brindisi; 40°39′11.3″N 17°58′06.6″E | Fl G 3s. | 12 metres (39 ft) | | E 2204 | |
| Capo San Vito Lighthouse | Image | 1869 est. | Taranto; 40°24′42.3″N 17°12′12.9″E | Fl (3) W 15s. | 46 metres (151 ft) | 10640 | E2132 | 22 |
| Capo Santa Maria di Leuca Lighthouse | | 1866 | Santa Maria di Leuca; 39°47′45.4″N 18°22′06.7″E | Fl(3) W 15s. | 102 metres (335 ft) | 10780 | E2176 | 24 |
| Gallipoli; Molo di Tramontana Lighthouse | Image | 2006 | Gallipoli; 40°03′40.7″N 17°58′59.69″E | Fl G 5s. | 11 metres (36 ft) | 10764 | E2172 | 9 |
| Isola Caprara Lighthouse | Image | 1868 est. | Isola Caprara; 42°08′19.9″N 15°31′08.8″E | Fl W 5s. | 23 metres (75 ft) | 11064 | E2296 | 8 |
| Isola Pianosa Lighthouse | Image | 1914 est. | Isola Pianosa; 42°13′31.7″N 15°44′41.2″E | Fl (2) W 10s. | 25 metres (82 ft) | 11060 | E2300 | 10 |
| Isola San Nicola Molo Lighthouse | Image | 1868 est. | Isola San Nicola; 42°07′08.1″N 15°30′06.2″E | 2 F G | 9 metres (30 ft) | 11068 | E2298 | 3 |
| Isola San Nicola Nord Lighthouse | Image | 1980 | Isola San Nicola; 42°07′25.4″N 15°30′33.8″E | Fl (4) W 15s. | 85 metres (279 ft) | 11072 | E2297 | 14 |
| Isola Sant'Andrea Lighthouse | | 1865 | Gallipoli; 40°02′49.8″N 17°56′44.0″E | Fl (2) W 10s. | 45 metres (148 ft) | 10760 | E2168 | 19 |
| Isola Santa Eufemia Lighthouse | | 1867 | Vieste; 41°53′21.2″N 16°11′03.4″E | Fl (3) W 15s. | 40 metres (130 ft) | 11040 | E2288 | 25 |
| Le Pedagne Lighthouse | Image | 1861 | Brindisi; 40°39′28.0″N 17°59′26.5″E | Fl (2) R 6s. | 21 metres (69 ft) | 10816 | E2196 | 8 |
| Manfredonia Lighthouse | | 1868 | Manfredonia; 41°37′43.5″N 15°55′24.0″E | Fl W 5s. | 20 metres (66 ft) | 11012 | E2276 | 23 |
| Manfredonia; Molo di Levante Lighthouse | | 1935 est. | Manfredonia; 41°37′14.4″N 15°55′31.22″E | Fl G 3s. | 14 metres (46 ft) | 11016 | E2277 | 7 |
| Manfredonia; Molo di Ponente Lighthouse | Image | 1937 est. | Manfredonia; 41°37′18.65″N 15°55′20.05″E | Fl R 3s. | 12 metres (39 ft) | 11020 | E2278 | 7 |
| Mola di Bari; Molo di Levante Lighthouse | Image | 2003 | Mola di Bari; 41°03′44.46″N 17°06′05.12″E | Fl R 3s. | 14 metres (46 ft) | 10880 | E2228.5 | 8 |
| Mola di Bari; Molo Nord Lighthouse | Image | 1901 est. | Mola di Bari; 41°03′40.08″N 17°05′57.9″E | Fl G 3s. | 13 metres (43 ft) | 10872 | E2226 | 8 |
| Mola di Bari; Braccio di Levante Lighthouse | Image | 1953 est, | Mola di Bari; 41°03′37.9″N 17°05′48.1″E | F R | 8 metres (26 ft) | 10876 | E2228 | 4 |
| Molfetta Lighthouse | | 1857 | Molfetta; 41°12′29.0″N 16°35′39.3″E | Iso W 6s. | 22 metres (72 ft) | 10952 | E2248 | 16 |
| Molfetta; Molo Foraneo Lighthouse | Image | 1901 | Molfetta; 41°12′46.36″N 16°35′28.95″E | Fl R 5s. | 12 metres (39 ft) | 10956 | E2252 | 7 |
| Molfetta; Molo Pennello Lighthouse | Image | 1919 est. | Molfetta; 41°12′29.37″N 16°35′27.62″E | F G | 5 metres (16 ft) | 10964 | E2254 | 4 |
| Monopoli; Diga di Tramontana Lighthouse | Image | 1931 est. | Monopoli; 40°57′21.94″N 17°18′31.72″E | Fl G 3s. | 13 metres (43 ft) | 10872 | E2226 | 8 |
| Monopoli; Molo Margherita Lighthouse | | 1878 | Monopoli; 40°57′20.9″N 17°18′17.01″E | Fl R 3s. | 15 metres (49 ft) | 10868 | E2224 | 8 |
| Punta Craul Lighthouse | Image | 1903 est. | Otranto; 40°09′11.9″N 18°29′30.7″E | Fl (3) WR 10s. | 12 metres (39 ft) | 10792 | E2182 | white: 13 red: 8 |
| Punta del Diavolo Lighthouse | | 1905 est. | Isola San Domino; 42°06′23.5″N 15°28′38.5″E | Fl (3) W 10s. | 48 metres (157 ft) | 11076 | E2294 | 11 |
| Punta Palascia Lighthouse | | 1867 | Capo d'Otranto; 40°06′26.72″N 18°31′11.56″E | Fl W 5s. | 60 metres (200 ft) | 10788 | E2178 | 18 |
| Punta San Cataldo di Bari Lighthouse | | 1869 | Bari; 41°08′21.0″N 16°50′42.2″E | Fl (3) W 20s. | 66 metres (217 ft) | 10892 | E2232 | 24 |
| Punta San Cataldo di Lecce Lighthouse | | 1897 | Lecce; 40°23′26.9″N 18°18′24.2″E | L Fl W 5s. | 25 metres (82 ft) | 10808 | E2192 | 16 |
| Punta Torre Canne Lighthouse | | 1929 | Torre Canne; 40°50′30.8″N 17°28′08.0″E | Fl (2) W 10s. | 35 metres (115 ft) | 10856 | E2222 | 16 |
| Torre Preposti Lighthouse | Image | 1946 | Pugnochiuso; 41°46′57.0″N 16°11′32.2″E | Fl W 5s. | 62 metres (203 ft) | 11036 | E2286 | 15 |
| Torre San Giovanni di Ugento Lighthouse | | 1932 | Torre San Giovanni; 39°53′11.0″N 18°06′49.6″E | Iso WR 4s. | 24 metres (79 ft) | 10776 | E2174 | white: 15 red: 11 |
| Torre Sant'Andrea di Missipezza Lighthouse | | 1932 | Torre Sant'Andrea; 40°15′19.01″N 18°26′41.95″E | Fl (2) WR 7s. | 24 metres (79 ft) | 10800 | E2188 | white: 15 red: 12 |
| Trani; Braccio di San Nicola Lighthouse | Image | 1912 est. | Trani; 41°17′04.53″N 16°25′26.57″E | L Fl G 5s. | 10 metres (33 ft) | 10980 | E2262 | 8 |
| Trani; Molo San Antonio Lighthouse | Image | 1952 | Trani; 41°16′53.3″N 16°25′19.6″E | L Fl R 5s. | 10 metres (33 ft) | 10972 | E2261 | 8 |
| Trani; Molo San Antonio end Lighthouse | Image | 1885 | Trani; 41°16′57.98″N 16°25′21.48″E | Fl W 5s. | 9 metres (30 ft) | 10976 | E2260 | 14 |
| Vieste; Molo San Lorenzo Lighthouse | Image | 1977 | Vieste; 41°53′16.9″N 16°10′37.37″E | F R | 7 metres (23 ft) | 11044 | E2288.4 | 3 |
| Vieste; Porto Rifugio Molo di Sopraflutto Lighthouse | Image | n/a | Vieste; 41°53′24.15″N 16°10′46.27″E | Fl G 3s. | 10 metres (33 ft) | n/a | n/a | 8 |
| Vieste; Porto Rifugio Molo Foraneo Lighthouse | Image | n/a | Vieste; 41°53′26.46″N 16°10′54.59″E | Fl R 3s. | 10 metres (33 ft) | n/a | n/a | 8 |

== Calabria ==
This is a list of lighthouses in Calabria.

| Name | Image | Year built | Location & coordinates | Class of Light | Focal height | NGA number | Admiralty number | Range nml |
|---|---|---|---|---|---|---|---|---|
| Capo Bonifati Lighthouse | Image | 1929 est. | Bonifati; 39°32′41.4″N 15°52′59.8″E | Fl (2) W 10s. | 63 metres (207 ft) | 9676 | E1750 | 15 |
| Capo Colonne Lighthouse | | 1873 | Capo Colonna; 39°01′32.4″N 17°12′16.2″E | Fl W 5s. | 40 metres (130 ft) | 10600 | E2118 | 24 |
| Capo dell'Armi Lighthouse | | 1867 | Motta San Giovanni; 37°57′15.5″N 15°40′44.6″E | Fl (2) W 10s. | 95 metres (312 ft) | 9744 | E1780 | 22 |
| Capo Rizzuto Lighthouse | | 1906 | Isola di Capo Rizzuto; 38°53′42.7″N 17°05′34.3″E | L Fl (2) WR 10s. | 37 metres (121 ft) | 10596 | E2112 | white: 17 red: 13 |
| Capo Spartivento Calabro Lighthouse | | 1867 | Palizzi; 37°55′32.6″N 16°03′38.4″E | Fl W 8s. | 63 metres (207 ft) | 10584 | E2108 | 24 |
| Capo Suvero Lighthouse | Image | 1984 | Gizzeria; 38°57′07.8″N 16°09′27.8″E | Fl (2) W 10s. | 58 metres (190 ft) | 9684 | E1756 | 16 |
| Capo Vaticano Lighthouse | | 1885 | Capo Vaticano; 38°37′09.8″N 15°49′43.3″E | Fl (4) W 20. | 108 metres (354 ft) | 9704 | E1762 | 24 |
| Crotone; Molo Sanità Lighthouse | Image | 1973 | Crotone; 39°04′42.3″N 17°08′09.4″E | Fl (2) R 5s. | 9 metres (30 ft) | 10608 | E2123 | 8 |
| Crotone; Molo Vecchio Lighthouse | Image | 1873 est. | Crotone; 39°04′39.7″N 17°08′14.2″E | Fl (2) G 5s. | 11 metres (36 ft) | 10604 | E2122 | 8 |
| Paola Lighthouse | Image | 1929 | Paola; 39°21′44.6″N 16°01′53.3″E | Fl (3) 15s. | 53 metres (174 ft) | 9680 | E1752 | 15 |
| Punta Alice Lighthouse | Image | 1896 | Cirò Marina; 39°23′5.9″N 17°09′12.7″E | Fl (2) 10s. | 31 metres (102 ft) | 10624 | E2128 | 16 |
| Punta Pezzo Lighthouse | | 1953 | Punta Pezzo; 38°13′51.9″N 15°38′11.5″E | Fl (3) W 15s. | 26 metres (85 ft) | 9720 | E1770 | 15 |
| Punta Stilo Lighthouse | | 1895 | Monasterace; 38°26′51.2″N 16°34′39.0″E | Fl (3) W 15s. | 54 metres (177 ft) | 10584 | E2108 | 22 |
| Reggio Calabria; Molo di Ponente Lighthouse | Image | 1883 est. | Reggio Calabria; 38°07′41.7″N 15°38′57.8″E | Iso G 2s. | 14 metres (46 ft) | 9736 | E1776 | 7 |
| Reggio Calabria; Molo Sottoflutto Lighthouse | Image | 1883 est. | Reggio Calabria; 38°07′38.4″N 15°39′04.3″E | Iso R 2s. | 11 metres (36 ft) | 9740 | E1777 | 6 |
| Scilla Lighthouse | | 1913 | Scilla; 38°15′22.7″N 15°42′52.4″E | Fl W 5s. | 72 metres (236 ft) | 9708 | E1766 | 22 |
| Vibo Marina; Calata Buccarelli Lighthouse | Image | 1952 | Vibo Marina; 38°43′27.6″N 16°07′42.6″E | Fl WG 5s. | 17 metres (56 ft) | 9692 | E1757 | 15 |
| Villa San Giovanni; Molo di Ponente Lighthouse | Image | 1901 est. | Villa San Giovanni; 38°13′07.3″N 15°37′47.7″E | Fl G 3s. | 14 metres (46 ft) | 9724 | E1772 | 7 |

== Campania ==
This is a list of lighthouses in Campania.

| Name | Image | Year built | Location & coordinates | Class of Light | Focal height | NGA number | Admiralty number | Range nml |
|---|---|---|---|---|---|---|---|---|
| Antemurale Thaon De Revel Lighthouse | Image | n/a | Naples; 40°50′01.21″N 14°16′35.53″E | Fl G 4s. | 18 metres (59 ft) | 9464 | E1648 | 9 |
| Capo d'Orso Lighthouse | | 1992 | Maiori; 40°37′59.5″N 14°40′50.9″E | Fl (3) W 15s. | 66 metres (217 ft) | 9600 | E1722 | 16 |
| Capo Miseno Lighthouse | | 1954 | Bacoli; 40°46′42.06″N 14°05′20.1″E | Fl (2) W 10s. | 80 metres (260 ft) | 9380 | E1620 | 16 |
| Capo Palinuro Lighthouse | | 1870 | Palinuro; 40°01′28.5″N 15°16′26.7″E | Fl (3) W 15s. | 206 metres (676 ft) | 9652 | E1741 | 25 |
| Capo Tiberio Lighthouse | | 1922 est. | Anacapri; 37°34′36.8″N 15°10′34.2″E | Fl (2) w 10s. | 12 metres (39 ft) | 9576 | E1708 | 7 |
| Castellammare di Stabia Lighthouse | Image | 1870 | Castellammare di Stabia; 40°41′19.51″N 14°28′12.83″E | Fl (2) W 10s. | 114 metres (374 ft) | 9540 | E1692 | 16 |
| Castello d'Ischia Lighthouse | | 1913 | Ischia; 40°43′55.7″N 13°57′56.5″E | L Fl W 6s. | 82 metres (269 ft) | 9356 | E1614 | 16 |
| Diga Duca degli Abruzzi Lighthouse | Image | n/a | Naples; 40°02′55.0″N 15°29′25.1″E | Fl R 3s. | 15 metres (49 ft) | 9465 | E1647.5 | 4 |
| Fortino Tenaglia Lighthouse | | 1856 est. | Bacoli; 40°48′43.62″N 14°04′56.44″E | Iso R 4s. | 13 metres (43 ft) | 9384 | E1622 | 8 |
| Ischia Porto Lighthouse | | 1868 | Ischia; 40°44′53.39″N 13°56′32.73″E | Fl WR 3s. | 13 metres (43 ft) | 9344 | E1608 | white: 15 red: 12 |
| Isolotti Li Galli Lighthouse | image | 1935 | Positano; 40°34′58.69″N 14°26′01.4″E | Fl W 5s. | 67 metres (220 ft) | 9588 | E1716 | 6 |
| Isolotto Licosa Lighthouse | Image | 1951 | Licosa; 40°15′05.0″N 14°54′00.8″E | Fl (2) W 10s. | 13 metres (43 ft) | 9636 | E1738 | 11 |
| Molo Caligoliano Lighthouse | Image | 2010 | Pozzuoli; 40°49′22.63″N 14°06′35.35″E | Iso G 4s. | 13 metres (43 ft) | n/a | E1625 | 6 |
| Molo San Vincenzo Lighthouse | | 1916 | Naples; 40°49′58.31″N 14°16′19.46″E | Fl (3) W 15s. | 25 metres (82 ft) | 9475 | E1646 | 22 |
| Portici Banchina Lighthouse | Image | 1869 est. | Portici; 40°48′36.58″N 14°20′00.24″E | Fl W 3s. | 16 metres (52 ft) | 9516 | E1678 | 11 |
| Punta Campanella Lighthouse | | 1972 | Massa Lubrense; 40°34′10.11″N 14°19′29.72″E | Fl W 5s. | 65 metres (213 ft) | 9568 | E1702 | 10 |
| Punta Carena Lighthouse | | 1867 | Anacapri; 40°32′10.46″N 14°11′55.5″E | Fl W 3s. | 73 metres (240 ft) | 9572 | E1706 | 25 |
| Punta del Fortino Lighthouse | | 1915 | Sapri; 40°04′08.6″N 15°37′06.6″E | Fl (2) W 7s. | 13 metres (43 ft) | 9664 | E1746 | 7 |
| Punta Fortino Lighthouse | | 1915 | Agropoli; 40°21′17.8″N 14°59′13.2″E | Fl (2) W 6s. | 42 metres (138 ft) | 9632 | E1765 | 16 |
| Punta Imperatore Lighthouse | | 1916 | Forio; 40°42′40.14″N 13°51′09.03″E | Fl (2) W 15s. | 164 metres (538 ft) | 9328 | E1598 | 22 |
| Punta Pioppeto Lighthouse | | 1849 | Procida; 40°46′13.44″N 14°01′00.62″E | Fl (3) W 10s. | 21 metres (69 ft) | 9364 | E1618 | 11 |
| Salerno; Molo di Levante Lighthouse | Image | 1975 | Salerno; 40°39′49.24″N 14°44′38.75″E | Fl G 5s. | 13 metres (43 ft) | 9612 | E1730.2 | 9 |
| Salerno; Molo di Ponente Lighthouse | Image | 1975 | Salerno; 40°39′59.91″N 14°44′48.12″E | Fl R 5s. | 13 metres (43 ft) | 9616 | E1730.4 | 8 |
| Scario Lighthouse | Image | 1883 | San Giovanni a Piro; 40°02′55.0″N 15°29′25.1″E | Fl (4) W 12s. | 24 metres (79 ft) | 9660 | E1742 | 15 |

== Emilia-Romagna ==
This is a list of lighthouses in Emilia-Romagna.

| Name | Image | Year built | Location & coordinates | Class of Light | Focal height | NGA number | Admiralty number | Range nml |
|---|---|---|---|---|---|---|---|---|
| Cattolica; Molo di Ponente Lighthouse | Image | 1868 est. | Cattolica; 43°58′10.6″N 12°45′02.0″E | Fl G 3s. | 10 metres (33 ft) | 11316 | E2384 | 8 |
| Cervia Lighthouse | | 1875 | Cervia; 44°15′59.4″N 12°21′17.3″E | Iso W 2s. | 16 metres (52 ft) | 11352 | E2411 | 11 |
| Cesenatico Lighthouse | | 1892 est. | Cesenatico; 44°12′22.0″N 12°24′05.8″E | Fl (2) W 6s. | 18 metres (59 ft) | 11340 | E2404 | 15 |
| Cesenatico; Molo Est Lighthouse | Image | 1910 est. | Cesenatico; 44°12′31.6″N 12°24′19.0″E | Fl R 5s. | 8 metres (26 ft) | 11344 | E2405 | 8 |
| Cesenatico; Molo Ovest Lighthouse | Image | 1908 est. | Cesenatico; 44°12′31.5″N 12°24′16.2″E | Fl G 5s. | 8 metres (26 ft) | 11348 | E2406 | 8 |
| Porto Corsini Lighthouse | Image | 1862 est. | Ravenna; 44°29′31.1″N 12°17′03.2″E | Fl W 5s. | 35 metres (115 ft) | 11376 | E2418 | 20 |
| Porto di Po di Goro Lighthouse | | 1950 | Goro; 44°47′28.7″N 12°23′47.5″E | Fl (2) W 10s. | 22 metres (72 ft) | 11428 | E2434 | 17 |
| Porto Garibaldi; Molo Nord Lighthouse | | 1959 | Comacchio; 44°40′33.8″N 12°14′40.3″E | Fl (4) W 15s. | 14 metres (46 ft) | 11400 | E2426 | 15 |
| Rimini Lighthouse | | 1852 est. | Rimini; 44°04′26.6″N 12°34′26.2″E | Fl (3) W 12s. | 27 metres (89 ft) | 11324 | E2394 | 15 |
| Rimini; Darsena Turistica Lighthouse | Image | 1911 est. | Rimini; 44°04′44.5″N 12°34′28.2″E | Fl G 3s. | 7 metres (23 ft) | n/a | n/a | 8 |
| Rimini; Molo Est Lighthouse | Image | n/a | Rimini; 44°04′54.0″N 12°34′27.9″E | Fl R 3s. | 7 metres (23 ft) | n/a | n/a | 8 |
| Rimini; Molo di Levante Lighthouse | Image | 1914 est. | Rimini; 44°04′54.3″N 12°34′35.8″E | Fl (2) Y 6s. | 8 metres (26 ft) | 11328 | E2396 | 3 |
| Rimini; Scogliera Paraonde Lighthouse | Image | 2015 | Rimini; 44°04′44.2″N 12°34′14.4″E (1) | Fl (2) Y 2s. | 8 metres (26 ft) | n/a | n/a | n/a |

(1) Light visible in the satellite view not in 3D

== Friuli-Venezia Giulia ==
This is a list of lighthouses in Friuli-Venezia Giulia.

| Name | Image | Year built | Location & coordinates | Class of Light | Focal height | NGA number | Admiralty number | Range nml |
|---|---|---|---|---|---|---|---|---|
| Grado; Canale di Belvedre Lighthouse | Image | 1926 est. | Grado; 45°41′01.2″N 13°22′38.4″E | F G | 7 metres (23 ft) | 11528 | E2536 | 3 |
| Grado; Canale lato Sud Lighthouse | Image | 1926 est. | Grado; 45°41′04.78″N 13°22′31.97″E | Fl G 3s. | 5 metres (16 ft) | 11620 | E2530 | 3 |
| Grado; Canale lato Ovest Lighthouse | Image | 1926 est. | Grado; 45°40′48.4″N 13°22′07.85″E | Fl Wr 3s. | 5 metres (16 ft) | 11612 | E2526 | 7 |
| Grado congiunzione Canali San Pietro d’Orio Lighthouse | Image | 1926 est. | Grado; 45°41′04.13″N 13°22′20.49″E | Fl (2) R 6s. | 5 metres (16 ft) | 11616 | E2528 | 4 |
| Grado; Pontile Darsena Lighthouse | Image | 1911 est. | Grado; 45°41′00.6″N 13°22′36.7″E | F R | 7 metres (23 ft) | 11624 | E2534 | 3 |
| Lignano Sabbiadoro; Molo estremità Lighthouse | | 1928 est. | Lignano Sabbiadoro; 45°41′54.23″N 13°09′16.05″E | Fl R 2s. | 7 metres (23 ft) | 11576 | E2521 | 8 |
| Porto Buso; Diga lato Est Lighthouse | Image | 1980 | Marano lagoon 45°42′18.56″N 13°15′15.36″E | Fl G 5s. | 5 metres (16 ft) | 11596 | E2524.7 | 4 |
| Porto Buso; Diga lato Ovest Lighthouse | Image | 1980 | Marano lagoon 45°42′26.54″N 13°14′52.82″E | Fl R 5s. | 5 metres (16 ft) | 11600 | E2524.5 | 4 |
| Punta Sdobba Lighthouse | Image | 1933 est. | Monfalcone; 45°43′17.86″N 13°34′17.89″E | Fl R 5s. | 7 metres (23 ft) | 11634 | E2540 | 4 |
| Trieste; Bacino Secchetta estremità Nord Lighthouse | Image | 1963 est. | Trieste; 45°38′59.19″N 13°45′34.07″E | Fl (2) G 4s. | 7 metres (23 ft) | 11708 | E2576 | 5 |
| Trieste; Diga Porto Franco Vecchio Lighthouse | Image | 1903 est. | Trieste; 45°39′47.64″N 13°45′32.14″E | F G | 7 metres (23 ft) | 11684 | E2561 | 8 |
| Trieste; Diga Porto Franco Vecchio estremità Nord Lighthouse | Image | 1891 est. | Trieste; 45°39′50.75″N 13°45′25.65″E | Fl G 3s. | 8 metres (26 ft) | 11688 | E2562 | 8 |
| Trieste; Diga Porto Franco Vecchio estremità Sud Lighthouse | Image | 1891 est. | Trieste; 45°39′18.8″N 13°45′44.4″E | Fl R 3s. | 7 metres (23 ft) | 11680 | E2560 | 6 |
| Trieste; Diga Luigi Rizzo di mezzo estremità Nord Lighthouse | Image | 1912 est. | Trieste; 45°38′14.0″N 13°44′12.5″E | Fl G 3s. | 9 metres (30 ft) | 11724 | E2580 | 5 |
| Trieste; Diga Luigi Rizzo di mezzo estremità Sud Lighthouse | Image | 1912 est. | Trieste; 45°37′58.3″N 13°44′16.2″E | Iso R 2s. | 9 metres (30 ft) | 11728 | E2582 | 5 |
| Trieste; Diga Luigi Rizzo Nord estremità Nord Lighthouse | Image | 1910 est. | Trieste; 45°38′48.3″N 13°44′14.2″E | Fl (2) G 6s. | 9 metres (30 ft) | 11708 | E2576 | 5 |
| Trieste; Diga Luigi Rizzo Nord estremità Sud Lighthouse | Image | 1907 est. | Trieste; 45°38′19.2″N 13°44′21.2″E | Fl R 3s. | 9 metres (30 ft) | 11712 | E2578 | 8 |
| Trieste; Diga Luigi Rizzo Sud estremità Nord Lighthouse | Image | 1921 est, | Trieste; 45°37′53.1″N 13°44′07.7″E | Iso G 2s. | 6 metres (20 ft) | 11732 | E2586 | 5 |
| Trieste; Diga Luigi Rizzo Sud estremità Sud Lighthouse | Image | 1912 est. | Trieste; 45°37′02.2″N 13°44′19.6″E | Fl (3) R 10s. | 9 metres (30 ft) | 11736 | E2587 | 5 |
| Trieste; Porto di Lido Lighthouse | Image | 1953 est. | Trieste; 45°38′54.67″N 13°45′04.01″E | Fl R 5s. | 7 metres (23 ft) | n/a | n/a | 5 |
| Vittoria Light | | 1927 | Trieste; 45°40′32.27″N 13°45′25.16″E | Fl (2) W 10s. | 115 metres (377 ft) | 11676 | E2558 | 22 |

== Lazio ==
This is a list of lighthouses in Lazio.

| Name | Image | Year built | Location & coordinates | Class of Light | Focal height | NGA number | Admiralty number | Range nml |
|---|---|---|---|---|---|---|---|---|
| Anzio; Molo Frangiflutti Lighthouse | Image | n/a | Anzio; 41°26′37.0″N 12°38′17.1″E | Fl R 3s. | 10 metres (33 ft) | 9196 | E1540.5 | 5 |
| Anzio; Molo Sottoflutto Lighthouse | Image | 1978 | Anzio; 41°26′46.2″N 12°38′04.8″E | F G | 8 metres (26 ft) | n/a | n/a | n/a |
| Capo d'Anzio Lighthouse | | 1866 | Anzio; 41°26′45.05″N 12°37′18.5″E | Fl (2) W 10s. | 37 metres (121 ft) | 9192 | E1538 | 22 |
| Capo Circeo Lighthouse | | 1866 | San Felice Circeo; 41°13′20.4″N 13°04′06.6″E | Fl W 5s. | 38 metres (125 ft) | 9244 | E1542 | 23 |
| Civitavecchia; Antemurale Colombo Lighthouse | Image | n/a | Civitavecchia; 42°06′23.1″N 11°45′47.3″E | Fl G 3s. | 15 metres (49 ft) | 9140 | E1509.5 | 8 |
| Civitavecchia; Banchina Compagnia Roma Lighthouse | Image | 1965 | Civitavecchia; 42°06′25.8″N 11°46′05.4″E | Fl R 4s. | 9 metres (30 ft) | 9148 | E1514 | 8 |
| Civitavecchia; Banchina XIV Maggio Lighthouse | | 1981 | Civitavecchia; 42°06′25.8″N 11°46′05.4″E | F R | 8 metres (26 ft) | 9152 | E1513 | 3 |
| Civitavecchia; Molo Cialdi Lighthouse | Image | 2004 | Civitavecchia; 42°05′28.8″N 11°47′13.0″E | F R | 8 metres (26 ft) | 9153 | E1518.2 | 3 |
| Civitavecchia; Molo del Lazzeretto Lighthouse | Image | 1900 est. | Civitavecchia; 42°05′34.9″N 11°47′08.7″E | F R | 8 metres (26 ft) | 9156 | E1518 | 3 |
| Civitavecchia; Monte Cappuccini Lighthouse | Image | 1951 | Civitavecchia; 42°05′54.34″N 11°49′00.69″E | Fl (2) W 10s. | 125 metres (410 ft) | 9132 | E1508 | 24 |
| Capo Negro Lighthouse | Image | 1884 | Zannone; 40°58′24.18″N 13°03′17.77″E | Fl (3) W 10s. | 37 metres (121 ft) | 9216 | E1577 | 12 |
| Formia; Molo Sopraflutto Lighthouse | Image | n/a | Formia; 41°15′12.3″N 13°36′53.6″E | Fl WR 3s. | 11 metres (36 ft) | 9304 | E1573 | white: 11 red: 8 |
| Formia; Molo Sottoflutto Lighthouse | Image | 1961 | Formia; 41°15′16.9″N 13°36′46.0″E | Fl G 3s. | 9 metres (30 ft) | 9308 | E1572 | 7 |
| Gaeta; Banchina Salvo D'Acquisto Lighthouse | Image | n/a | Gaeta; 41°13′56.1″N 13°34′23.8″E | Fl (2) W 10s. | 10 metres (33 ft) | 9294 | E1568 | 7 |
| Gaeta; Molo San Antonio Lighthouse | Image | 1920 est. | Gaeta; 41°12′38.2″N 13°35′21.7″E | Fl R 3s. | 10 metres (33 ft) | 9272 | E1562 | 6 |
| Gaeta; Porto Salvo Molo Lighthouse | Image | n/a | Gaeta; 41°13′15.0″N 13°34′21.9″E | Fl G 3s. | 8 metres (26 ft) | 9276 | E1564 | 7 |
| Monte Orlando Lighthouse | Image | 1954 | Gaeta; 41°12′24.2″N 13°34′39.19″E | Fl (3) W 15s. | 185 metres (607 ft) | 9264 | E1558 | 23 |
| Ponza; Scogliera di Protezione Lighthouse | Image | n/a | Ponza; 40°53′46.8″N 12°57′51.9″E | Fl R 3s. | 8 metres (26 ft) | 9236 | E1583 | 8 |
| Porto di Ponza Lighthouse | Image | n/a | Ponza; 40°53′44.09″N 12°57′52.83″E | Fl Y 3s. | 12 metres (39 ft) | 9232 | E1584 | 9 |
| Punta della Guardia Lighthouse | Image | 1886 | Ponza; 40°52′40.2″N 12°57′09.13″E | Fl (3) W 30s. | 112 metres (367 ft) | 9224 | E1588 | 24 |
| Punta dello Stendardo Lighthouse | Image | 1857 est. | Gaeta; 41°12′38.2″N 13°35′21.7″E | Fl (2) R 10s. | 20 metres (66 ft) | 9268 | E1560 | 7 |
| Punta Varo Lighthouse | Image | 1975 | Zannone; 40°57′56.0″N 13°02′56.5″E | L Fl W 8s. | 41 metres (135 ft) | 9220 | E1576 | 8 |
| Rotonda della Madonna Lighthouse | Image | 1959 | Ponza; 40°53′42.92″N 12°58′13.17″E | Fl (4) W 15s. | 61 metres (200 ft) | 9228 | E1580 | 15 |
| Scoglio Ravia Lighthouse | Image | n/a | Ponza; 40°53′59.87″N 12°57′55.57″E | Fl G 3s. | 26 metres (85 ft) | 9240 | E1582 | 6 |
| Terracina entrata Canale lato Nord Lighthouse | Image | n/a | Terracina; 41°17′01.5″N 13°15′24.2″E | F G | 8 metres (26 ft) | 9260 | E1554 | 3 |
| Terracina entrata Canale lato Sud Lighthouse | Image | 1936 est. | Terracina; 41°17′00.4″N 13°15′24.3″E | F G | 8 metres (26 ft) | 9256 | E1552 | 3 |
| Terracina; Molo Gregoriano estremità Lighthouse | | 1948 est. | Terracina; 41°16′57.2″N 13°15′38.1″E | Fl R 5s. | 12 metres (39 ft) | 9248 | E1550 | 9 |
| Terracina; Molo Sopraflutto Lighthouse | Image | 1957 est. | Terracina; 41°17′01.4″N 13°15′31.9″E | Fl G 5s. | 8 metres (26 ft) | 9252 | E1551 | 7 |
| Ventotene Lighthouse | | 1891 | Ventotene; 40°47′48.74″N 13°26′04.65″E | Fl W 5s. | 21 metres (69 ft) | 9320 | E1592 | 15 |

== Liguria ==
This is a list of lighthouses in Liguria.

| Name | Image | Year built | Location & coordinates | Class of Light | Focal height | NGA number | Admiralty number | Range nml |
|---|---|---|---|---|---|---|---|---|
| Camogli; Foranea braccio Interno Lighthouse | Image | 1950 est. | Camogli; 44°21′05.2″N 9°09′02.1″E | Fl G 5s. | 6 metres (20 ft) | 7628 | E1238 | 3 |
| Camogli; Molo Interno Lighthouse | Image | 1950 est. | Camogli; 44°21′05.2″N 9°09′05.4″E | Fl R 5s. | 6 metres (20 ft) | 7632 | E1237 | 3 |
| Camogli Molo Esterno Lighthouse | | 1950 | Camogli; 44°21′06.42″N 9°08′57.09″E | Fl W 3s. | 11 metres (36 ft) | 7624 | E1236 | 9 |
| Capo dell'Arma Lighthouse | | 1948 | Bussana; 43°49′02.32″N 7°49′54.27″E | Fl (2) W 15s | 50 metres (160 ft) | 7316 | E1152 | 24 |
| Capo Mele Lighthouse | | 1856 | Andora; 43°57′19.14″N 8°10′20.16″E | Fl (3) W 15s. | 94 metres (308 ft) | 7356 | E1168 | 24 |
| Capo di Vado Lighthouse | | 1883 | Vado Ligure; 44°15′29.14″N 8°27′08.83″E | Fl (4) W 15s. | 43 metres (141 ft) | 7396 | E1172 | 16 |
| Genoa Lighthouse; La Lanterna | | 1543 | Genoa; 44°24′16.3″N 8°54′17.62″E | Fl (2) W 20s. | 117 metres (384 ft) | 7568 | E1206 | 25 |
| La Spezia; Darsena Duca degli Abruzzi Anteriore Lighthouse | Image | 1915 est. | La Spezia; 44°05′51.2″N 9°48′54.7″E | Fl WRG 3s. | 21 metres (69 ft) | 7744 | E1312 | white: 8 red: 6 green: 6 |
| La Spezia; Diga Foranea estremità Est Lighthouse | | n/a | La Spezia; 44°04′47.28″N 9°52′43.55″E | Fl (2) R 6s. | 10 metres (33 ft) | 7812 | E1270 | 8 |
| La Spezia; Diga Foranea estremità Ovest Lighthouse | Image | n/a | La Spezia; 44°04′08.01″N 9°51′21.5″E | Fl G 4s. | 11 metres (36 ft) | 7724 | E1269 | 9 |
| La Spezia; Molo Italia Lighthouse | | n/a | La Spezia; 44°06′15.35″N 9°50′02.27″E | Fl R 4s. | 8 metres (26 ft) | 7764 | E1290 | 8 |
| Marina Fiera Molo Est Lighthouse | Image | n/a | Genoa; 44°23′35.85″N 8°56′06.06″E | Fl G 4s. | 14 metres (46 ft) | 7584 | E1220 | 7 |
| Molo Duca di Galliera Lighthouse | Image | 1909 est. | Genoa; 44°23′19.42″N 8°56′16.99″E | Fl R 4s. | 18 metres (59 ft) | 7580 | E1219 | 15 |
| Molo Vecchio Lighthouse | Image | n/a | Genoa; 44°24′25.39″N 8°55′07.75″E | Fl G 3s. | 8 metres (26 ft) | 7604 | E1226 | 7 |
| Oneglia; Molo di Ponente Lighthouse | Image | 1881 est. | Oneglia; 43°53′06.5″N 8°02′28.11″E | Fl (2) R 7s. | 8 metres (26 ft) | 7344 | E1164 | 8 |
| Oneglia; Molo di Levante Lighthouse | Image | 1881 est. | Oneglia; 43°52′57.6″N 8°02′19.6″E | Fl (2) G 7s. | 10 metres (33 ft) | 7340 | E1162 | 8 |
| Oneglia; Molo di Sottoflutto Lighthouse | Image | 2015 | Oneglia; 43°53′02.77″N 8°02′20.47″E | Fl (2) R 6s. | 9 metres (30 ft) | n/a | E1163 | 8 |
| Pegazzano Lighthouse | Image | 1911 est. | La Spezia; 44°06′10.3″N 9°48′18.6″E | Iso W 4s. | 48 metres (157 ft) | 7748 | E1312.1 | 16 |
| Porto Maurizio Lighthouse | Image | 1881 est. | Porto Maurizio; 43°52′31.39″N 8°01′38.69″E | Iso W 4s. | 11 metres (36 ft) | 7320 | E1156 | 16 |
| Porto Maurizio; Molo di Levante Lighthouse | Image | n/a | Porto Maurizio; 43°52′31.39″N 8°01′38.69″E | Fl G 3s. | 8 metres (26 ft) | 7332 | E1158 | 8 |
| Porto Maurizio; Molo di Ponente Lighthouse | Image | 2009 | Porto Maurizio; 43°52′31.13″N 8°01′48.37″E | Fl R 3s. | 9 metres (30 ft) | 7328 | E1157 | 8 |
| Portofino Lighthouse | | 1917 | Portofino; 44°17′55.27″N 9°13′06.65″E | Fl W 5s. | 40 metres (130 ft) | 7636 | E1244 | 16 |
| Punta Santa Marinella Lighthouse | Image | 1913 | La Spezia; 44°04′01.0″N 9°51′04.0″E | Fl R 4s. | 11 metres (36 ft) | 7720 | E1268 | 9 |
| Punta Santa Teresa Lighthouse | | n/a | Lerici; 44°04′51.95″N 9°52′52.26″E | Fl (2) G 6s. | 10 metres (33 ft) | 7820 | E1274 | 8 |
| Punta Vagno Lighthouse | | 1931 | Genoa; 44°23′31.19″N 8°57′09.91″E | L Fl (3) W 15s. | 26 metres (85 ft) | 7612 | E1230 | 16 |
| San Venerio Lighthouse | | 1884 | Isola del Tino; 44°01′35.54″N 9°50′59.37″E | FI (3) W 15 s. | 117 metres (384 ft) | 7696 | E1262 | 25 |
| Sanremo estremità Molo Sud Lighthouse | Image | 1881 est | Sanremo; 43°48′54.71″N 7°47′13.34″E | L Fl R 5s. | 11 metres (36 ft) | 7292 | E1149 | 8 |
| Savona; Molo Miramare Lighthouse | Image | 1857 est. | Savona; 44°18′49.01″N 8°29′25.72″E | F G | 10 metres (33 ft) | 7496 | E1197 | 3 |
| Savona; Molo Nuovo Frangiflutti Lighthouse | Image | n/a | Savona; 44°18′53.38″N 8°30′18.05″E | Fl R 2s. | 12 metres (39 ft) | 7490 | E1193 | 8 |
| Savona; Molo Sottoflutto Lighthouse | Image | n/a | Savona; 44°19′00.15″N 8°29′44.22″E | Fl G 2s. | 9 metres (30 ft) | 7500 | E1196 | 7 |
| Scoglio Torre della Scuola Lighthouse | | 1920s or 1930s | Isola della Palmaria; 44°03′06.04″N 9°51′30.87″E | Fl (2) W 6s. | 16 metres (52 ft) | 7708 | E1263 | 10 |
| Vado Ligure; Molo Sopraflutto Lighthouse | Image | n/a | Vado Ligure; 44°16′03.15″N 8°27′13.7″E | Fl R 4s. | 10 metres (33 ft) | 7400 | E1172.8 | 8 |
| Voltri; Diga Foranea Lighthouse | Image | n/a | Voltri; 44°24′57.71″N 8°46′11.4″E | Iso WG 2s. | 16 metres (52 ft) | 7528 | E1202 | white: 11 green: 8 |

== The Marches ==
This is a list of lighthouses in the Marches.

| Name | Image | Year built | Location & coordinates | Class of Light | Focal height | NGA number | Admiralty number | Range nml |
|---|---|---|---|---|---|---|---|---|
| Ancona; Molo Foraneo Nord Lighthouse | | 1939 est. | Ancona; 43°37′31.83″N 13°29′38.1″E | Fl R 4s. | 11 metres (36 ft) | 11224 | E2346 | 8 |
| Ancona; Molo Foraneo Sud Lighthouse | Image | 1940 est. | Ancona; 43°37′20.83″N 13°29′42.85″E | Fl G 4s. | 11 metres (36 ft) | 11220 | E2349 | 7 |
| Ancona; Molo Nord estremità Est Lighthouse | Image | 1868 est. | Ancona; 43°37′25.6″N 13°30′00.1″E | Fl R 3s. | 8 metres (26 ft) | 11232 | E2348 | 8 |
| Ancona; Molo Nord sperone Ovest Lighthouse | Image | n/a | Ancona; 43°37′30.1″N 13°29′51.6″E | F R | 7 metres (23 ft) | 11228 | E2347 | 3 |
| Ancona; Scogliera Nord Lighthouse | Image | 2013 | Ancona; 43°37′41.4″N 13°29′26.3″E | Fl (2) G 6s. | 10 metres (33 ft) | 11226 | E2346.7 | 5 |
| Ancona; Scogliera Sud Lighthouse | Image | 2008 | Ancona; 43°37′15.2″N 13°29′05.6″E | Fl (2) R 6s. | 10 metres (33 ft) | 11225 | E2346.5 | 5 |
| Ancona; Molo Sud Lighthouse | Image | 1868 est. | Ancona; 43°37′21.6″N 13°29′51.9″E | Fl G 3s. | 11 metres (36 ft) | 11236 | E2350 | 8 |
| Civitanova Marche Lighthouse (Chiesa di Cristo Re) | | 1967 | Civitanova Marche; 43°18′38.5″N 13°43′40.9″E | Mo (C) W 20s. | 42 metres (138 ft) | 11208 | E2336.7 | 11 |
| Civitanova Marche; Molo Est Lighthouse | Image | 1971 | Civitanova Marche; 43°18′55.67″N 13°44′07.0″E | Fl R 5s. | 10 metres (33 ft) | 11200 | E2338 | 8 |
| Civitanova Marche; Molo Est sperone Lighthouse | Image | 1970 | Civitanova Marche; 43°18′46.5″N 13°44′01.0″E | Fl R 3s. | 7 metres (23 ft) | 11204 | E2338.2 | 4 |
| Civitanova Marche; Molo Nord estremità Lighthouse | Image | 1959 | Civitanova Marche; 43°18′51.12″N 13°43′58.9″E | Fl G 5s. | 9 metres (30 ft) | 11196 | E2339 | 8 |
| Ancona Lighthouse | | 1965 | Ancona, Monte Cappuccini; 43°37′22.2″N 13°30′56.7″E | Fl (4) W 30s. | 118 metres (387 ft) | 11216 | E2344 | 25 |
| Fano Lighthouse | Image | 1903 est. | Fano; 43°51′03.7″N 13°00′55.8″E | Fl W 5s. | 21 metres (69 ft) | 11280 | E2362 | 15 |
| Fano; Molo Est Lighthouse | Image | 1917 est. | Fano; 43°51′22.4″N 13°01′00.1″E | Fl R 3s. | 9 metres (30 ft) | 11284 | E2364 | 8 |
| Fano; Molo Ovest Lighthouse | Image | 1895 est. | Fano; 43°51′19.2″N 13°00′55.6″E | Fl G 3s. | 8 metres (26 ft) | 11288 | E2366 | 8 |
| Gabicce Mare Lighthouse | | 1960 | Gabicce; 43°58′08.3″N 12°45′04.1″E | Mo (O) W 14s. | 17 metres (56 ft) | 11308 | E2381 | 15 |
| Monte San Bartolo Lighthouse | | 1952 | Pesaro; 43°55′23.1″N 12°52′54.7″E | Fl (2) W 15s. | 175 metres (574 ft) | 11296 | E2372 | 25 |
| Pesaro; Nuovo Molo di Sopraflutto Lighthouse | Image | 1891 est. | Pesaro; 43°55′39.6″N 12°54′20.3″E | Fl R 5s. | 8 metres (26 ft) | 11300 | E2374 | 8 |
| Pesaro; Nuovo Molo di Sottoflutto Lighthouse | Image | 1901 est. | Pesaro; 43°55′35.6″N 12°54′16.9″E | Fl G 5s. | 8 metres (26 ft) | 11304 | E2376 | 8 |
| Pedaso Lighthouse | Image | 1950 | Pedaso; 43°05′28.3″N 13°50′42.5″E | Fl (3) W 15s. | 51 metres (167 ft) | 11188 | E2326 | 16 |
| San Benedetto del Tronto Lighthouse | | 1957 | San Benedetto del Tronto; 42°57′09.5″N 13°53′10.1″E | Fl (2) W 10s. | 31 metres (102 ft) | 11176 | E2332 | 22 |
| San Benedetto del Tronto Molo Nord Lighthouse | Image | 1910 est. | San Benedetto del Tronto; 42°57′26.45″N 13°53′26.15″E | Fl G 3s. | 8 metres (26 ft) | 11180 | E2333 | 8 |
| San Benedetto del Tronto Molo Sud Lighthouse | Image | 1922 est. | San Benedetto del Tronto; 42°57′35.86″N 13°53′40.28″E | Fl R 3s. | 8 metres (26 ft) | 11184 | E2334 | 8 |
| Senigallia; Diga di Levante Lighthouse | Image | 1950 | Senigallia; 43°43′11.8″N 13°13′15.1″E | L Fl (2) W 15s. | 17 metres (56 ft) | 11276 | E2358 | 15 |
| Senigallia; Diga di Levante estremità Lighthouse | Image | 1864 est. | Senigallia; 43°43′21.6″N 13°13′21.4″E | Fl Y 3s. | 9 metres (30 ft) | n/a | n/a | 8 |
| Senigallia; Molo di Sopraflutto Lighthouse | Image | 2008 | Senigallia; 43°43′26.1″N 13°13′16.9″E | Fl (2) R 6s. | 8 metres (26 ft) | 11268 | E2359 | 8 |
| Senigallia; Molo di Sottoflutto Lighthouse | Image | 2008 | Senigallia; 43°43′26.1″N 13°13′16.9″E | Fl (2) G 6s. | 9 metres (30 ft) | 11272 | E2360 | 8 |

== Molise ==
This is a list of lighthouses in Molise.

| Name | Image | Year built | Location & coordinates | Class of Light | Focal height | NGA number | Admiralty number | Range nml |
|---|---|---|---|---|---|---|---|---|
| Termoli Lighthouse | | 1963 | Termoli; 42°00′20.3″N 14°59′48.6″E | Fl (2) W 10s. inactive since September 2016 | 41 metres (135 ft) | 11080 | E2303 | 15 |
| Termoli; Molo Nord Lighthouse | Image | n/a | Termoli; 42°00′09.8″N 15°00′33.59″E | Fl G 3s. | 9 metres (30 ft) | 11084 | E2304 | 8 |
| Termoli; Molo Nord Vecchia Estremità Lighthouse | Image | 1935 est. | Termoli; 42°00′16.69″N 15°00′08.32″E | F G | 9 metres (30 ft) | 11088 | E2305 | 3 |
| Termoli; Molo Sud Lighthouse | Image | 1958 | Termoli; 42°00′10.43″N 15°00′13.28″E | Fl (2) Y 6s. | 9 metres (30 ft) | 11092 | E2306 | 8 |

== Sardinia ==
This is a list of lighthouses in Sardinia.

| Name | Image | Year built | Location & coordinates | Class of Light | Focal height | NGA number | Admiralty number | Range nml |
|---|---|---|---|---|---|---|---|---|
| Alghero; Molo Nuovo Sottoflutto Lighthouse | Image | 1992 | Alghero; 40°33′52.41″N 8°18′28.92″E | Fl R 3s. | 10 metres (33 ft) | 8288 | E1117.2 | 8 |
| Alghero; Molo Sud Lighthouse | Image | 1992 | Alghero; 40°33′56.52″N 8°18′19.53″E | Fl G 3s. | 10 metres (33 ft) | 8286 | E1117 | 8 |
| Alghero; Molo Nord Lighthouse | Image | 1910 est. | Alghero; 40°33′43.2″N 8°18′41.5″E | F R | 7 metres (23 ft) | 8296 | E1119 | 3 |
| Alghero; Moletto Nuova Darsena Lighthouse | Image | 1994 | Alghero; 40°33′46.7″N 8°18′50.0″E | F R | 5 metres (16 ft) | 8308 | E1116.4 | 4 |
| Alghero; Molo Furesi Lighthouse | Image | 1994 | Alghero; 40°33′46.4″N 8°18′50.9″E | F G | 5 metres (16 ft) | 8292 | E1118 | 5 |
| Barrettinelli di Fuori Lighthouse | | 1961 | Maddalena archipelago 41°18′05.8″N 9°24′03.1″E | Fl (2) W 10s. | 22 metres (72 ft) | 8192 | E0946 | 11 |
| Bosa Marina; Molo Commerciale Lighthouse | Image | 1956 | Bosa; 40°17′11.62″N 8°28′28.98″E | F R | 8 metres (26 ft) | n/a | n/a | 3 |
| Bosa Marina; Molo Sopraflutto Lighthouse | Image | 1992 | Bosa; 40°17′05.21″N 8°28′30.66″E | Fl R 3s. | 11 metres (36 ft) | n/a | n/a | 11 |
| Cagliari; Molo Capitaneria Lighthouse | Image | n/a | Cagliari; 39°12′38.9″N 9°06′48.6″E | Fl G 4s. | 6 metres (20 ft) | 8508 | E1064 | 3 |
| Cagliari; Molo Sant’Elmo Lighthouse | Image | 1972 | Cagliari; 39°12′05.1″N 9°07′26.1″E | Fl Y 5s. | 6 metres (20 ft) | 8524 | E1058 | 4 |
| Cagliari; Nuovo Molo di Levante Lighthouse | Image | 1856 est. | Cagliari; 39°11′43.9″N 9°06′34.4″E | Fl G 3s. | 13 metres (43 ft) | 8502 | E1057 | 9 |
| Cagliari; Nuovo Molo di Ponente Lighthouse | Image | 1991 | Cagliari; 39°12′09.9″N 9°06′35.9″E | F R | 7 metres (23 ft) | 8501 | E1056 | 4 |
| Cagliari; Pennello di Bonaria Lighthouse | Image | n/a | Cagliari; 39°12′17.0″N 9°07′13.4″E | Fl G 3s. | 6 metres (20 ft) | 8516 | E1059.2 | 3 |
| Cagliari; Pontile Dogana Lighthouse | Image | 1856 est. | Cagliari; 39°12′38.9″N 9°06′48.6″E | Fl R 4s. | 7 metres (23 ft) | 8512 | E1063 | 3 |
| Cala Gavetta Lighthouse | Image | 1936 est. | La Maddalena; 41°12′37.0″N 9°24′17.6″E | Fl R 3s. | 6 metres (20 ft) | | | 3 |
| Cala Gavetta; Molo di Sottoflutto Lighthouse | Image | 1951 est. | La Maddalena; 41°12′37.7″N 9°24′20.2″E | Fl G 3s. | 7 metres (23 ft) | | | 3 |
| Cala Stagnali; Range Front Lighthouse | Image | n/a | Caprera; 41°11′58.5″N 9°27′03.6″E | F G | 14 metres (46 ft) | 8816 | E0997 | 3 |
| Cala Stagnali; Range Rear Lighthouse | Image | n/a | Caprera; 41°11′56.4″N 9°27′06.1″E | F G | 14 metres (46 ft) | 8820 | E0997.1 | 3 |
| Capo Bellavista Lighthouse | Image | 1866 | Arbatax; 39°55′48.6″N 9°42′48.4″E | Fl (2) W 10s. | 165 metres (541 ft) | 8564 | E1032 | 26 |
| Capo Caccia Lighthouse | | 1846 | Alghero; 40°33′38.8″N 8°09′46.4″E | Fl W 5s. | 186 metres (610 ft) | 8276 | E1124 | 24 |
| Capo Carbonara Lighthouse | | 1974 | Villasimius; 39°06′12.8″N 9°30′50.2″E | Fl W 7.5s. | 120 metres (390 ft) | 8548 | E1043 | 23 |
| Capo Comino Lighthouse | | 1925 | Siniscola; 40°31′42.4″N 9°49′40.0″E | Fl W 5s. | 26 metres (85 ft) | 8588 | E1030 | 15 |
| Capo Ferrato Lighthouse | Image | 1925 | Castiadas; 39°17′57.6″N 9°38′00.4″E | Fl (3) W 10s. | 51 metres (167 ft) | 8560 | E1042 | 11 |
| Capo Ferro Lighthouse | | 1861 | Capo Ferro; 41°09′17.7″N 9°31′23.7″E | Fl (3) W 15s. | 52 metres (171 ft) | 8724 | E1002 | 24 |
| Capo Ferro; Nord Est Estremità Lighthouse | | 1935 | Capo Ferro; 41°09′24.0″N 9°31′34.9″E | Fl R 3s. | 14 metres (46 ft) | 8728 | E1003 | 8 |
| Capo Frasca Lighthouse | Image | 1926 est. | Arbus; 39°46′07.7″N 8°27′20.6″E | Fl W 10s. | 66 metres (217 ft) | 8356 | E1104 | 11 |
| Capo Mannu Lighthouse | Image | 1960 | Capo Mannu; 40°02′06.3″N 8°22′40.7″E | Fl (3) W 15s. | 59 metres (194 ft) | 8312 | E1112 | 15 |
| Capo d'Orso Lighthouse | | 1960 | Palau; 41°10′39.5″N 9°25′23.4″E | Fl W 3s. | 12 metres (39 ft) | 8748 | E0992 | 10 |
| Capo di Pula Lighthouse | Image | n/a | Domus de Maria; 38°59′03.1″N 9°01′12.6″E | Fl (4) W 15s. | 48 metres (157 ft) | 8452 | E1070 | 11 |
| Capo San Marco Lighthouse | | 1924 | Cabras; 39°51′36.3″N 8°26′03.5″E | Fl (2) W 10s. | 57 metres (187 ft) | 8320 | E1108 | 22 |
| Capo Sandalo Lighthouse | | 1864 | Isola di San Pietro; 39°08′50.8″N 8°13′25.4″E | Fl (4) W 20s. | 134 metres (440 ft) | 8432 | E1090 | 24 |
| Capo Sant'Elia Lighthouse | | 1860 | Cagliari; 39°11′03.4″N 9°08′50.5″E | Fl (2) W 10s. | 70 metres (230 ft) | 8532 | E1054 | 21 |
| Capo Spartivento Lighthouse | | 1866 | Domus de Maria; 38°52′40.1″N 8°50′43.8″E | Fl (3) W 15s. | 81 metres (266 ft) | 8448 | E1072 | 22 |
| Capo Testa Lighthouse | | 1845 | Santa Teresa Gallura; 41°14′37.57″N 9°08′39.18″E | Fl (3) W 12s. | 67 metres (220 ft) | 8208 | E0938 | 22 |
| Carloforte; Campanile Duomo Lighthouse | Image | 1959 | Carloforte; 39°08′44.0″N 8°18′20.0″E | F R | 23 metres (75 ft) | 8388 | E1093 | 3 |
| Carloforte; Casa Fanalisti Lighthouse | Image | 1955 | Carloforte; 39°08′24.9″N 8°18′35.7″E | F R | 11 metres (36 ft) | 8412 | E1094 | 6 |
| Carloforte; Molo Centrale Lighthouse | Image | 1905 est. | Carloforte; 39°08′42.4″N 8°18′31.6″E | Fl Y 3s. | 9 metres (30 ft) | 8400 | E1095 | 3 |
| Golfo Aranci; Banchina Commerciale Lighthouse | Image | n/a | Golfo Aranci; 40°59′40.9″N 9°37′17.5″E | Oc R 3s. | 8 metres (26 ft) | n/a | n/a | 3 |
| Golfo Aranci; Darsena Pescherecci Sinistra Lighthouse | Image | n/a | Golfo Aranci; 40°59′46.1″N 9°37′19.6″E | F R | 6 metres (20 ft) | n/a | n/a | 4 |
| Golfo Aranci; Darsena Pescherecci Destra Lighthouse | Image | n/a | Golfo Aranci; 40°59′45.9″N 9°37′17.8″E | F G | 6 metres (20 ft) | n/a | n/a | 4 |
| Golfo Aranci; Molo Comune Lighthouse | Image | n/a | Golfo Aranci; 40°59′38.1″N 9°37′19.6″E | Oc Y 3s. | 3 metres (9.8 ft) | n/a | n/a | 3 |
| Golfo Aranci; Molo a Dritta Lighthouse | Image | 1985 | Golfo Aranci; 40°59′35.3″N 9°37′20.5″E | Oc G 3s. | 6 metres (20 ft) | n/a | n/a | 3 |
| Isola delle Bisce Lighthouse | | 1935 est. | Arzachena; 41°09′42.9″N 9°31′28.9″E | Fl G 3s. | 11 metres (36 ft) | 8732 | E1000 | 8 |
| Isola della Bocca Lighthouse | | 1887 | Olbia; 40°55′13.9″N 9°34′00.7″E | L Fl W 5s. (temporary inactive as March 2018) | 24 metres (79 ft) | 8616 | E1014 | 15 |
| Isola dei Cavoli Lighthouse | | 1858 | Villasimius; 39°05′19.1″N 9°32′00.1″E | Fl (2) WR 10s. | 74 metres (243 ft) | 8552 | E1048 | 11 |
| Isola Chiesa Diga Lighthouse | Image | 1890est. | La Maddalena; 41°12′36.2″N 9°25′02.3″E | F R | 8 metres (26 ft) | 8756 | E0966 | 3 |
| Isola di Mezzo Estremità Sud Lighthouse | Image | 1956 | Olbia; 40°55′12.7″N 9°30′41.4″E | Fl G 3s. | 7 metres (23 ft) | 8624 | E1019 | 4 |
| Isola Piana Lighthouse | Image | 1972 | Portovesme; 39°11′37.9″N 8°19′10.3″E | Fl (2) WR 8s. | 18 metres (59 ft) | 8360 | E1103 | 7 |
| Isola del Toro Lighthouse | Image | 1925 est. | Sant'Antioco; 38°51′39.9″N 8°24′32.8″E | Fl (2) WR 6s. | 118 metres (387 ft) | 8436 | E1074 | 11 |
| Isola Razzoli Lighthouse | | 1974 | Maddalena archipelago 41°18′25.8″N 9°20′23.8″E | Fl WR 2.5s. | 77 metres (253 ft) | 8691 | E0940 | 19 |
| Isolotto Figarolo Lighthouse | Image | 1915 est. | Golfo Aranci; 40°58′44.0″N 9°38′40.3″E | Fl W 5s. | 71 metres (233 ft) | 8664 | E1010 | 11 |
| Isolotto della Maddalena Lighthouse | | 1940 | Alghero; 40°34′20.3″N 8°18′01.4″E | Fl R 5s. | 10 metres (33 ft) | 8284 | E1122 | 4 |
| Isolotto Mal di Ventre Lighthouse | Image | n/a | Cabras; 39°59′34.5″N 8°18′14.2″E | Fl WR 6s. | 26 metres (85 ft) | 8316 | E1111 | 11 |
| Isolotto Monaci Lighthouse | | 1936 est. | Maddalena archipelago 41°12′57.7″N 9°31′00.7″E | Fl WR 5s. | 24 metres (79 ft) | 8736 | E0998 | 11 |
| Olbia; Pontile Brin Lighthouse | Image | n/a | Olbia; 40°55′18.7″N 9°30′33.6″E | F G | 6 metres (20 ft) | 8632 | E1020 | 3 |
| Oristano; Molo Sopraflutto Lighthouse | Image | 1978 | Oristano; 39°51′55.4″N 8°32′14.4″E | Fl G 5s. | 12 metres (39 ft) | n/a | n/a | 8 |
| Oristano; Molo Sottoflutto Lighthouse | Image | 2004 | Oristano; 39°51′55.4″N 8°32′35.2″E | Fl R 5s. | 10 metres (33 ft) | n/a | n/a | 7 |
| Palau Molo Lighthouse | Image | 1932 est. | Palau; 41°10′56.2″N 9°23′10.7″E | Fl Y 3s. | 6 metres (20 ft) | 8833 | E0990 | 3 |
| Porto Conte Lighthouse | | 1918 est. | Alghero; 40°35′37.64″N 8°12′14.73″E | Fl W 3s. | 17 metres (56 ft) | 8280 | E1126 | 10 |
| Porto Ponte Romano Lighthouse | Image | 1924 est. | Sant'Antioco; 39°03′29.6″N 8°28′25.9″E | Fl W 5s. | 23 metres (75 ft) | 8440 | E1315 | 15 |
| Porto Torres Lighthouse | | 1966 | Porto Torres; 40°50′09.86″N 8°23′50.25″E | L Fl (2) W 10s. | 45 metres (148 ft) | 8216 | E1138 | 16 |
| Porto Torres; Molo di Levante Lighthouse | Image | 1956 | Porto Torres; 40°50′41.8″N 8°23′56.44″E | L Fl R 6s. | 11 metres (36 ft) | 8220 | E1140 | 8 |
| Porto Torres; Molo di Ponente Lighthouse | Image | 1969 | Porto Torres; 40°50′53.46″N 8°23′57.55″E | L Fl G 6s. | 11 metres (36 ft) | 8224 | E1139 | 11 |
| Portovesme; Diga di Levante Lighthouse | Image | 1972 | Portovesme; 39°11′33.4″N 8°23′30.6″E | Fl G 3s. | 11 metres (36 ft) | 8380 | E1101 | 7 |
| Portovesme; Molo di Ponente Lighthouse | Image | n/a | Portovesme; 39°11′35.8″N 8°23′12.2″E | Fl R 3s. | 11 metres (36 ft) | 8374 | E1100.5 | 7 |
| Punta Filetto Lighthouse | | 1913 | Maddalena archipelago 41°17′55.13″N 9°23′02.62″E | Fl (4) W 20s. | 17 metres (56 ft) | 8188 | E0942 | 10 |
| Punta Palau Lighthouse | | 1935 est. | Palau; 41°11′15.1″N 9°22′52.0″E | Fl (2) G 10s. | 15 metres (49 ft) | 8832 | E0988 | 4 |
| Punta Sardegna Lighthouse | | 1913 | Punta Sardegna; 41°12′24.7″N 9°21′46.6″E | Fl W 5s. | 38 metres (125 ft) | 8836 | E0950 | 11 |
| Punta Scorno Lighthouse | Image | 1859 | Asinara; 41°07′10.4″N 8°19′06.88″E | Fl (4) W 20s. | 80 metres (260 ft) | 8212 | E1130 | 16 |
| Punta Timone Lighthouse | Image | 1922 | Tavolara; 40°55′34.1″N 9°44′09.3″E | L Fl (2) W 10s. | 72 metres (236 ft) | 8600 | E1028 | 15 |
| Punta Villamarina Lighthouse | Image | 1954 | Isola Santo Stefano; 41°11′11.5″N 9°24′35.5″E | Fl G 4s. | 14 metres (46 ft) | 8752 | E0991 | 4 |
| Rada della Reale Lighthouse | Image | 1912 est. | Asinara; 41°03′11.1″N 8°17′37.39″E | Fl WR 5s. | 11 metres (36 ft) | 8268 | E1132 | 7 |
| Scoglio La Ghinghetta Lighthouse | Image | 1914 est. | Portoscuso; 39°11′59.0″N 8°22′09.4″E | Fl (2) WR 10s. | 12 metres (39 ft) | 8364 | E1099 | 11 |
| Scoglio Mangiabarche Lighthouse | | 1935 | Sant'Antioco; 39°04′35.4″N 8°20′43.6″E | Fl W 6s. | 12 metres (39 ft) | 8428 | E1086 | 11 |
| Secca dei Berni Lighthouse | Image | 1902 est. | Villasimius; 39°06′46.0″N 9°32′57.0″E | Fl (2) W 6s. | 9 metres (30 ft) | 8556 | E1044 | 4 |
| Torre Grande Lighthouse | | 1919 est. | Marina di Torre Grande; 39°54′23.9″N 8°30′58.4″E | Fl R 5s. | 18 metres (59 ft) | 8324 | E1106 | 8 |

== Sicily ==
This is a list of lighthouses in Sicily.

| Name | Image | Year built | Location & coordinates | Class of Light | Focal height | NGA number | Admiralty number | Range nml |
|---|---|---|---|---|---|---|---|---|
| Augusta; Diga Centrale Lighthouse | Image | 1937 est. | Augusta; 37°10′30.8″N 15°12′50.4″E | Fl (2) R 10s. | 14 metres (46 ft) | 10324 | E1848 | 8 |
| Augusta; Diga Settentrionale Lighthouse | Image | n/a | Augusta; 37°10′37.6″N 15°12′59.4″E | Fl (2) G 10s. | 12 metres (39 ft) | 10320 | E1847 | 8 |
| Augusta; Dromo Giggia Lighthouse | Image | 1939 | Augusta; 37°12′03.4″N 15°09′09.3″E | Oc W 5s. | 79 metres (259 ft) | 10332 | E1846.1 | 17 |
| Augusta; Terravecchia Lighthouse | Image | 1933 est. | Augusta; 37°12′57.7″N 15°13′21.5″E | F R | 8 metres (26 ft) | 10336 | E1849 | 3 |
| Brucoli Lighthouse | Image | 1912 | Brucoli; 37°17′09.0″N 15°11′10.7″E | Fl W 5s. | 13 metres (43 ft) | 10396 | E1836 | 11 |
| Capo Cefalù Lighthouse | | 1900 | Cefalù; 38°02′23.3″N 14°01′46.2″E | Fl W 5s. | 80 metres (260 ft) | 9860 | E2036 | 25 |
| Capo d'Orlando Lighthouse | | 1904 | Capo d'Orlando; 38°09′53.1″N 14°44′48.7″E | L Fl (2) W 12s. | 16 metres (52 ft) | 9856 | E2038 | 16 |
| Capo Faro Lighthouse | Image | 1884 est. | Salina; 38°34′50.2″N 14°52′17.6″E | L Fl W 6s. | 56 metres (184 ft) | 9848 | E1798 | 18 |
| Capo Feto Lighthouse | Image | 1990 | Mazara del Vallo; 37°39′39.4″N 12°31′14.3″E | L Fl W 10s. | 14 metres (46 ft) | 10076 | E1938 | 11 |
| Capo Gallo Lighthouse | | 1854 | Capo Gallo; 38°13′24.6″N 13°19′00.1″E | L Fl (2) W 15s. | 40 metres (130 ft) | 9936 | E2004 | 16 |
| Capo Granitola Lighthouse | | 1865 | Campobello di Mazara; 37°33′57.5″N 12°39′43.5″E | L Fl W 10s. | 37 metres (121 ft) | 10092 | E1930 | 18 |
| Capo Grecale Lighthouse | | 1855 | Lampedusa; 35°31′03.5″N 12°37′55.6″E | Fl W 5s. | 82 metres (269 ft) | 10444 | E2088 | 22 |
| Capo Grosso Lighthouse | | 1858 | Levanzo; 38°01′13.3″N 12°20′03.0″E | Fl (3) W 15s. | 68 metres (223 ft) | 10004 | E1962 | 11 |
| Capo Milazzo Lighthouse | | 1891 | Capo di Milazzo; 38°16′13.7″N 15°13′51.4″E | L Fl W 6s. | 90 metres (300 ft) | 9796 | E2042 | 16 |
| Capo Molini Lighthouse | Image | 1919 | Acireale; 37°34′36.8″N 15°10′34.2″E | Fl (3) W 15s. | 42 metres (138 ft) | 10432 | E1826 | 22 |
| Capo Murro di Porco Lighthouse | | 1959 | Siracusa; 37°00′11.3″N 15°20′06.2″E | Fl W 5s. | 34 metres (112 ft) | 10240 | E1876 | 17 |
| Capo Passero Lighthouse | | 1871 | Capo Passero; 36°41′18.4″N 15°09′06.1″E | Fl (2) W 10s. | 39 metres (128 ft) | 10228 | E1884 | 11 |
| Capo Peloro Lighthouse | | 1884 | Punta del Faro; 38°16′05.6″N 15°39′02.5″E | Fl (2) W 10s. | 37 metres (121 ft) | 9784 | E1806 | 19 |
| Capo Ponente Lighthouse | Image | n/a | Lampedusa; 35°31′12.9″N 12°31′06.4″E | Fl (3) W 15s. | 110 metres (360 ft) | 10464 | E2086 | 8 |
| Capo Rasocolmo Lighthouse | Image | n/a | Messina; 38°17′44.6″N 15°31′08.4″E | Fl (3) W 10s. | 85 metres (279 ft) | 9792 | E2046 | 15 |
| Capo Rossello Lighthouse | Image | 1859 est. | Realmonte; 37°17′41.7″N 13°27′00.3″E | Fl W 10s. | 89 metres (292 ft) | 10112 | E1922 | 22 |
| Capo San Marco Lighthouse | Image | 1992 | Sciacca; 37°29′45.3″N 13°01′15.4″E | Fl (3) W 15s. | 25 metres (82 ft) | 10094 | E1928.5 | 18 |
| Capo Santa Croce Lighthouse | | 1859 | Augusta; 37°14′36.3″N 15°15′22.8″E | L Fl (2) W 12s. | 39 metres (128 ft) | 10392 | E1838 | 16 |
| Capo Scaramia Lighthouse | | 1859 est. | Punta Secca; 36°47′14.4″N 14°29′38.5″E | Fl (2) W 8s. | 37 metres (121 ft) | 10184 | E1896 | 16 |
| Capo Zafferano Lighthouse | | 1884 | Santa Flavia; 38°06′43.7″N 13°32′15.1″E | Fl (3) WR 10s. | 34 metres (112 ft) | 9900 | E2023 | 16 |
| Castello Maniace Lighthouse | Image | 1858 est. | Siracusa; 37°03′11.3″N 15°17′42.9″E | Fl G 3s. | 27 metres (89 ft) | 10248 | E1866 | 9 |
| Castello Normanno Lighthouse | | 1901 | Castellammare del Golfo; 38°02′01.2″N 12°53′05.4″E | Fl (2) W 10s. | 19 metres (62 ft) | 9968 | E1992 | 10 |
| Catania; Molo di Levante Lighthouse | | 1941 est. | Catania; 37°29′12.8″N 15°05′55.8″E | L Fl G 5s. | 12 metres (39 ft) | 10420 | E1830 | 8 |
| Catania; Molo di Levante Banchina Lighthouse | Image | 1932 est. | Catania; 37°29′29.8″N 15°05′55.″E | Fl G 2s. | 11 metres (36 ft) | 10424 | E1831 | 5 |
| Catania; Scogliera Estremità Lighthouse | Image | | Catania; 37°29′16″N 15°05′43.6″E | L Fl R 5s. | | | E1832.5 | |
| Cozzo Spadaro Lighthouse | | 1864 | Portopalo di Capo Passero; 36°41′10.7″N 15°07′53.9″E | Fl (3) W 15s. | 82 metres (269 ft) | 10224 | E1882 | 24 |
| Favignana; Molo Foraneo Lighthouse | Image | 1969 | Favignana; 37°56′02.0″N 12°19′28.1″E | Fl R 4s. | 7 metres (23 ft) | 10024 | E1949 | 7 |
| Gela; Molo di Levante Lighthouse | Image | n/a | Gela; 37°03′46.6″N 14°13′47.6″E | Fl G 3s. | 8 metres (26 ft) | 10152 | E1902 | 8 |
| Gela; Molo di Ponente Lighthouse | Image | 1964 | Gela; 37°03′50.1″N 14°13′44.8″E | Fl R 3s. | 8 metres (26 ft) | 10156 | E1902.2 | 8 |
| Isola delle Correnti Lighthouse | | 1865 | Portopalo di Capo Passero; 36°38′42.8″N 15°04′38.7″E | Fl W 4s. inactive | 16 metres (52 ft) | 10212 | E1886 | 11 |
| Isolotto Asinelli Lighthouse | Image | 1912 est. | Pizzolungo; 38°03′51.8″N 12°31′46.0″E | Fl (2) W 6s. | 13 metres (43 ft) | 10040 | E1982 | 10 |
| Isolotto Formica Lighthouse | | 1858 | Aegadian Islands; 37°59′21.1″N 12°25′32.1″E | Fl W 4s. | 28 metres (92 ft) | 10032 | E1966 | 11 |
| Lampione Lighthouse | | 1935 | Pelagian Islands; 35°33′05.9″N 12°19′54.1″E | Fl (2) W 10s. | 40 metres (130 ft) | 10476 | E3064 | 7 |
| Licata; Diga Antemurale estremità Lighthouse | | n/a | Licata; 37°05′05.1″N 13°56′23.2″E | Fl R 5s. | 11 metres (36 ft) | 10137 | E1907 | 8 |
| Licata; Diga Antemurale interno Lighthouse | Image | n/a | Licata; 37°05′19.2″N 13°56′18.4″E | Fl R 5s. | 11 metres (36 ft) | 10136 | E1906 | 4 |
| Licata; Diga di Levante Lighthouse | Image | n/a | Licata; 37°05′05.6″N 13°56′34.9″E | Fl G 5s. | 10 metres (33 ft) | 10132 | E1908 | 8 |
| Licata; Molo di Levante Lighthouse | Image | n/a | Licata; 37°05′29.5″N 13°56′16.8″E | Fl G 3s. | 12 metres (39 ft) | 10144 | E1905 | 4 |
| Licata; Molo di Ponente Lighthouse | Image | n/a | Licata; 37°05′33.2″N 13°56′06.5″E | Fl R 3s. | 12 metres (39 ft) | 10140 | E1912 | 4 |
| Lipari; Marina Corta Lighthouse | | 2014 | Lipari; 38°27′53.2″N 14°57′27.7″E | Fl (3) W 15s. | 10 metres (33 ft) | 9836 | E1792 | 14 |
| Lipari; Molo Pignataro Lighthouse | Image | 1928 est. | Lipari; 38°28′36.7″N 14°57′46.8″E | Fl G 3s. | 11 metres (36 ft) | 9828 | E1788 | 7 |
| Marettimo; Molo Nord Lighthouse | Image | n/a | Marettimo; 37°58′12.8″N 12°04′21.9″E | Fl R 3s. | 8 metres (26 ft) | 10012 | E1958 | 5 |
| Marina di Ragusa Lighthouse | Image | 1912 | Marina di Ragusa; 36°46′57.3″N 14°33′07.6″E | Fl W 5s. | 12 metres (39 ft) | 10188 | E1894 | 8 |
| Marsala; Diga Foranea Lighthouse | Image | n/a | Marsala; 37°47′00.5″N 12°26′06.1″E | Fl R 3s. | 11 metres (36 ft) | 10068 | E1942 | 8 |
| Marsala; Molo di Levante Lighthouse | Image | n/a | Marsala; 37°47′12.8″N 12°26′21.7″E | Fl G 3s. | 9 metres (30 ft) | 10072 | E1944 | 8 |
| Marsala; Molo di Ponente Lighthouse | Image | 1885 | Marsala; 37°47′14.9″N 12°26′12.3″E | Fl (2) W 10s. | 19 metres (62 ft) | 10064 | E1940 | 15 |
| Messina; Capitaneria di Porto Lighthouse | Image | n/a | Messina; 38°11′48.7″N 15°33′29.1″E | Fl (2) G 5s. | 16 metres (52 ft) | 9780 | E1818 | 8 |
| Milazzo; Molo Eolie Lighthouse | Image | 1966 | Milazzo; 38°13′01.4″N 15°14′31.4″E | Fl Y 3s. | 7 metres (23 ft) | 9804 | E2045.4 | 3 |
| Milazzo; Molo Foraneo Lighthouse | Image | 1891 est. | Milazzo; 38°12′57.6″N 15°14′58.8″E | L Fl G 5s. | 12 metres (39 ft) | 9800 | E2044 | 7 |
| Milazzo; Molo Sottoflutto Lighthouse | Image | n/a | Milazzo; 38°12′51.8″N 15°14′48.2″E | L Fl R 5s. | 12 metres (39 ft) | 9808 | E2044.2 | 6 |
| Palermo Lighthouse | Image | 1853 est. | Palermo; 38°07′57.5″N 13°22′12.7″E | inactive | 18 metres (59 ft) (tower) | n/a | ex-E2008 | n/a |
| Palermo; Diga Foranea gomito Lighthouse | Image | 1982 | Palermo; 38°07′35.2″N 13°22′30.7″E | Fl (4) W 15s. | 15 metres (49 ft) | 9908 | E2008 | 15 |
| Palermo; Diga Foranea estremità Lighthouse | Image | n/a | Palermo; 38°07′20.5″N 13°22′49.1″E | L Fl G 5s. | 10 metres (33 ft) | 9910 | E2013 | 5 |
| Palermo; Molo Bersagliere Lighthouse | Image | 1870 est. | Palermo; 38°07′33.2″N 13°22′18.3″E | L Fl R 5s. | 9 metres (30 ft) | 9912 | E2014 | 8 |
| Pantelleria; Diga Foranea Lighthouse | Image | 2010 | Pantelleria; 36°50′15.8″N 11°56′24.9″E | Fl G 4s. | 8 metres (26 ft) | n/a | n/a | 5 |
| Pantelleria; Molo Cidonio Lighthouse | Image | n/a | Pantelleria; 36°50′01.2″N 11°56′15.7″E | F G | 7 metres (23 ft) | n/a | n/a | 3 |
| Pantelleria; Molo Karol Wojtyla Lighthouse | Image | n/a | Pantelleria; 36°50′05.2″N 11°56′27.0″E | Fl Y 2s. | 8 metres (26 ft) | n/a | n/a | 3 |
| Penisola Magnisi Lighthouse | Image | 1859 est. | Augusta; 37°09′29.8″N 15°14′02.9″E | Fl (4) W 12s. | 10 metres (33 ft) | 10308 | E1860 | 11 |
| Porto Empedocle; Molo di Levante Lighthouse | Image | n/a | Porto Empedocle; 37°16′48.3″N 13°31′40.9″E | Fl G 3s. | 9 metres (30 ft) | 10116 | E1918 | 8 |
| Porto Empedocle; Molo di Ponente Lighthouse | Image | 1955 | Porto Empedocle; 37°16′29.6″N 13°31′39.0″E | Fl R 3s. | 12 metres (39 ft) | 10120 | E1920 | 8 |
| Porto Empedocle; Molo Crispi Lighthouse | Image | n/a | Porto Empedocle; 37°17′05.5″N 13°31′47.6″E | (2) F R | 6 metres (20 ft) | 10124 | E1920 | 3 |
| Pozzallo; Diga Foranea Lighthouse | Image | n/a | Pozzallo; 36°42′34.5″N 14°49′52.7″E | Fl (4) W 12s. | 18 metres (59 ft) | 10196 | E1889.05 | 15 |
| Pozzallo; Diga Foranea estremità Lighthouse | Image | n/a | Pozzallo; 36°42′33.3″N 14°50′26.8″E | Fl R 3s. | 11 metres (36 ft) | n/a | n/a | 5 |
| Pozzallo; Molo Sottoflutto Lighthouse | Image | n/a | Pozzallo; 36°42′45.6″N 14°49′56.9″E | Fl G 3s. | 8 metres (26 ft) | n/a | n/a | 5 |
| Punta Arena Bianca Lighthouse | Image | n/a | Linosa; 35°51′23.5″N 12°51′31.2″E | Fl W 5s. | 9 metres (30 ft) | 10472 | E2080 | 9 |
| Punta Beppe Tuccio Lighthouse | | 1891 | Linosa; 35°52′19.9″N 12°52′43.0″E | Fl (4) 20s. | 32 metres (105 ft) | 10468 | E2082 | 16 |
| Punta Castelluccio Lighthouse | Image | 1864 | Siracusa; 37°02′33.3″N 15°18′09.1″E | Fl R 3s. | 21 metres (69 ft) | 10244 | E1867 | 9 |
| Punta Gavazzi Lighthouse | Image | 1885 | Ustica; 38°41′39.0″N 13°09′17.6″E | Fl (4) W 12s. | 40 metres (130 ft) | 9964 | E2000 | 16 |
| Punta Gennalena Lighthouse | Image | 1939 | Augusta; 37°11′57.4″N 15°11′02.5″E | Iso W 4s. | 16 metres (52 ft) | 10328 | E1846 | 12 |
| Punta Libeccio Lighthouse | Image | 1867 | Marettimo; 37°57′24.2″N 12°03′00.3″E | Fl (2) W 15s. | 73 metres (240 ft) | 10004 | E1956 | 24 |
| Punta Limarsi Lighthouse | Image | 1941 est. | Pantelleria; 36°44′19.4″N 12°01′57.8″E | Fl (3) W 15s. | 35 metres (115 ft) | 10492 | E2106 | 7 |
| Punta Lingua Lighthouse | | 1953 | Salina; 38°32′13.9″N 14°52′16.4″E | Fl W 3s. | 13 metres (43 ft) | 9852 | E1796 | 11 |
| Punta Marsala Lighthouse | Image | 1859 est. | Favignana; 37°54′24.3″N 12°21′55.3″E | Fl (4) W 15s. | 20 metres (66 ft) | 10016 | E1948 | 15 |
| Punta Omo Morto Lighthouse | Image | 1884 | Ustica; 38°42′45.2″N 13°11′54.9″E | Fl (3) W 15s. | 100 metres (330 ft) | 9956 | E1996 | 25 |
| Punta Peppemaria Lighthouse | Image | 1937 est. | Panarea; 38°38′12.3″N 15°04′41.8″E | Fl WR 5s. | 15 metres (49 ft) | 9840 | E1800 | 10 |
| Punta dei Porci Lighthouse | | 1887 | Vulcano; 38°22′01.8″N 14°59′29.8″E | Fl (4) W 20s. | 35 metres (115 ft) | 9824 | E1786 | 16 |
| Punta San Leonardo Lighthouse | Image | 1988 | Pantelleria; 36°50′07.1″N 11°56′40.2″E | Fl W 3s. | 21 metres (69 ft) | 10500 | E2098 | 15 |
| Punta San Leonardo Estremità Lighthouse | Image | n/a | Pantelleria; 36°50′10.1″N 11°56′38.0″E | Fl Y 2s. | 8 metres (26 ft) | n/a | n/a | 5 |
| Punta San Ranieri Lighthouse | Imge | 1555 | Messina; 38°11′36.7″N 15°34′28.0″E | Fl (3) W 15s. | 41 metres (135 ft) | 9768 | E1814 | 22 |
| Punta San Salvatore Lighthouse | Image | n/a | Messina; 38°11′47.6″N 15°33′45.7″E | Fl (2) R 5s. | 16 metres (52 ft) | 9776 | E1817 | 8 |
| Punta Secca Lighthouse | Image | 1888 est. | Messina; 38°11′49.8″N 15°34′21.5″E | Oc Y 3s. | 13 metres (43 ft) | 9772 | E1816 | 10 |
| Punta Solanto Lighthouse | Image | 1937 | San Vito Lo Capo; 38°10′30.4″N 12°46′14.6″E | Fl WR 3s. | 25 metres (82 ft) | 9984 | E1990 | 10 |
| Punta Sottile Lighthouse | | 1904 | Favignana; 37°56′06.2″N 12°16′20.4″E | FL W 8s. | 43 metres (141 ft) | 10020 | E1952 | 25 |
| Punta Tracino Lighthouse | Image | 1942 est. | Pantelleria; 36°47′53.3″N 12°02′58.1″E | Fl (2) W 10s. | 49 metres (161 ft) | 10484 | E2107 | 10 |
| Riposto; Molo Sopraflutto Lighthouse | Image | 1989 | Riposto; 37°43′43.2″N 15°12′39.6″E | L Fl W 5s. | 15 metres (49 ft) | 10436 | E1822 | 11 |
| Riposto; Molo Sopraflutto Estremità Lighthouse | | n/a | Riposto; 37°44′06.0″N 15°12′36.3″E | Fl R 3s. | 5 metres (16 ft) | 10440 | E1823 | 11 |
| Riposto; Molo Sottoflutto Lighthouse | | n/a | Riposto; 37°44′01.8″N 15°12′32.6″E | Fl G 3s. | 6 metres (20 ft) | 10442 | E1824 | 4 |
| San Giacomo Lighthouse | | 1895 | Licata; 37°05′46.7″N 13°56′27.5″E | Fl W 5s. | 40 metres (130 ft) | 10128 | E1904 | 21 |
| San Vito Lo Capo Lighthouse | | 1859 est. | San Vito Lo Capo; 38°11′18.4″N 12°44′00.3″E | Fl W 5s. | 45 metres (148 ft) | 9988 | E1986 | 25 |
| Scauri Lighthouse | Image | 1942 est. | Pantelleria; 36°46′05.9″N 11°57′39.8″E | Fl W 5s. | 18 metres (59 ft) | 10496 | E2096 | 10 |
| Sciacca; Molo di Levante interno Lighthouse | Image | 1963 | Sciacca; 37°30′08.1″N 13°04′43.4″E | Fl G 4s. | n/a | 10100 | E1926.2 | 2 |
| Sciacca; Molo di Levante esterno Lighthouse | Image | n/a | Sciacca; 37°30′02.7″N 13°04′32.6″E | L Fl G 6s. | 11 metres (36 ft) | 1018 | E1928 | 8 |
| Sciacca; Molo di Ponente Lighthouse | Image | n/a | Sciacca; 37°30′09.1″N 13°04′35.8″E | L Fl R 6s. | 9 metres (30 ft) | 10104 | E1927 | 8 |
| Sciacca; Molo di Levante gomito Lighthouse | Image | n/a | Sciacca; 37°30′13.2″N 13°04′48.3″E | Fl G 5s. | n/a | 10096 | E1925 | 2 |
| Sciara Biscari Lighthouse | | 1951 | Catania; 37°29′20.4″N 15°05′06.7″E | Fl W 5s. | 31 metres (102 ft) | 10400 | E1828 | 22 |
| Scogli Porcelli Lighthouse | | 1904 | Trapani; 38°02′38.0″N 12°26′22.0″E | Fl (2) W 10s. | 23 metres (75 ft) | 10036 | E1968 | 11 |
| Scogli i Porri Lighthouse | Image | n/a | Pozzallo; 36°41′10.4″N 14°55′54.5″E | Fl (2) W 6s. | 7 metres (23 ft) | 10208 | E1888 | 7 |
| Scoglio Montenassari Lighthouse | | n/a | Filicudi; 38°34′56.0″N 14°31′37.5″E | Fl (5) W 15s. | 2 metres (6.6 ft) | 9846 | E1785 | 12 |
| Scoglio Palumbo Lighthouse | | 1881 | Trapani; 38°00′45.4″N 12°29′19.0″E | Fl W 5s. | 16 metres (52 ft) | 10044 | E1970 | 15 |
| Scogliitti Lighthouse | Image | 1904 | Vittoria; 36°53′32.6″N 14°25′39.8″E | Fl (3) W 10s. | 15 metres (49 ft) | 10180 | E1898 | 8 |
| Strombolicchio Lighthouse | | 1925 | Stromboli; 38°49′02.2″N 15°15′07.6″E | Fl (3) W 15s. | 57 metres (187 ft) | 9844 | E1802 | 11 |
| Termini Imerese; Diga Foranea di Sopraflutto Lighthouse | | n/a | Termini Imerese; 37°59′12.9″N 13°43′18.0″E | Fl G 3s. | 6 metres (20 ft) | 9892 | E2025 | 3 |
| Termini Imerese; Molo di Sottoflutto Lighthouse | | 1961 | Termini Imerese; 37°59′08.7″N 13°42′41.1″E | Fl R 3s. | 7 metres (23 ft) | 9876 | E2030 | 5 |
| Trapani; Diga Pescherecci Lighthouse | Image | n/a | Trapani; 38°00′47.9″N 12°29′58.5″E | Fl R 6s. | 7 metres (23 ft) | 10060 | E1979.2 | 4 |
| Trapani; Diga Sopraflutto Lighthouse | Image | n/a | Trapani; 38°00′18.8″N 12°29′50.0″E | Fl R 3s. | 7 metres (23 ft) | na | n/a | 8 |
| Trapani; Diga Sottoflutto Lighthouse | Image | n/a | Trapani; 38°00′18.7″N 12°30′02.5″E | Fl G 3s. | 7 metres (23 ft) | n/a | n/a | 8 |
| Trapani; Molo del Ronciglio | Image | 1884 est. | Trapani; 38°00′40.4″N 12°30′19.6″E | Fl G 3s. | 10 metres (33 ft) | 10052 | E1978 | 3 |
| Trapani; Molo Sanità Lighthouse | Image | n/a | Trapani; 38°00′47.4″N 12°30′25.2″E | F R | 6 metres (20 ft) | n/a | n/a | 3 |

== Tuscany ==
This is a list of lighthouses in Tuscany.

| Name | Image | Year built | Location & coordinates | Class of Light | Focal height | NGA number | Admiralty number | Range nml |
|---|---|---|---|---|---|---|---|---|
| Antignano; Molo Sud Lighthouse | | n/a | Livorno; 43°29′45.2″N 10°19′16.8″E | Fl G 3s. | 7 metres (23 ft) | 7936 | E1381 | 4 |
| Baratti Porto Lighthouse | | n/a | Baratti; 42°59′37.98″N 10°29′41.0″E | Fl W 3s. | 75 metres (246 ft) | 8988 | E1390 | 9 |
| Cala dello Scalo Lighthouse | | n/a | Gorgona; 43°25′51.6″N 9°54′27.2″E | Fl R 3s. | 8 metres (26 ft) | 8856 | E1394 | 2 |
| Capo Focardo Lighthouse | | 1863 | Forte Focardo; 42°45′15.53″N 10°24′34.82″E | Fl (3) W 15s. | 32 metres (105 ft) | 8948 | E2040 | 16 |
| Diga Curvilinea Lighthouse | | 1868 | Livorno; 43°32′34.49″N 10°17′21.7″E | Fl WR 3s. | 22 metres (72 ft) | 7888 | E1368 | white: 16 red: 12 |
| Diga Curvilinea estremità Nord Lighthouse | | 1857 | Livorno; 43°33′06.89″N 10°17′22.34″E | Fl RG 3s. | 7 metres (23 ft) | 7884 | E1370 | 5 |
| Diga del Marzocco Lighthouse | | 1917 | Livorno; 43°33′28.0″N 10°17′26.49″E | Fl (3) R 10s. | 13 metres (43 ft) | 7896 | E1360 | 7 |
| Diga della Meloria Lighthouse | | n/a | Livorno; 43°33′28.52″N 10°17′11.75″E | Fl (3) WG 10s. | 12 metres (39 ft) | 7880 | E1358 | white: 9 green: 7 |
| Diga Rettilinea Lighthouse | | n/a | Livorno; 43°33′03.91″N 10°17′41.43″E | Fl (2) R 6s. | 8 metres (26 ft) | 7912 | E1376.2 | 6 |
| Diga della Vegliaia Lighthouse | | 1895 est. | Livorno; 43°32′16.31″N 10°17′09.9″E | Fl G 3s. | 18 metres (59 ft) | 7924 | E1374 | 12 |
| Forte La Rocca Lighthouse | | 1862 | Porto Ercole; 42°23′24.15″N 11°12′44.47″E | L Fl WR 7s. | 91 metres (299 ft) | 9112 | E1500 | 16 |
| Giannutri Lighthouse | | 1882 | Giannutri; 42°14′22.1″N 11°06′28.75″E | Fl W 5s. | 61 metres (200 ft) | 9108 | E1496 | 13 |
| Giglio Porto; Moletto di Levante Lighthouse | Image | n/a | Isola del Giglio; 42°21′40.5″N 10°55′15.92″E | Fl R 3s. | 9 metres (30 ft) | 9096 | E1488 | 7 |
| Giglio Porto; Moletto di Ponente Lighthouse | Image | 1930 est. | Isola del Giglio; 42°21′38.86″N 10°55′13.25″E | Fl G 3s. | 9 metres (30 ft) | 9100 | E1490 | 7 |
| La Rocchetta Lighthouse | | 1928 | Piombino; 42°55′11.72″N 10°31′31.35″E | Fl (3) W 15s. | 18 metres (59 ft) | 8996 | E 1455 | 11 |
| Livorno Lighthouse; Fanale dei Pisani | | 1954 | Livorno; 43°32′37.64″N 10°17′41.46″E | Fl (4) W 20s. | 52 metres (171 ft) | 7892 | E1356 | 24 |
| Marina di Campo Lighthouse | Image | 1901 est. | Marina di Campo; 42°44′30.43″N 10°14′17.83″E | Fl W 3s. | 34 metres (112 ft) | 8956 | E1439 | 10 |
| Marina di Carrara Molo di Ponente Lighthouse | Image | 1956 | Marina di Carrara; 44°02′10.56″N 10°02′13.06″E | Fl W 3s. | 22 metres (72 ft) | 7832 | E1328 | 17 |
| Meloria north end Lighthouse | | 1958 | Meloria; 43°35′24.0″N 10°12′42.0″E | Fl (2) W 10s. | 18 metres (59 ft) | 7872 | E1347.8 | 10 |
| Meloria south end Lighthouse | | 1867 est. | Meloria; 43°32′45.9″N 10°13′07.9″E | Q (6) + L Fl W 10s. | 18 metres (59 ft) | 7876 | E1348 | 10 |
| Molo Mediceo Lighthouse | | 1919 est. | Livorno; 43°33′00.28″N 10°17′42.49″E | Fl (2) G 6s. | 7 metres (23 ft) | 7920 | E1380 | 6 |
| Monte Poro Lighthouse | | 1968 | Marina di Campo; 42°43′40.16″N 10°14′14.96″E | Fl W 5s. | 160 metres (520 ft) | 8952 | E1438 | 16 |
| Palmaiola Lighthouse | | 1844 | Palmaiola; 42°51′56.3″N 10°28′26.7″E | Fl W 5s. | 105 metres (344 ft) | 8992 | E1446 | 10 |
| Pianosa Lighthouse | | 1864 | Pianosa; 42°35′08.7″N 10°05′46.1″E | Fl (2) W 10s. | 42 metres (138 ft) | 8968 | E1448 | 16 |
| Portoferraio Lighthouse | | 1788 | Portoferraio; 42°48′58.7″N 10°20′02.7″E | Fl (3) W 14s. | 63 metres (207 ft) | 8896 | E1412 | 16 |
| Portoferraio; Moletto Sanità Lighthouse | Image | 1902 | Portoferraio; 42°48′49.29″N 10°19′42.92″E | F R | 7 metres (23 ft) | 8900 | E1415 | 3 |
| Punta Cala Scirocco Lighthouse | Image | n/a | Gorgona; 43°25′13.85″N 9°54′02.78″E | Fl (2) W 10s. | 45 metres (148 ft) | 8860 | E1396 | 9 |
| Punta di Capel Rosso Lighthouse | | 1883 | Isola del Giglio; 42°19′14.23″N 10°55′10.83″E | Fl (4) W 30s. | 90 metres (300 ft) | 9104 | E1492 | 23 |
| Punta Fenaio Lighthouse | Image | 1883 | Isola del Giglio; 42°23′18.19″N 10°52′52.03″E | Fl (3) W 15s. | 39 metres (128 ft) | 9092 | E1486 | 16 |
| Punta Ferraione Lighthouse | | 1908 | Capraia; 43°03′04.2″N 9°50′39.27″E | L Fl W 6s. | 30 metres (98 ft) | 8864 | E1400 | 16 |
| Punta Lividonia Lighthouse | Image | 1926 | Porto Santo Stefano; 42°26′47.14″N 11°06′14.35″E | Fl W 5s. | 47 metres (154 ft) | 9076 | E1480 | 16 |
| Punta Paratella Lighthouse | Image | 1937 est. | Gorgona; 43°26′13.78″N 9°54′09.12″E | L Fl W 10s. | 105 metres (344 ft) | 8852 | E1392 | 9 |
| Punta Polveraia Lighthouse | Image | 1909 | Marciana; 42°47′40.07″N 10°06′37.83″E | L Fl (3) W 15s. | 52 metres (171 ft) | 8884 | E1444 | 16 |
| Scoglietto Lighthouse | | 1945 | Portoferraio; 42°49′42.8″N 10°19′51.8″E | Fl (2) W 6s. | 24 metres (79 ft) | 8892 | E1410 | 5 |
| Scoglio d'Africa Lighthouse | Image | 1867 est. | Scoglio d'Africa; 42°21′29.55″N 10°03′50.82″E | Fl W 5s. | 19 metres (62 ft) | 8976 | E1454 | 12 |
| Scoglio Formiche di Grosseto Lighthouse | | 1919 | Formiche di Grosseto; 42°34′35.2″N 10°52′55.1″E | Fl W 6s. | 23 metres (75 ft) | 9056 | E1474 | 11 |
| Talamone Lighthouse | | 1865 | Talamone; 42°33′05.76″N 11°08′02.14″E | Fl (2) W 10s. | 30 metres (98 ft) | 9060 | E1476 | 15 |
| Vada Shoal Lighthouse | | 1959 | Vada; 43°19′12.58″N 10°21′49.32″E | Fl (2) W 10s. | 18 metres (59 ft) | 8980 | E1384 | 12 |
| Viareggio Diga Foranea Lighthouse | | 1993 | Viareggio; 43°51′28.69″N 10°14′14.32″E | Fl W 5s. | 30 metres (98 ft) | 7856 | E1340 | 24 |
| Viareggio; Molo Marinai d'Italia Lighthouse | | 1872 est. | Viareggio; 43°51′44.1″N 10°13′58.9″E | Iso G 3s. | 9 metres (30 ft) | 7860 | E1342 | 9 |
| Viareggio; Molo Nord Lighthouse | Image | 1872 est. | Viareggio; 43°51′44.0″N 10°14′07.0″E | Iso R 3s. | 9 metres (30 ft) | 7864 | E1341 | 7 |

== Veneto ==
This is a list of lighthouses in Veneto.

| Name | Image | Year built | Location & coordinates | Class of Light | Focal height | NGA number | Admiralty number | Range nml |
|---|---|---|---|---|---|---|---|---|
| Albarella Lighthouse | Image | 1971 | Rosolina; 45°04′09.4″N 12°20′41.9″E | L Fl W 6s. | 55 metres (180 ft) | 11448 | E2443 | 15 |
| Caorle Lighthouse | | 1905 | Caorle; 45°36′00.1″N 12°53′34.8″E | Fl (2) W 6s. | 12 metres (39 ft) | 11568 | E2508 | 14 |
| Chioggia Lighthouse | Image | 1996 | Chioggia; 45°13′46.7″N 12°17′51.2″E | L Fl (2) W 10s. | 20 metres (66 ft) | 11452 | E2450 | 15 |
| Chioggia; Diga Nord Lighthouse | Image | 1936 est. | Chioggia; 45°14′01.2″N 12°18′51.23″E | Fl G 3s. | 11 metres (36 ft) | 11468 | E2456 | 8 |
| Chioggia; Diga Sud Lighthouse | Image | 1936 est. | Chioggia; 45°13′43.08″N 12°18′48.73″E | Fl R 10s. | 11 metres (36 ft) | 11464 | E2453 | 8 |
| Lido Fanale Anteriore Lighthouse | | 1912 est. | Lido di Venezia; 45°26′16.92″N 12°23′24.1″E | Fl W 3s. | 13 metres (43 ft) | 11524 | E2486 | 11 |
| Lido; Molo Nord Lighthouse | | 1908 | Lido di Venezia; 45°25′21.9″N 12°26′12.2″E | L Fl (2) W 12s. | 26 metres (85 ft) | 11516 | E2480 | 15 |
| Lido; Molo Sud Lighthouse | | 1913 | Lido di Venezia; 45°25′04.44″N 12°25′37.53″E | Fl R 3s. | 14 metres (46 ft) | 11520 | E2484 | 7 |
| Malamocco; Molo Nord Lighthouse | | 1874 est. | Malamocco; 45°20′02.05″N 12°20′35.73″E | Fl G 5s. | 18 metres (59 ft) | 11500 | E2466 | 8 |
| Malamocco; Molo Nuovo Foraneo Lighthouse | Image | 2006 | Malamocco; 45°19′45.4″N 12°20′41.69″E | Fl R 5s. | 18 metres (59 ft) | n/a | E2466.2 | 8 |
| Malamocco; Molo Sud Lighthouse | Image | 1912 est. | Malamocco; 45°19′39.71″N 12°19′46.34″E | Fl R 3s. | 16 metres (52 ft) | 11496 | E2467 | 8 |
| Murano Lighthouse | | 1912 | Murano; 45°27′10.2″N 12°21′16.4″E | Ov W 6s. | 37 metres (121 ft) | 11528 | E2486.1 | 21 |
| Porto Piave Vecchia Lighthouse | | 1950 | Cavallino-Treporti; 45°28′42.9″N 12°34′59.5″E | Fl (4) W 20s. | 48 metres (157 ft) | 11556 | E2504 | 15 |
| Punta della Maestra Lighthouse | Image | 1949 | Porto Tolle; 44°58′07.3″N 12°31′46.2″E | Fl (3) W 20s. | 47 metres (154 ft) | 11436 | E2440 | 25 |
| Punta Tagliamento Lighthouse | | 1913 | San Michele al Tagliamento; 45°38′10.6″N 13°05′51.3″E | Fl (3) W 10s. | 22 metres (72 ft) | 11572 | E2518 | 15 |
| Rocchetta Lighthouse | | 1855 est. | Lido di Venezia; 45°20′21.7″N 12°18′40.2″E | Fl (3) W 12s. | 25 metres (82 ft) | 11488 | E2464 | 16 |
| Venezia; Canale San Marco Lighthouse | Image | 1933 | Venetian Lagoon; 45°25′13.17″N 12°21′46.76″E | Fl (2) R 10s. | 7 metres (23 ft) | 11548 | E2492 | 5 |

== See also ==
- Lists of lighthouses and lightvessels
- Marina Militare
