= Scoglio Palumbo Lighthouse =

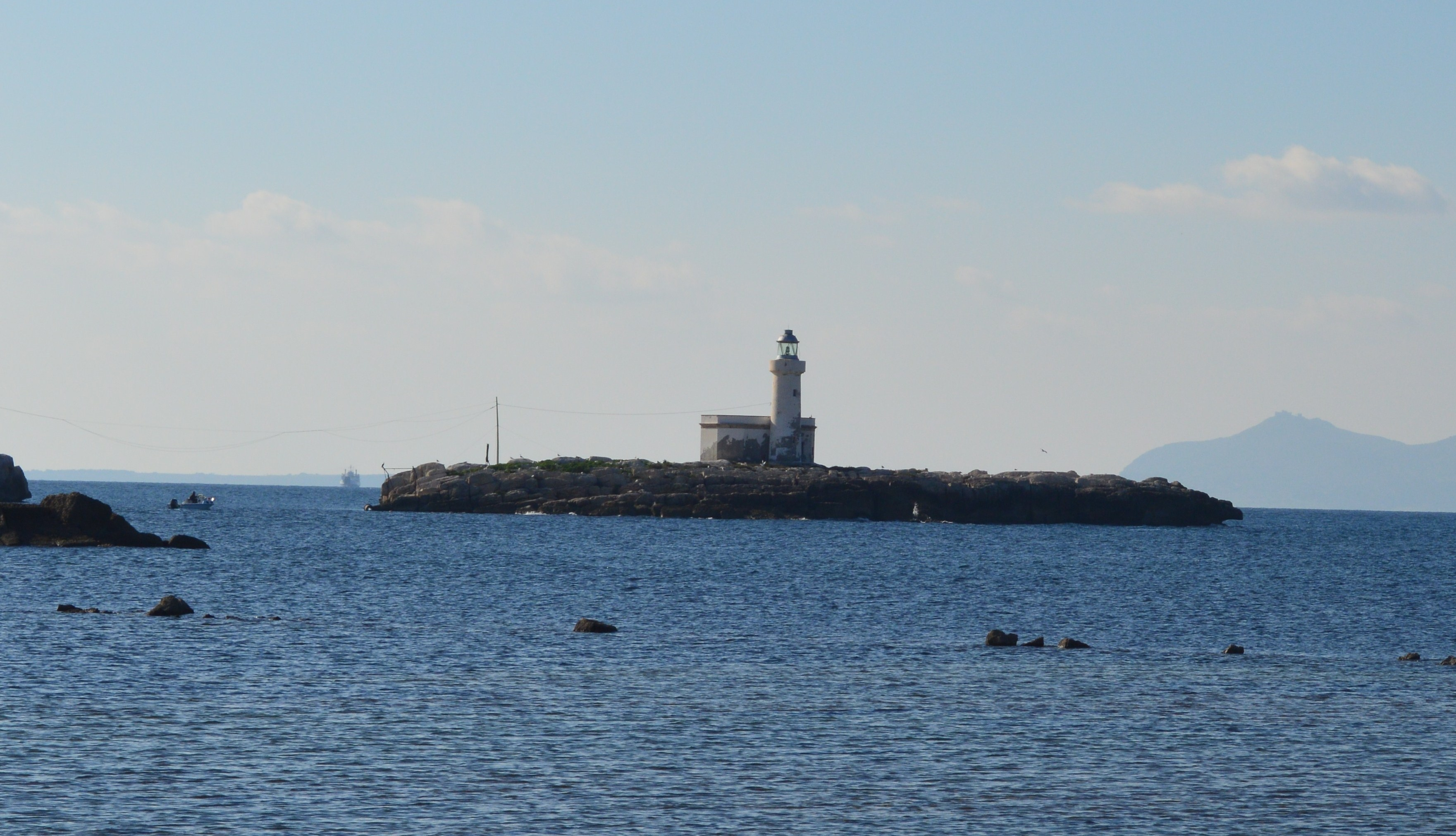
- Location: Trapani; Sicily; Italy
- Coordinates: 38°00′45″N 12°29′19″E

Tower
- Constructed: 1881
- Foundation: concrete base
- Construction: masonry tower
- Height: 12 metres (39 ft)
- Shape: cylindrical tower with balcony and lantern adjacent to the keeper's house
- Markings: white tower and lantern, grey metallic lantern dome
- Power source: solar power
- Operator: Marina Militare

Light
- Focal height: 16 metres (52 ft)
- Range: 11 nautical miles (20 km; 13 mi)
- Characteristic: Fl W 5s.

Scoglio Palumbo Lighthouse (Italian: Faro di Scoglio Palumbo) is an active lighthouse located on an islet 102 metres (335 ft) long and 67 metres (220 ft) wide just 0.6 nautical miles (1.1 km; 0.69 mi) west of the entrance to the port of Trapani on the Sicily Channel.

== Description ==
The lighthouse, built in 1881 by Genio civile, consists of a cylindrical tower, 12 metres (39 ft) high, with balcony and lantern. The tower and the lantern are white and the lantern dome is grey metallic. The light is positioned at 16 metres (52 ft) above sea level and emits one white flash in a 5 seconds period visible up to a distance of 11 nautical miles (20 km; 13 mi). The lighthouse is completely automated powered by a solar unit and managed by the Marina Militare with the identification code number 3138 E.F.

== See also ==
- List of lighthouses in Italy
