= Punta Pioppeto Lighthouse =

Lighthouse in Italy

Punta Pioppeto
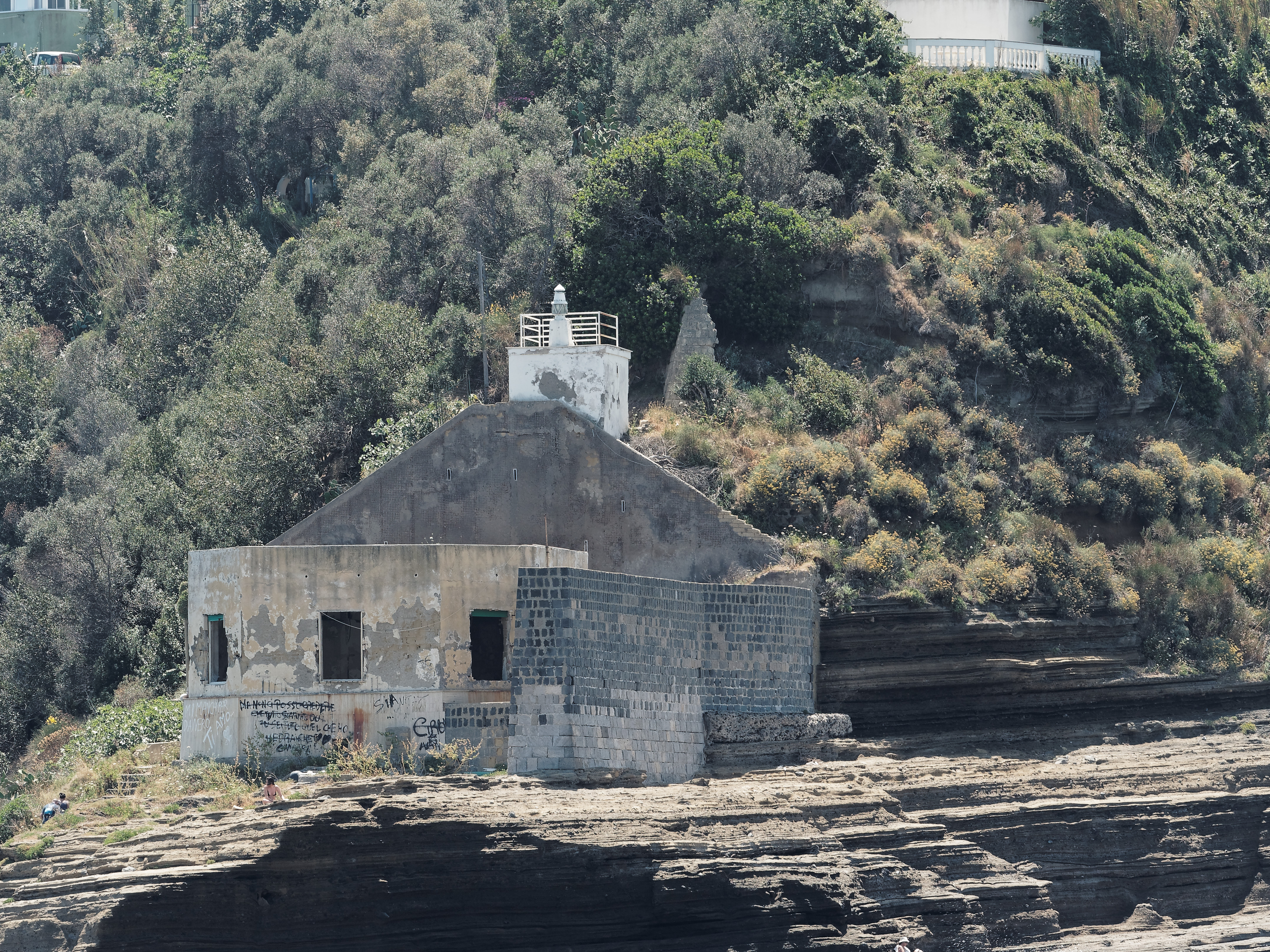
- Punta Pioppeto Lighthouse
- Location: Procida; Campania; Italy
- Coordinates: 40°46′13″N 14°01′01″E

Tower
- Constructed: 1849
- Construction: masonry building
- Automated: yes
- Height: 3 metres (9.8 ft)
- Shape: post atop a 1-storey equipment building
- Markings: white building
- Power source: mains electricity
- Operator: Marina Militare

Light
- Focal height: 21 metres (69 ft)
- Lens: Type TD
- Intensity: LABI 100 W
- Range: 11 nautical miles (20 km; 13 mi)
- Characteristic: Fl (3) W 10s.
- Italy no.: 2358 E.F.

Punta Pioppeto Lighthouse (Italian: Faro di Punta Pioppeto) is an active lighthouse located on the northernmost promontory of Procida, Campania on the Tyrrhenian Sea.

== Description ==
The lighthouse was built in 1849 and consisted of 1-storey octagonal base keeper's house, now in a state of completely disuse and devastation, since the last keeper left and the lighthouse was automated. The active lighthouse is a post atop a 1-storey equipment white building, 10 feet (3.0 m) high, located in a higher position. The light is positioned at 21 metres (69 ft) above sea level and emits three white flashes in a 10 seconds period, visible up to a distance of 11 nautical miles (20 km; 13 mi). The lighthouse is completely automated and operated by the Marina Militare with the identification code number 2358 E.F.

== See also ==
- List of lighthouses in Italy
- Procida
