= Punta della Guardia Lighthouse =

Lighthouse in Lazio, Italy

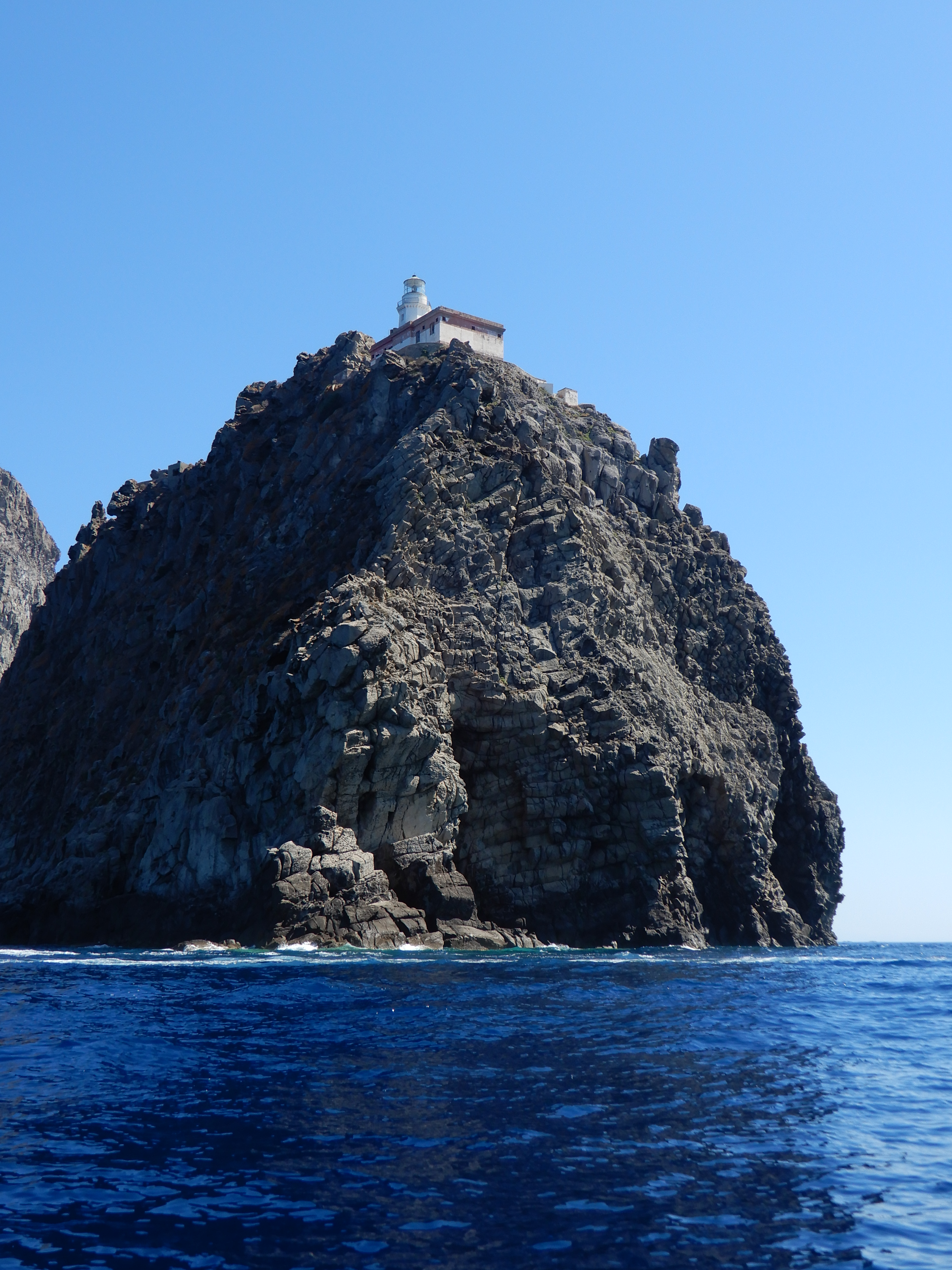
- The lighthouse
- Location: Ponza; Lazio; Italy
- Coordinates: 40°52′40″N 12°57′13″E

Tower
- Constructed: 1886
- Height: 17 metres (56 ft)
- Shape: octagonal tower with gallery and lantern

Light
- First lit: 1886
- Focal height: 112 metres (367 ft)
- Range: 24 nmi (44 km; 28 mi)
- Characteristic: Fl(3) W 30s
- Italy no.: 2278 E.F

Punta della Guardia Lighthouse (Italian: Faro di Punta della Guardia) is an active lighthouse in Ponza, Italy.

== History ==
The Island of Ponza is the largest of the Pontine Islands. A previous lighthouse, dating from 1866, was located 226 meters above sea level. The current lighthouse was activated in 1886, and has been autonomous since the 1970s.

== Description ==
The structure stands on a large cliff connected to the rest of the island by a very narrow isthmus. It consists of a 17-meter-high octagonal masonry tower, with a gallery and lantern.

== Gallery ==
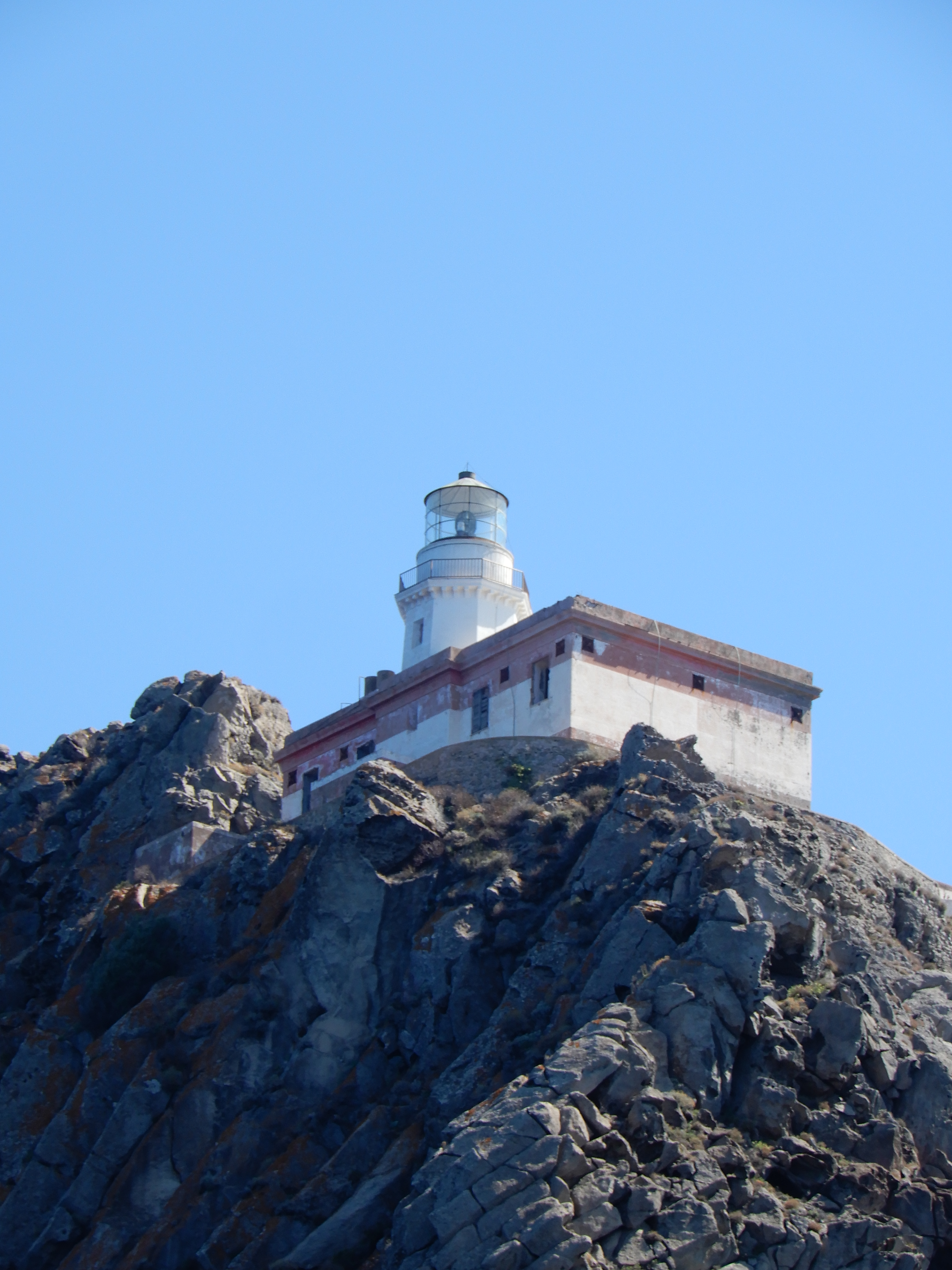

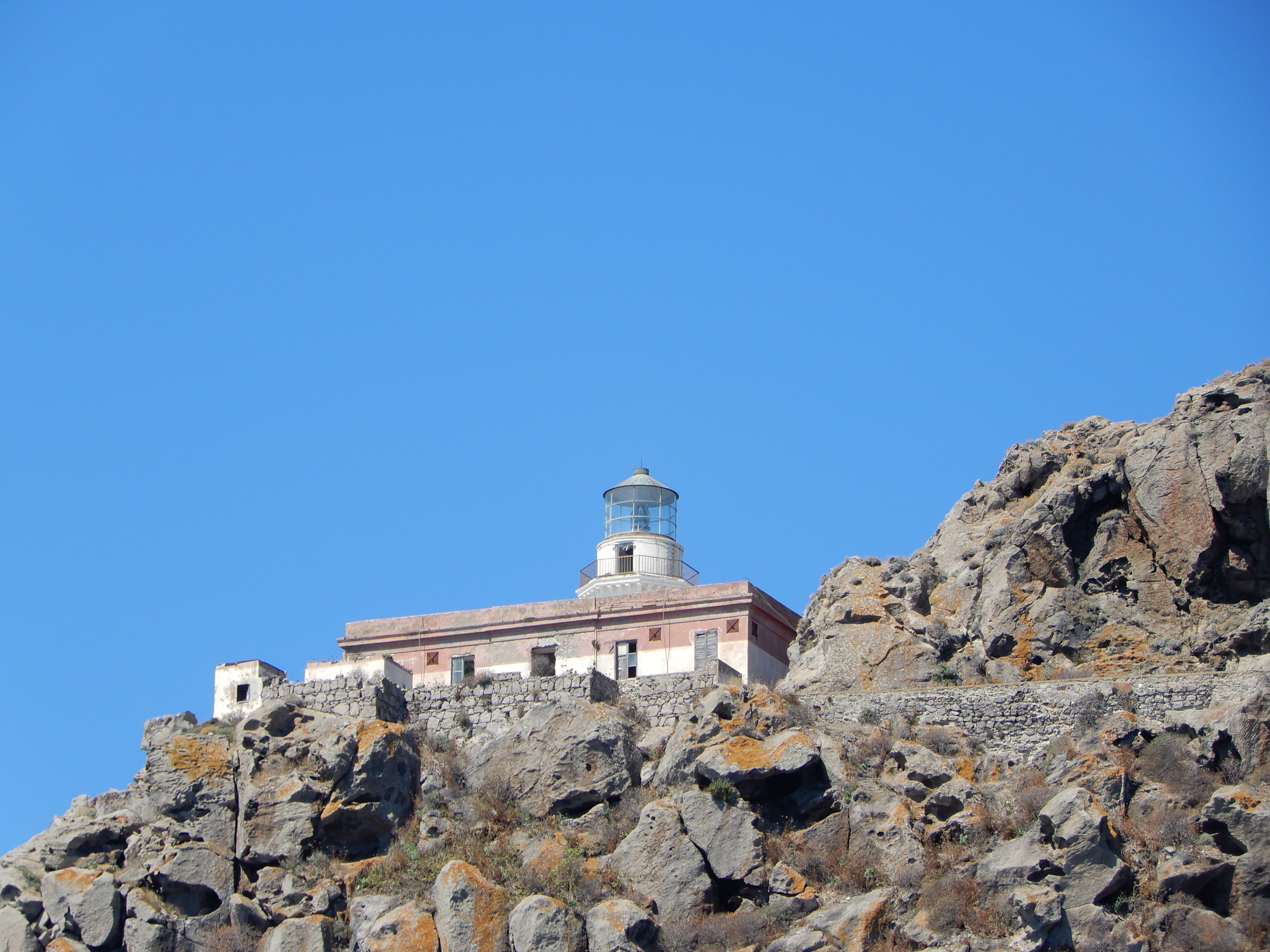

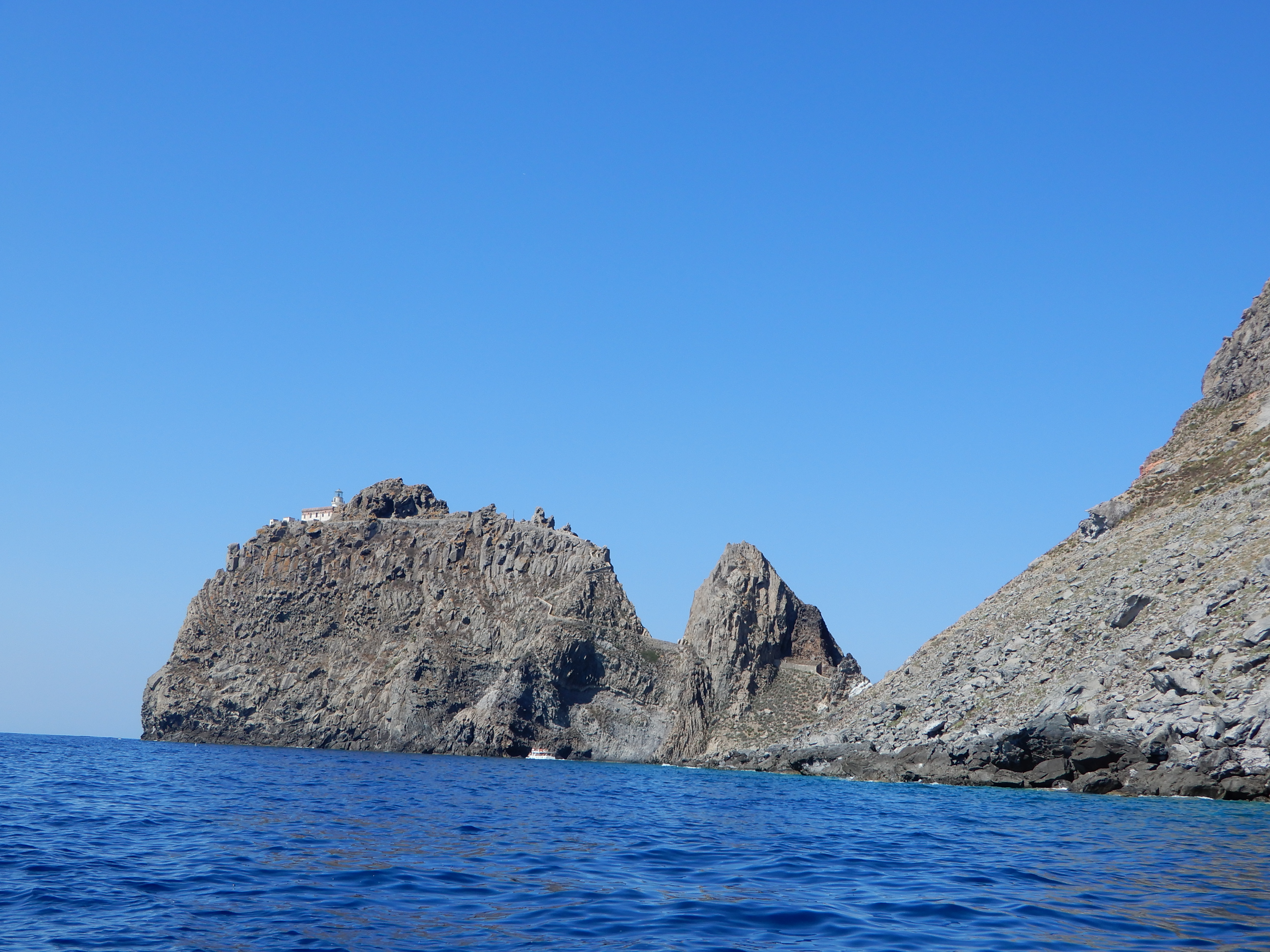

== See also ==
- List of lighthouses in Italy
