= White Beaches =

Natural coastline in Tuscany, Italy

Coordinates: 43°22′21.73″N 10°26′24.32″E

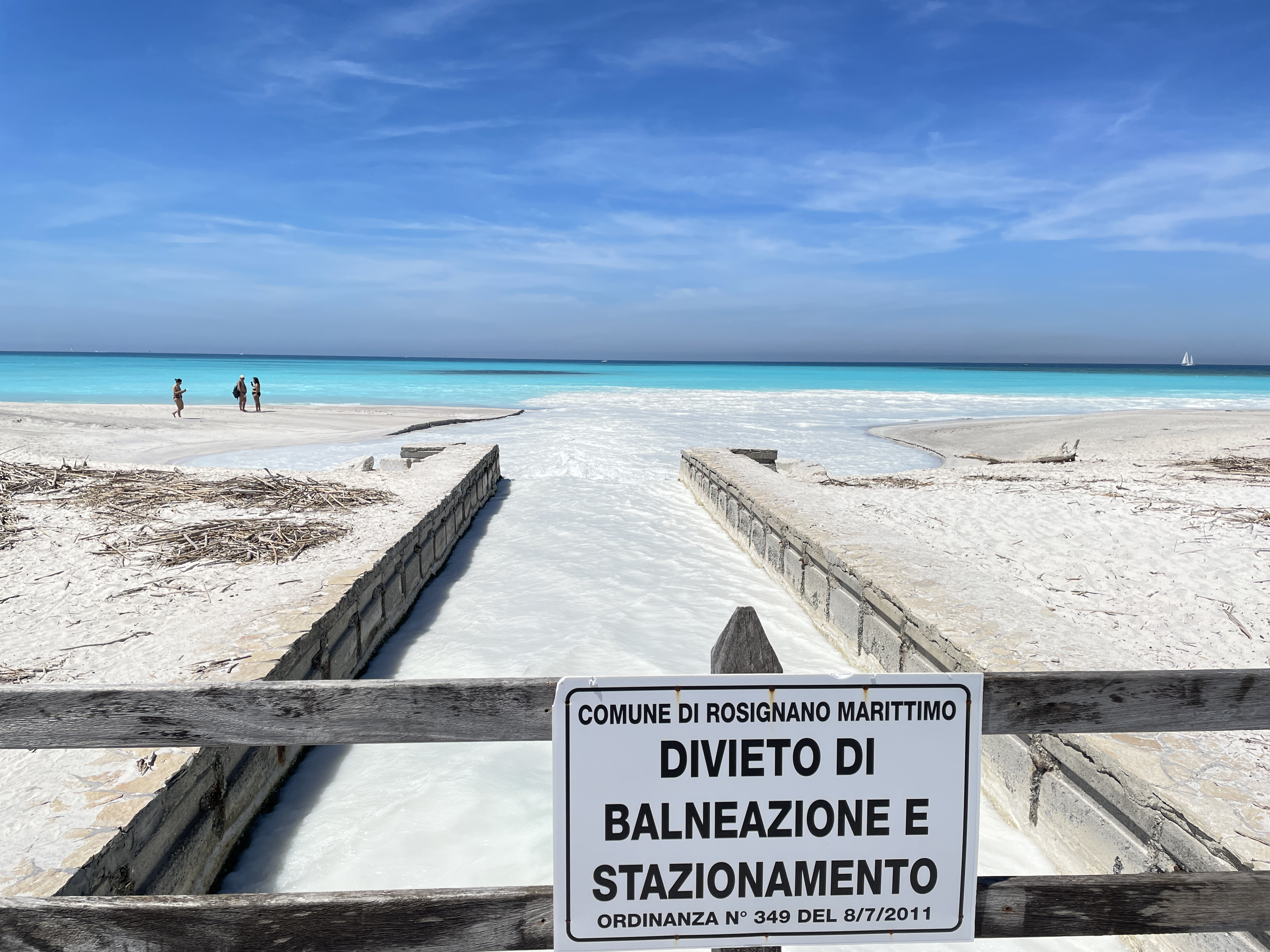
On the foreground, the point where the discharge from the Solvay factory pours into the sea, whitening the sands in an almost "tropical" appearance (background).

The White Beaches (Italian: Spiagge Bianche) are a stretch of about five kilometers of sandy coastline located in the municipality of Rosignano Marittimo in Tuscany, between the hamlets of Rosignano Solvay and the center of the hamlet of Vada. Bathed by the Thyrrenian sea, they are located at the northernmost edge of the Maremma coastline.

The unusual color of the sand, which leads to comparisons with tropical coastlines, is the result of years of processing and discharge of calcium carbonate by a Solvay Group plant located in Rosignano Solvay, about a kilometer from the coast. The soda plant, which is the largest in Europe, was built in 1912 near the beach and began operations in 1914, producing, in addition to soda ash, hydrogen peroxide, polyethylene, calcium chloride, sodium bicarbonate, and hydrochloric acid. Access to the beach is via a small hill that until 1983 served as a dump for production waste and domestic refuse.

Due to the Solvay discharges, which include various pollutants toxic and/or carcinogenic (including mercury, once released during processing through the sodium chloride electrolysis plant), Spiagge Bianche is among the most polluted beaches in Italy, and fishing in the surrounding waters is extremely limited. Additionally, this stretch of coast is among the 15 most polluted coastal sites in Italy according to the United Nations Environment Programme, the United Nations environmental program. Over 100,000 tons of waste are discharged into the sea each year. Despite this, even in the years before the industry's conversion, this stretch of coast has been awarded the Blue Flag several times and Spiagge Bianche remains one of the most popular seaside destinations in Tuscany despite the strict ban on swimming and lingering issued by the municipality of Rosignano near the industrial waste discharge.

In July 1994 the players of Rugby Rosignano gathered on the beach for a sangria party; the following year, the private event expanded to friends and others, and by 2003, it attracted 25,000 people to the area. In 2004, due to the high number of attendees, and as a result of some disruptions and unauthorized activities, the municipality of Rosignano Marittimo decided to suspend the event.
