= Misericordia =

Misericordia is the Latin word for "mercy", derived from misericors, "merciful", which is in turn derived from misereri, "to pity", and cor, "heart", and may refer to:

== Places and organisations ==
- Misericórdia, a parish in the municipality of Lisbon, Portugal
- Misericórdia Church, Sé, Braga, Portugal
- Misericordia Community Hospital, Edmonton, Canada
- Misericordia Health Centre, Winnipeg, Canada
- Misericordia Home, Chicago, Illinois
- Misericordia Hospital (Grosseto), Grosseto, Italy
- Misericordia Hospital, the Bronx, New York City
- Misericordia University, Dallas, Pennsylvania
- Mater Misericordiae University Hospital, Dublin, Ireland
- Archconfraternity of the Misericordia, a Roman Catholic religious congregation
- Castelnuovo della Misericordia, a village in Italy
- Abbazia della Misericordia, a religious edifice in Venice, Italy
- Sant'Anna la Misericordia, a Baroque church of Palermo
- Museu da Misericórdia do Porto, Portugal
- Kapela Misericordia, a Roman Catholic chapel in Pantai Besar, Larantuka, East Flores, East Nusa Tenggara, Indonesia

== Documents ==
- Dives in misericordia, a papal document of Pope John Paul II
- Misericordiae vultus, another papal document of Pope Francis
- Misericordia Dei, the title of an apostolic letter by Pope John Paul II
- Misericordia et Misera, an ecclesiastical letter authored by Pope Francis

== Film ==
- Misericordia (2023 film), 2023 Italian film directed by Emma Dante
- Misericordia (2024 film), 2024 French-language film directed by Alain Guiraudie
- Mercy (Misericordia), 1953 film directed by Zacarías Gómez Urquiza

== Other uses ==
- Banner of Misericordia, a work of the Catalan architect Antoni Gaudí
- Misericordia Sunday, a Sunday in Eastertide in the Christian liturgical calendar
- Ríos de Misericordia, a Mexican Christian musical group
- A blade used by the Legio/Adeptus Custodes: the personal guard of the God-Emperor of Mankind in the fictional Warhammer 40000 universe.

== See also ==
- Misericord, church ornament
- Misericorde (disambiguation)
