= WLVF =

WLVF can refer to:

- WLVF-FM, a radio station (90.3 FM) licensed to Haines City, Florida, United States
- Waist-level viewfinder or waist-level finder, a camera feature
- WLVF (AM), a defunct radio station (930 AM) formerly licensed to Haines City, Florida, United States
