= Pasquini Castle =

Castle in Castiglioncello, Tuscany, built beginning in 1889

- Castello Pasquini
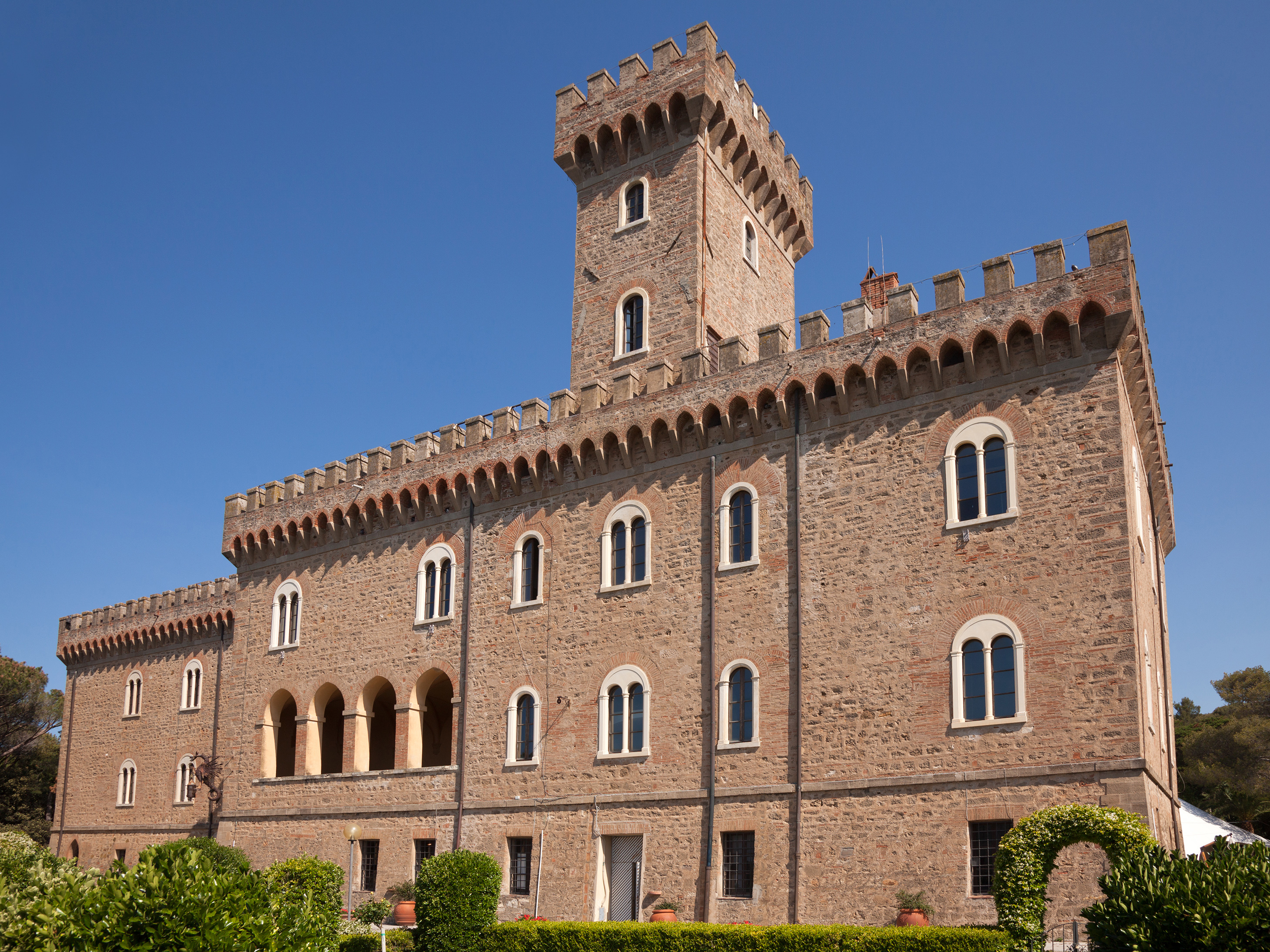
- View of Castello Pasquini
- Interactive map of the Pasquini Castle area

General information
- Type: Castle
- Architectural style: Gothic Revival
- Location: Castiglioncello, Italy
- Coordinates: 43°24′19″N 10°24′45″E
- Current tenants: Comune of Rosignano Marittimo
- Construction started: 1889

The Pasquini Castle (Italian: Castello Pasquini) stands in Castiglioncello, in the Comune of Rosignano Marittimo, near the railway station.

== History ==
The Pasquini Castle was built starting from 1889 as the residence of Baron Lazzaro Patrone, who at the same time had purchased large plots of land from Diego Martelli. During the works the old buildings of the past property were demolished, while the agricultural land was transformed into a lush park of romantic imprint.

The castle, built in imitation of medieval buildings, was flanked by the house of the cashier, in Gothic Revival architecture, and a chapel decorated according to Eclecticism trends.

Moreover, Baron Patrone offered part of his land for the construction of the railway station of Castiglioncello, on the condition that the travellers' building took up the style of the castle in order to harmonize with it. The same baron was also interested in the development of the entire locality, but his projects, like that of the hippodrome, were not followed.

In 1938 the castle was sold to other owners and around the forties it was bought by the Pasquini family. After a period of abandonment, in 1981, became the property of the municipal administration of Rosignano Marittimo, which over time has made it the center of a series of events and cultural events, such as literary prize Castiglioncello-Costa degli Etruschi.

== Photo gallery ==
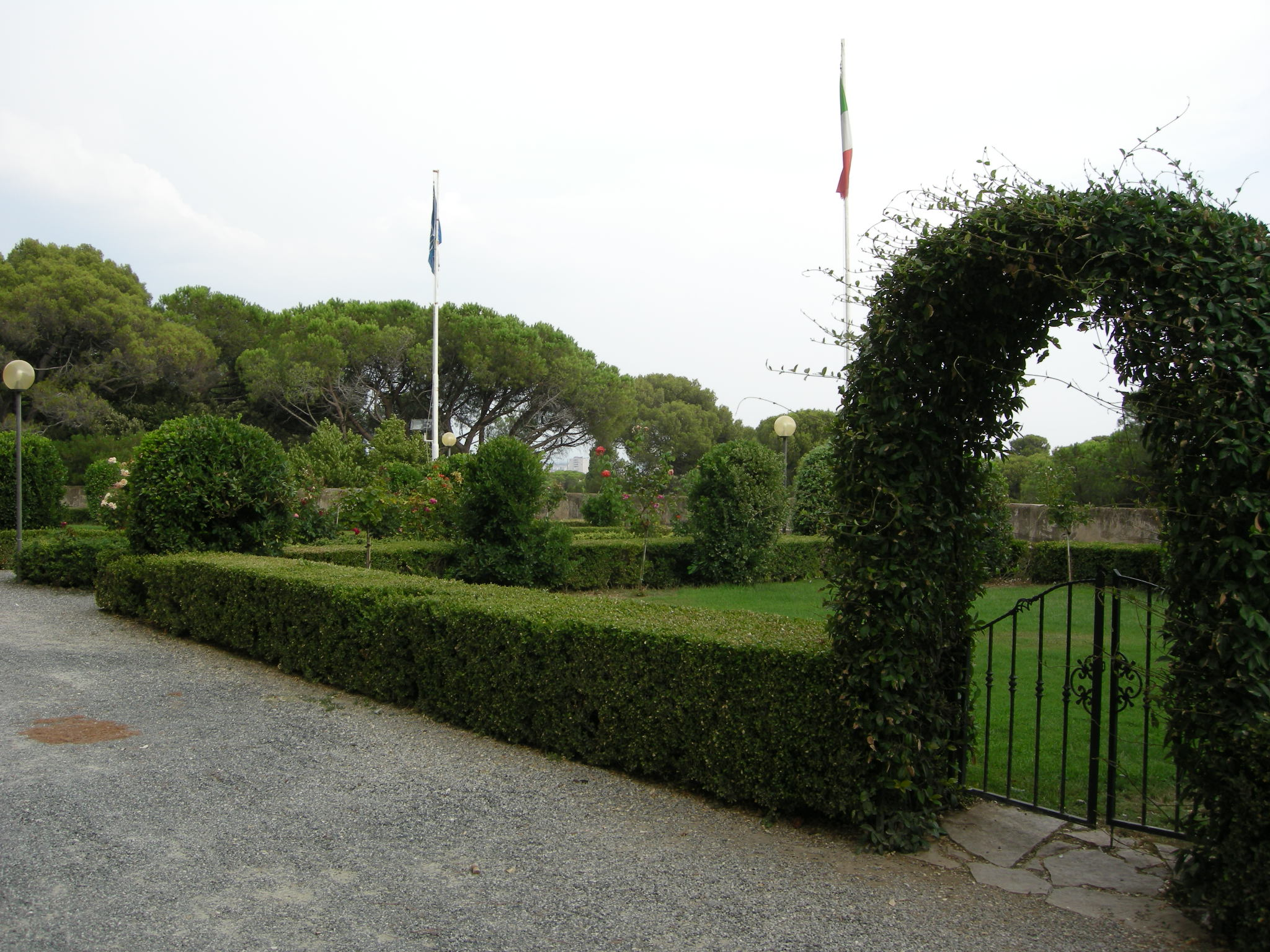
The gardens

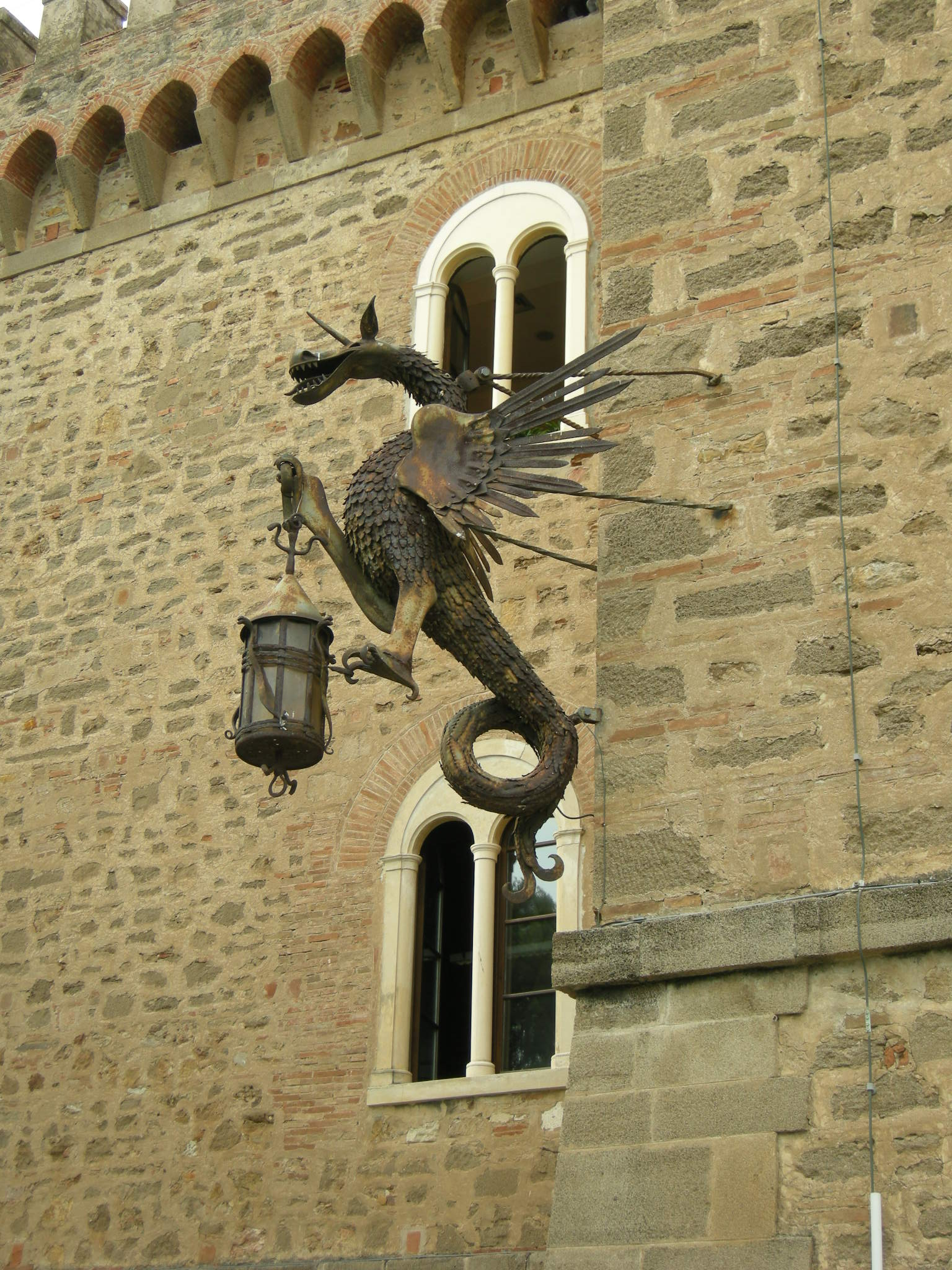
Torch holder dragon

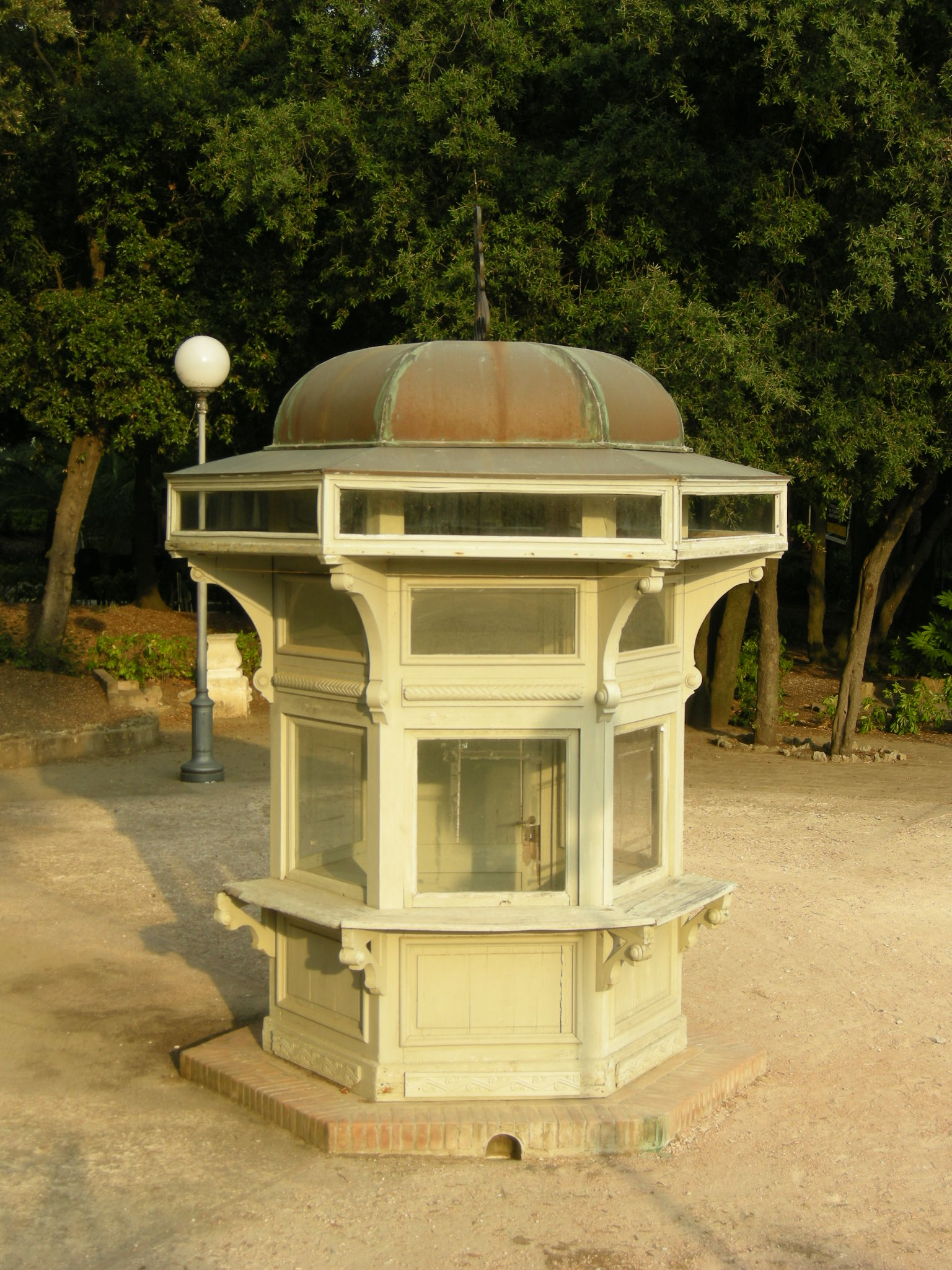
Aedicula in the park

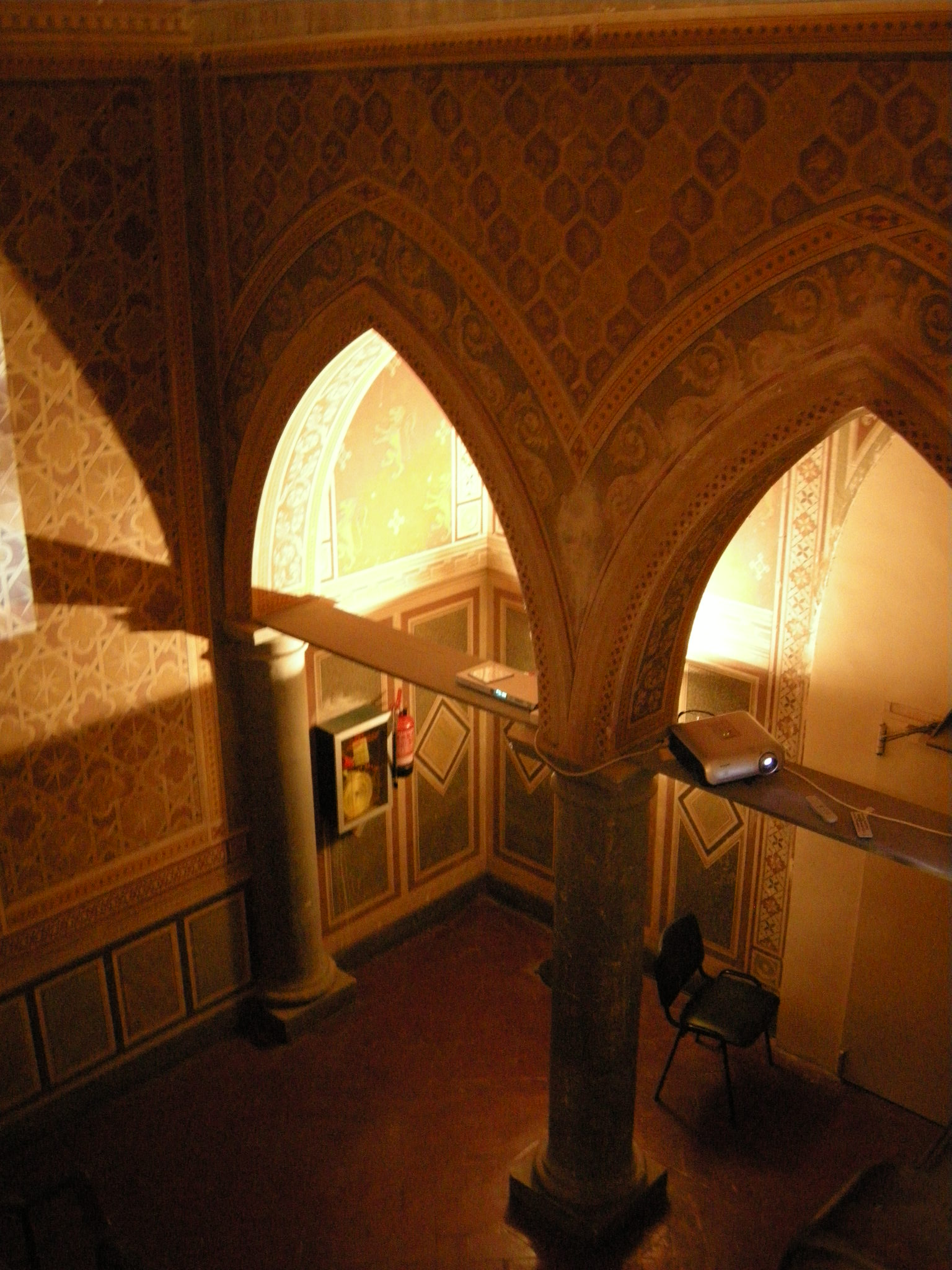
Interior view

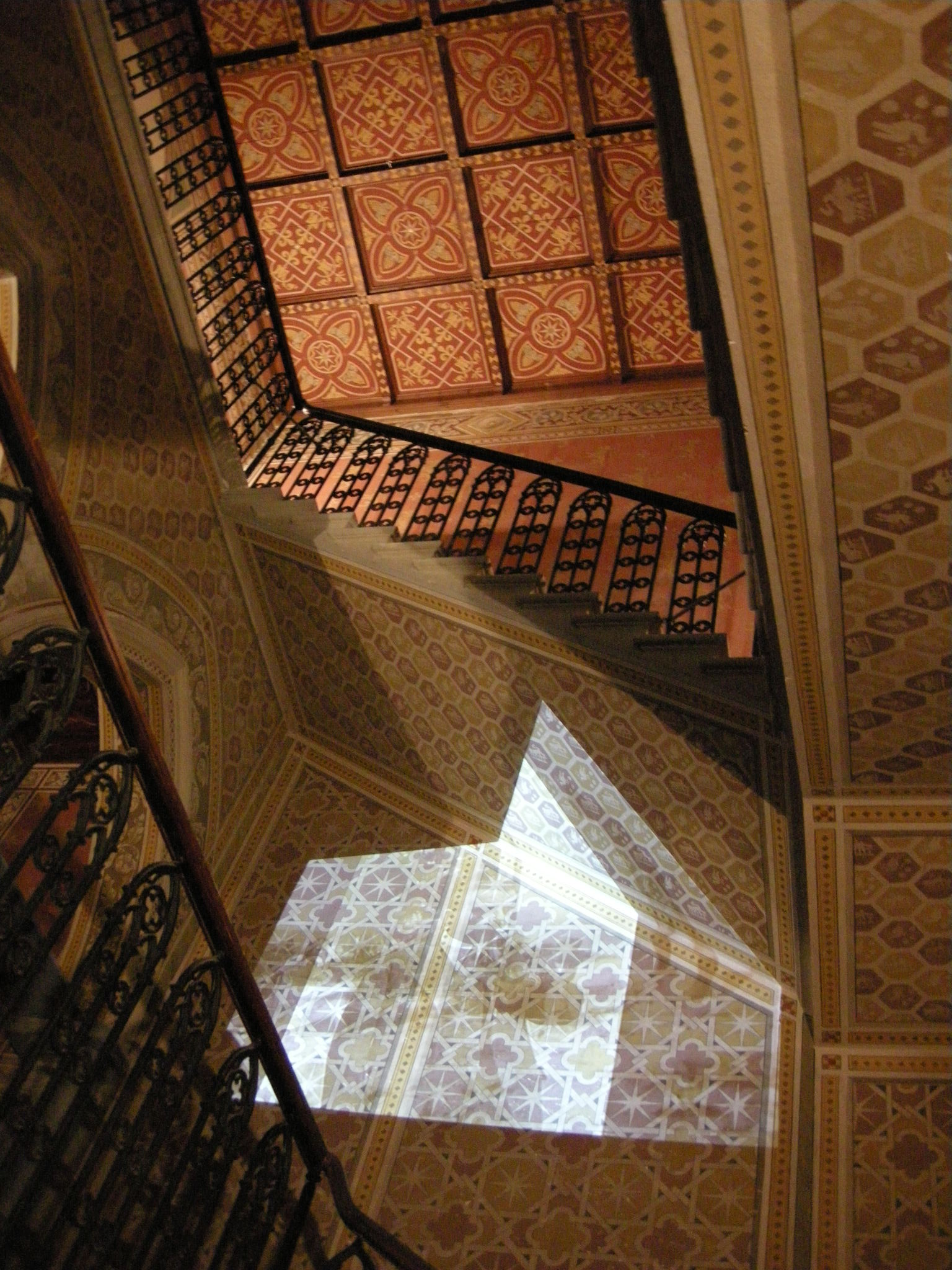
Interior view

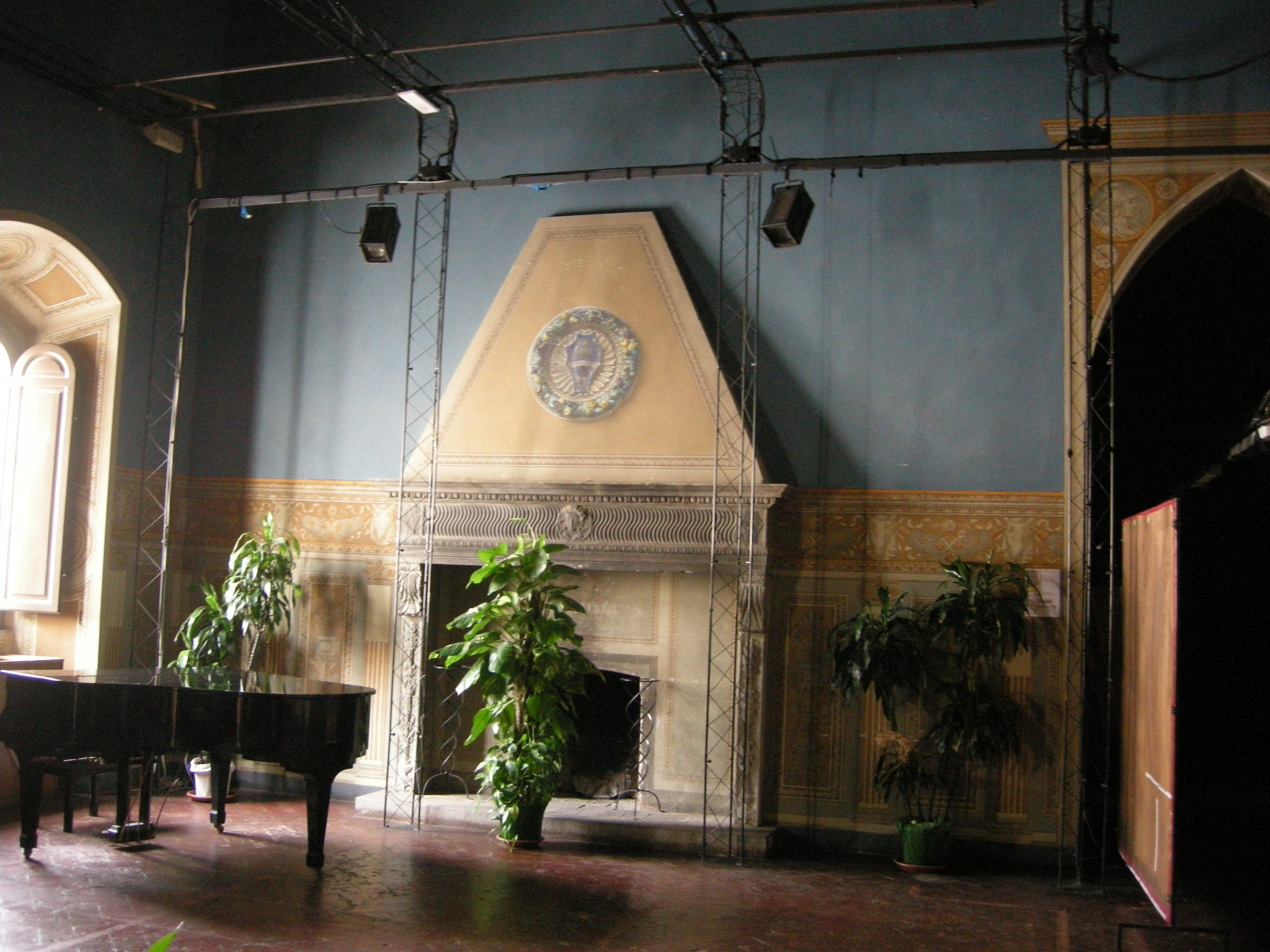
Interior view

== See also ==
- Castiglioncello
