= Mastromarino =

Mastromarino is an Italian surname. Notable people with the surname include:

- Alberto Mastromarino (1963–2025), Italian baritone
- Mariano Mastromarino (born 1982), Argentine athlete
- Michael Mastromarino (died 2013), American illegal body parts harvester
- Michele Mastromarino (1894–1986), Italian gymnast
