= Castiglioncello railway station =

Railway station in Castiglioncello, Italy

Castiglioncello
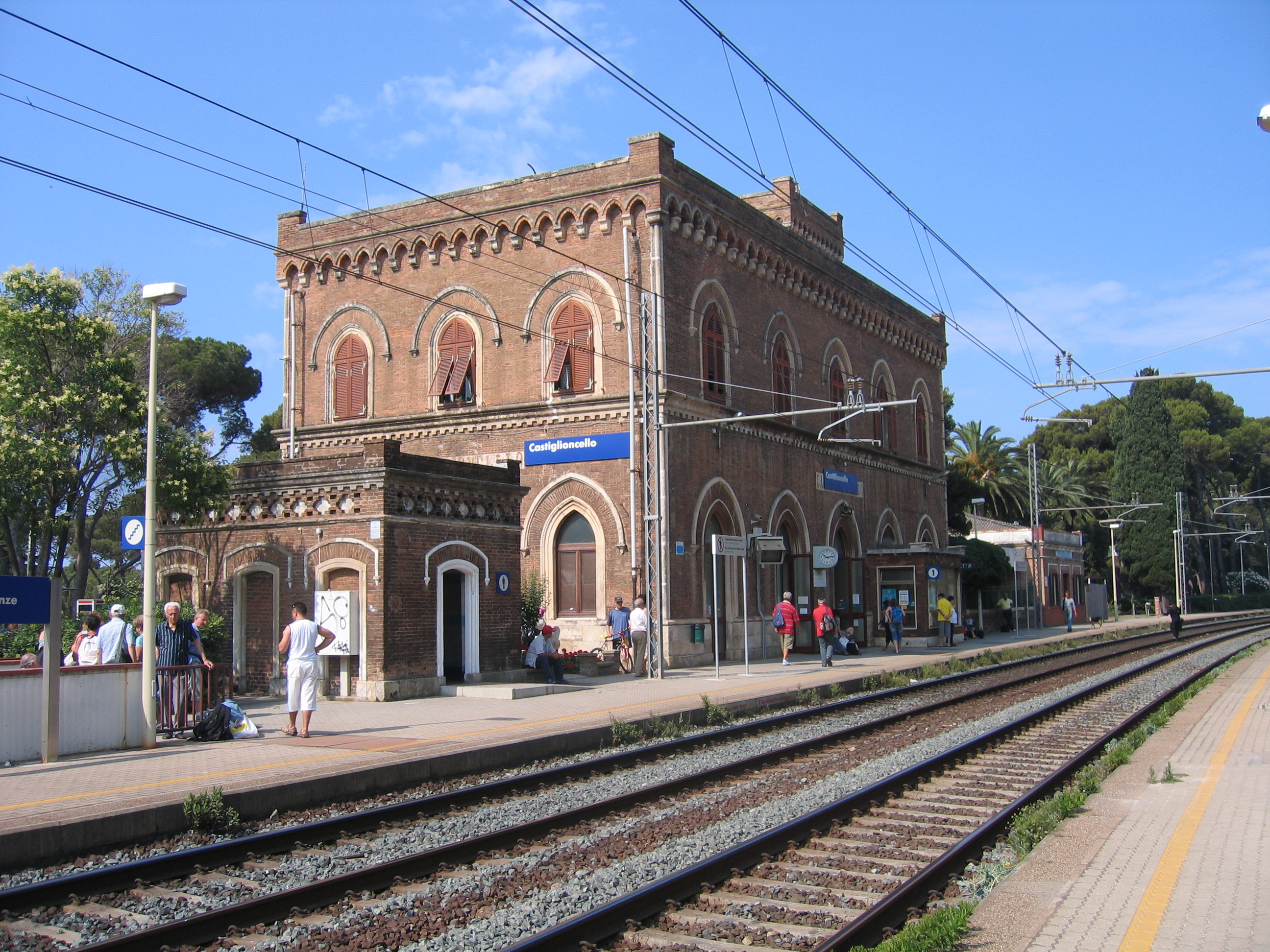
- The station viewed from the platforms, in 2009

General information
- Location: Castiglioncello; Italy
- Coordinates: 43°24′16.20″N 10°24′51.84″E
- Elevation: 3 metres (9.8 ft)
- Owner: RFI
- Line: Roma-Pisa railway
- Distance: 21.055 kilometres (13.083 mi)
- Platforms: 2
- Train operators: Trenitalia

Construction
- Architect: Giuseppe De Montel

History
- Opened: 1909
Location

Castiglioncello railway station is an Italian secondary railway station located in Castiglioncello, in the municipality of Rosignano Marittimo, Province of Livorno, Tuscany.

== History ==
The station opened in 1910, one year after the coastal section of the railway was inaugurated.

== Services ==
- Automatic ticket machine
- Toilet
