= Igreja da Misericórdia de Tavira =

Church in Portugal classified as a National Monument

Coordinates: 37.1258805°N 7.6507086°W

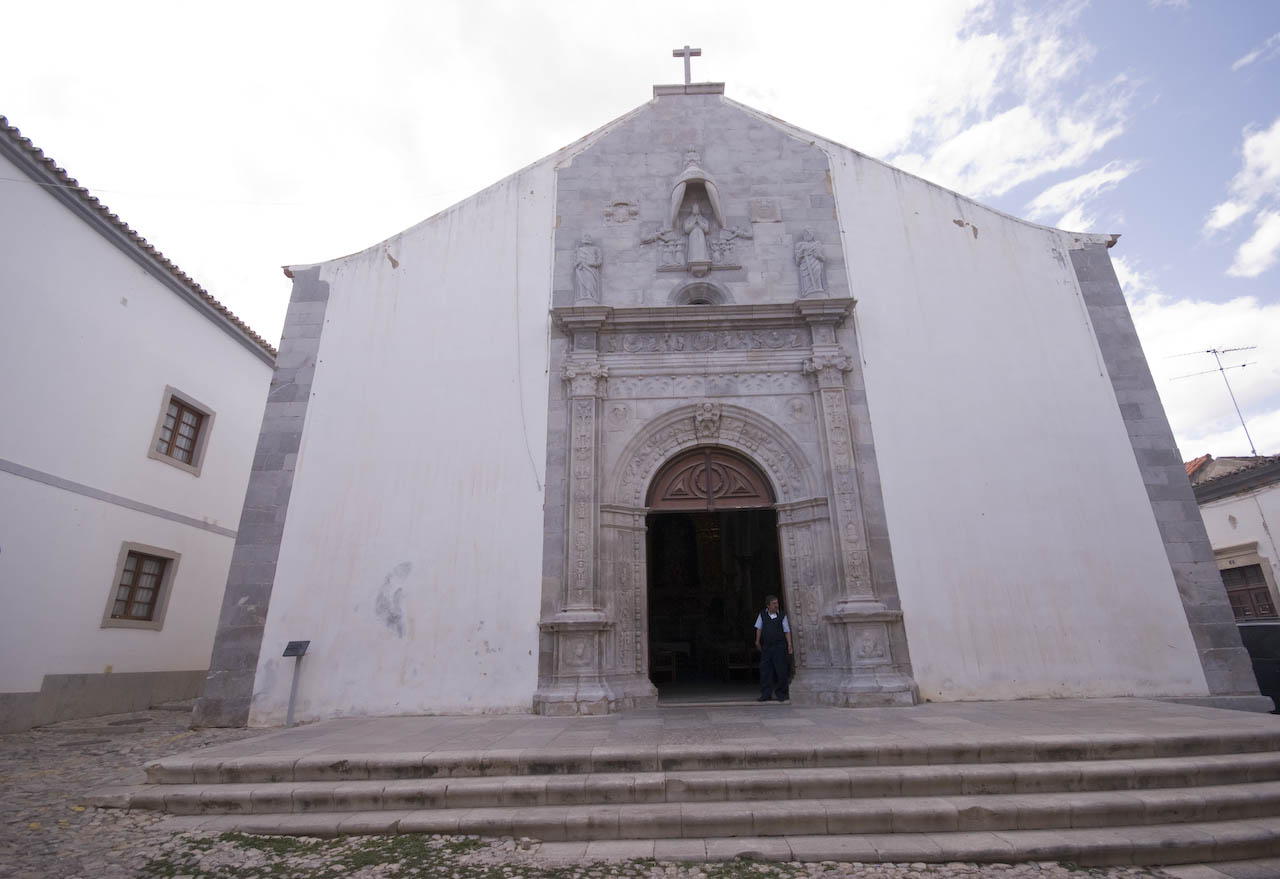

Igreja da Misericórdia de Tavira is a church in the Algarve region of Portugal. It is classified as a National Monument.

Tavira's Church of the Misericórdia (mercy of God, see Misericordia) is an integral part of the Building and Church of Santa Casa da Misericórdia de Tavira. It is at the heart of the civic parish (freguesa) of Tavira (Santa Maria and Santiago).

Commissioned by the Misericórdia de Tavira, (1541–1551) it was designed by André Pilarte, who had also been instrumental in the building of the Jerónimos Monastery, in Lisbon.

Since 1943, the church has been classified as a Property of Public Interest.

== History ==
Among all Renaissance buildings in the Algarve, this is one of the finest. It was constructed over a period of ten years from 1541.

== Decorated tiles ==
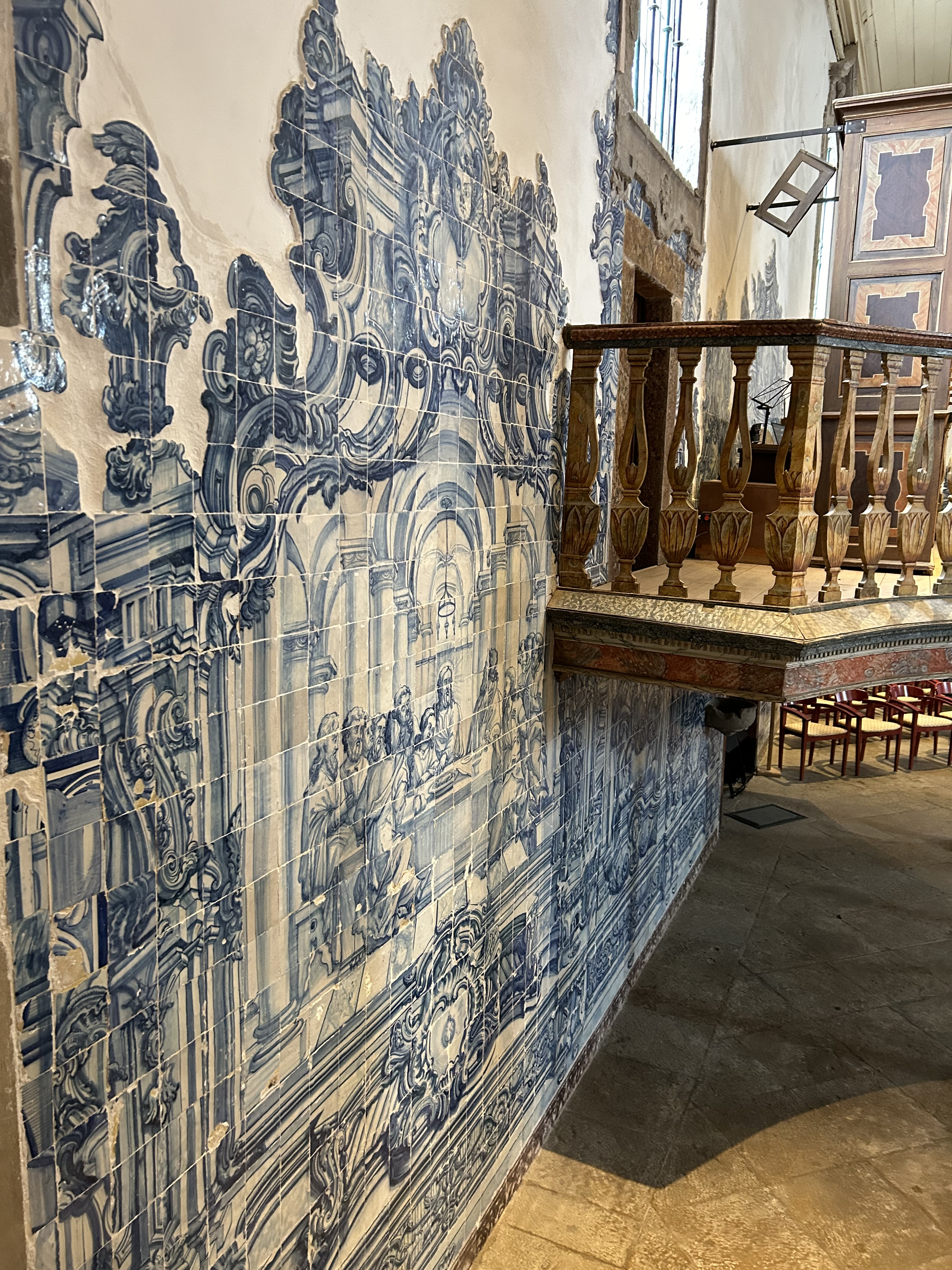
Wall tiles

Dating to 1750, the tile panels around the internal walls are generous in scale.

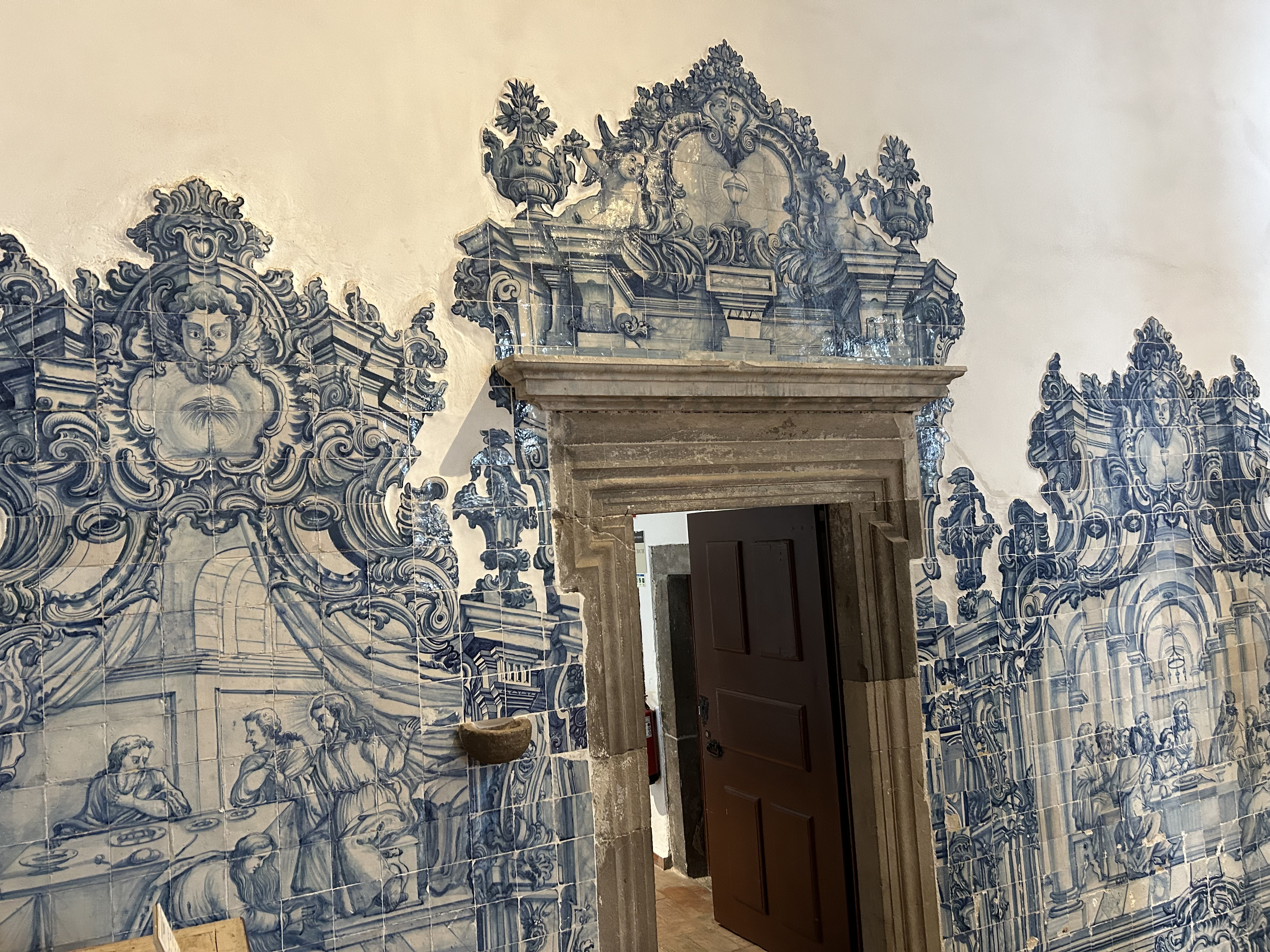
Wall tiles

Fourteen large frames depict the 14 Works of mercy. These are recognised in the Catholic Church as consisting of seven corporal acts of mercy (represented on the right-hand wall): To feed the hungry. To give water to the thirsty. To clothe the naked. To shelter the homeless. To visit the sick. To visit the imprisoned, or ransom the captive. To bury the dead. Shown on the left-hand wall are the seven spiritual works of mercy: To instruct the ignorant. To counsel the doubtful. To admonish the sinners. To bear patiently those who wrong us. To forgive offenses. To comfort the afflicted. To pray for the living and the dead.

== Architecture ==
The overall design is the work of André Pilate, a highly regarded architect in the Renaissance style. The building's Renaissance features can be seen in the main portal, decorated with motifs inspired by Italian engravings. The portal itself depicts Nossa Senhora da Misericórdia (Our Lady of Mercy), with Saint Peter and Saint Paul on either side of her. Here also can be seen the arms of the kingdom of Portugal and the city of Tavira. Inside the church are three naves with Renaissance capitals, meticulously embellished. The main retable was constructed in 1723, and reflects the Baroque style.
