= Gabbro, Rosignano Marittimo =

Gabbro
- Frazione
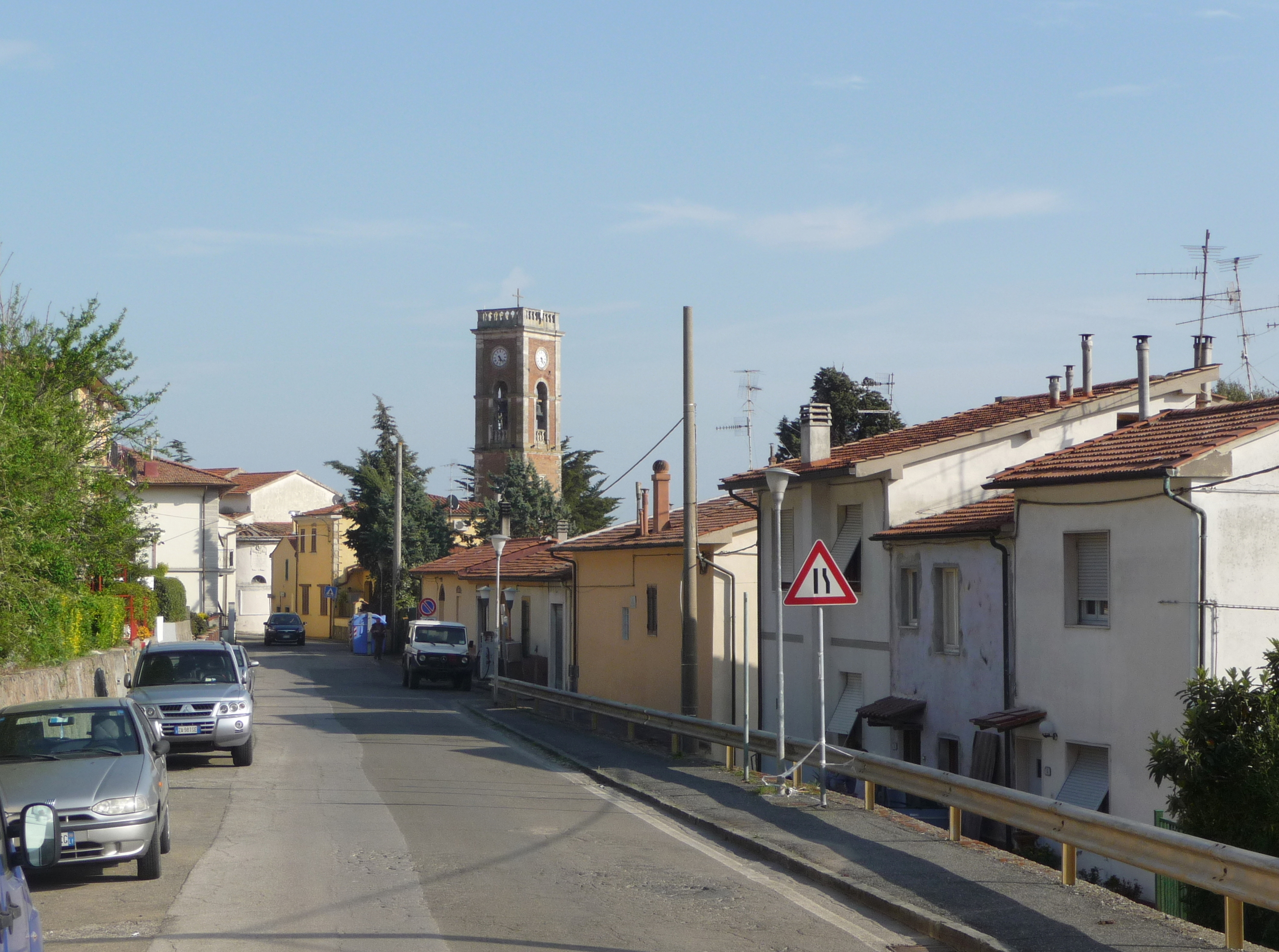

- Location of Gabbro in Italy
- Coordinates: 43°28′57″N 10°26′26″E
- Country: Italy
- Region: Tuscany
- Province: Livorno (LI)
- Comune: Rosignano Marittimo
- Elevation: 204 m (669 ft)

Population (2011)
  - Total: 898
- Time zone: UTC+1 (CET)
  - Summer (DST): UTC+2 (CEST)
- Postal code: 57016
- Dialing code: (+39) 0586

Gabbro is a village in Tuscany, central Italy, administratively a frazione of the comune of Rosignano Marittimo, province of Livorno. At the time of the 2011 census its population was 898.

The village is about 12 km (7 1/2 miles) from Livorno and 10 km (6 1/4 miles) from Rosignano Marittimo.

It gave its name to the type of rock known as gabbro.
