= WLVF-FM =

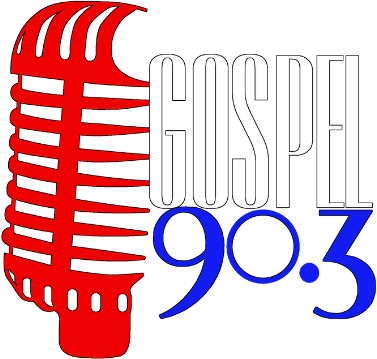
- Haines City, Florida; United States
- Broadcast area: Lakeland, Florida
- Frequency: 90.3 MHz (HD Radio)
- Branding: Gospel 90.3

Programming
- Format: Southern gospel
- Subchannels: HD2: Radio Landmark

Ownership
- Owner: Landmark Baptist Church; (Landmark Baptist Church, Inc.)

History
- First air date: April 11, 1986 (as WHGS)
- Former call signs: WHGS (1986–1990)
- Call sign meaning: Landmark Voice of Faith

Technical information
- Licensing authority: FCC
- Facility ID: 36500
- Class: A
- ERP: 750 watts
- HAAT: 96 meters (315 ft)
- Transmitter coordinates: 28°9′28″N 81°37′34″W

Links
- Public license information: Public file; LMS
- Webcast: Listen live; HD2: Listen live
- Website: www.gospel903.com

WLVF-FM (90.3 MHz) is a radio station broadcasting a southern gospel format. Licensed to Haines City, Florida, United States, the station is currently owned by the Landmark Baptist Church. The station utilizes HD Radio to digitally simulcast its FM programming, as well as its self-originating Radio Landmark station playing Spanish gospel music alongside teachings from the Reina Valera Gomez Bible.

== History ==
The station was assigned the call letters WHGS on February 12, 1986; it went on the air April 11, 1986. On August 1, 1990, the station changed its call sign to the current WLVF-FM.

WLVF-FM was previously simulcast on WLVF (930 AM), which relinquished its license and went off the air in 2011.

On January 9, 2025, WLVF-FM filed a digital notification with the Federal Communications Commission commencing its simulcast on HD Radio.

== Programs ==
In addition to live broadcasts of services at Landmark Baptist Church, the schedule includes reruns of Lester Roloff, Unshackled! produced by Pacific Garden Mission, and Canada's People's Gospel Hour with speaker Perry Rockwood.
