= Castiglioncello =

- Frazione
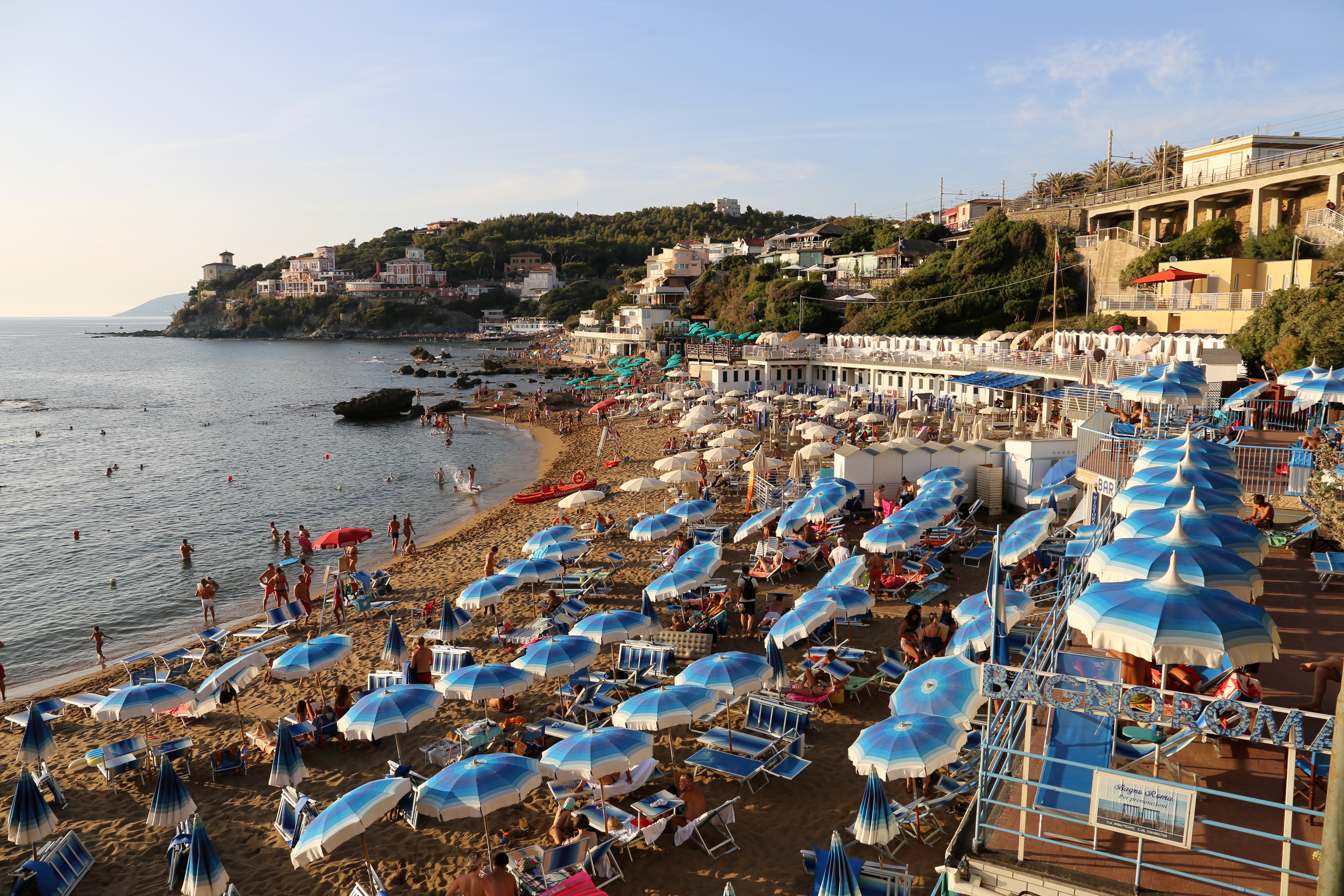
- View of Castiglioncello.

- Location of Castiglioncello in Italy
- Coordinates: 43°24′19.39″N 10°24′37.07″E
- Country: Italy
- Region: Tuscany
- Province: Livorno (LI)
- Comune: Rosignano Marittimo
- Elevation: 23 m (75 ft)

Population
  - Total: 3,800
- Demonym: Castiglioncellesi
- Time zone: UTC+1 (CET)
  - Summer (DST): UTC+2 (CEST)
- Postal code: 57016
- Dialing code: 0586
- Patron saint: Andrew the Apostle
- Website: Comune of Rosignano Marittimo Official website

Castiglioncello (formerly Castiglione Mondiglio) is a frazione of 3800 inhabitants of the comune of Rosignano Marittimo, in the province of Livorno, Tuscany, Italy.

Located in a privileged position from the panoramic point of view, away from major roads, has remained until modern times untouched, with its pine forests and cliffs close to the Ligurian Sea.

Castiglioncello has become famous in the sixties of last century as a vacation destination of important members of the world of cinema, such as Alberto Sordi, Guido Mannari and Marcello Mastroianni.

People who made their homes here also include Luigi Pirandello, Luchino Visconti and Vittorio Gassman.

Castiglioncello was also the set of the famous movie Il Sorpasso by Dino Risi, with Vittorio Gassman and Jean-Louis Trintignant.

== History ==
Village of poor fishermen to the extreme margins of the Etruria, it follows the fates of Volterra. Of the period of Etruscan power remains a testimony in the cinerary urn in alabaster, going back to the II century B.C., found just in the necropolis of Castiglioncello.

Already outpost of the Medici, Grand Dukes of Tuscany, that here in the XVII century made build a tower of sighting on the promontory, is a famous bathing locality since the half of the nineteenth century; moreover between its sheltered cale and the thick Mediterranean scrub found development of the current pictorial Macchiaioli, which is expressed through the works of Giovanni Fattori, Odoardo Borrani, Silvestro Lega, Telemaco Signorini, Giuseppe Abbati and many others, who used to vacation in Castiglioncello, often guests of the patron Diego Martelli, and whose paintings often portray the town and the surrounding hills.

At the end of the nineteenth century was built by Baron Fausto Lazzaro Patrone the Pasquini Castle, whose neo-medieval style then influenced the architecture of the nearby railway station, opened in 1910 along with the stretch of railway Vada-Livorno that improved the path on the Genoa-Rome line. The Baron built the castle on land belonging to Diego Martelli purchased at the same time as all his possessions, with the specific intent to create the center of one of the first seaside resorts in the late nineteenth century. He also realized the first "baths" in the form of real bathing establishment complete with every comfort, pursuing the dream of transforming the small town of Castiglioncello in a famous seaside resort.

The tourist fortune of Castiglioncello began in the second half of the nineteenth century, when struck by the mildness of the climate and the beauty of the landscape, Diego Martelli, art critic and patron, established his residence there. Here he invited continuously until the end of the century, almost all the painters, then became famous, the group of Macchiaioli giving rise to an artistic period as famous as the School of Castiglioncello.

Met is one of the most popular tourist destinations, known in Italy and abroad for its landscape, its services, and cultural initiatives and associations. Since 1992 Castiglioncello has obtained several times the attribution of the Blue Flag by the FEE, an acronym of Foundation for Environmental Education.

== Places of interest ==
- Castello Pasquini: the castle was built between 1889 and 1891 in a style similar to that used for the Florentine palaces of the Middle Ages.
- Chiesa dell'Immacolata Concezione: the construction of the church was begun in 1922. The dome dates from the years immediately following the World War II, when the building was restored following wartime damage.
- Oratorio di Sant'Andrea Apostolo (Chiesa di Sant'Andrea): The church stands on the ruins of a 17th-century oratory. The present structure dates from 1864.
- Torre di Castiglioncello: The tower dates back to the 17th century and was part of the system of sight of the coast of Livorno. It underwent some changes in the 1800s.
- National Archaeological Museum: set up at the beginning of the 20th century, it was closed around 1972-1973 but was reopened in 2001.
- Monte Pelato (Poggio Pelato): the highest hill in the town has many paths for hiking, and provides views of the Mediterranean, as well as the remains of mines for magnesite.

== Transports ==
- Castiglioncello railway station

== Photo gallery ==
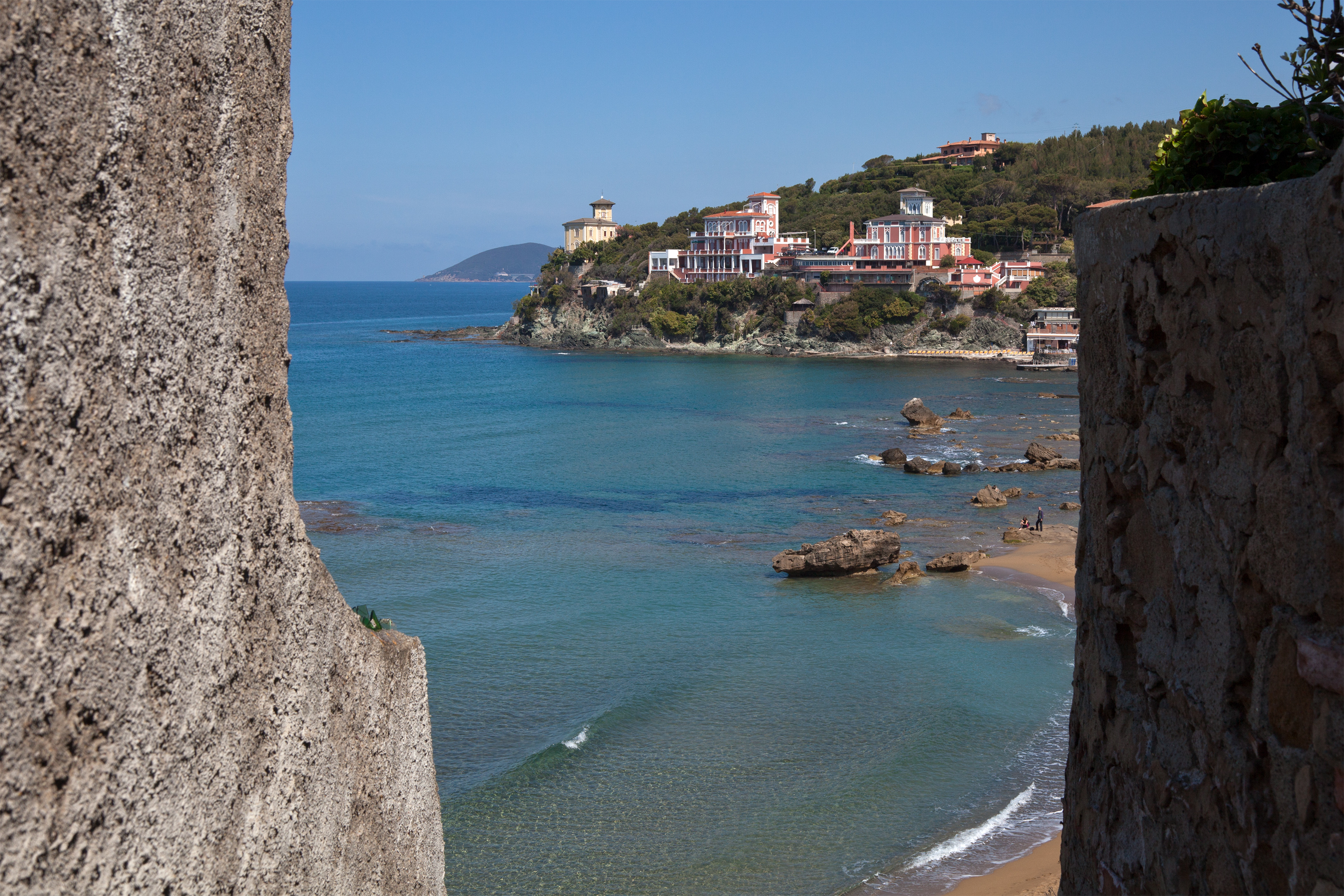
View from the staircase leading to the Quercetano Bay

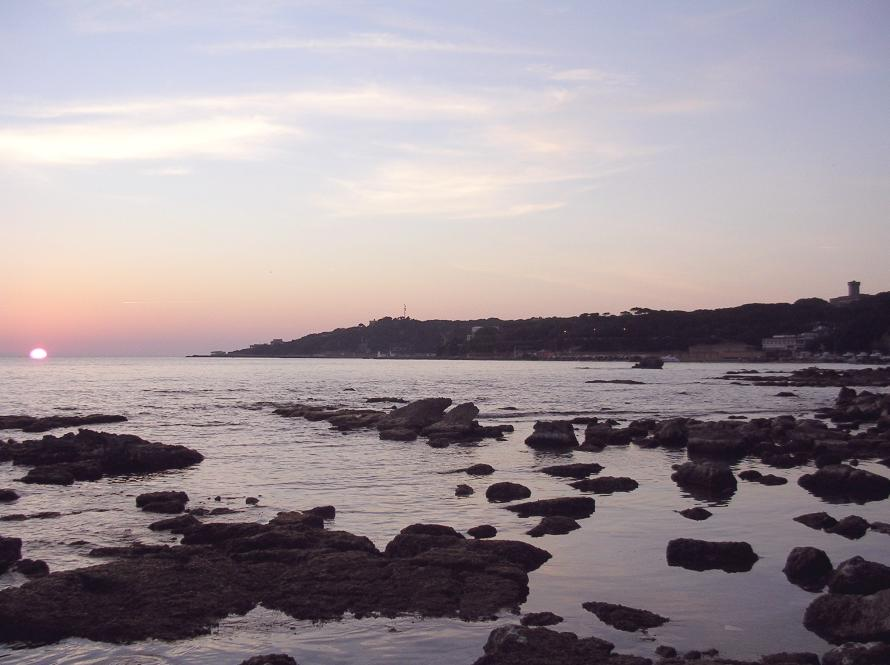
Castiglioncello at sunset

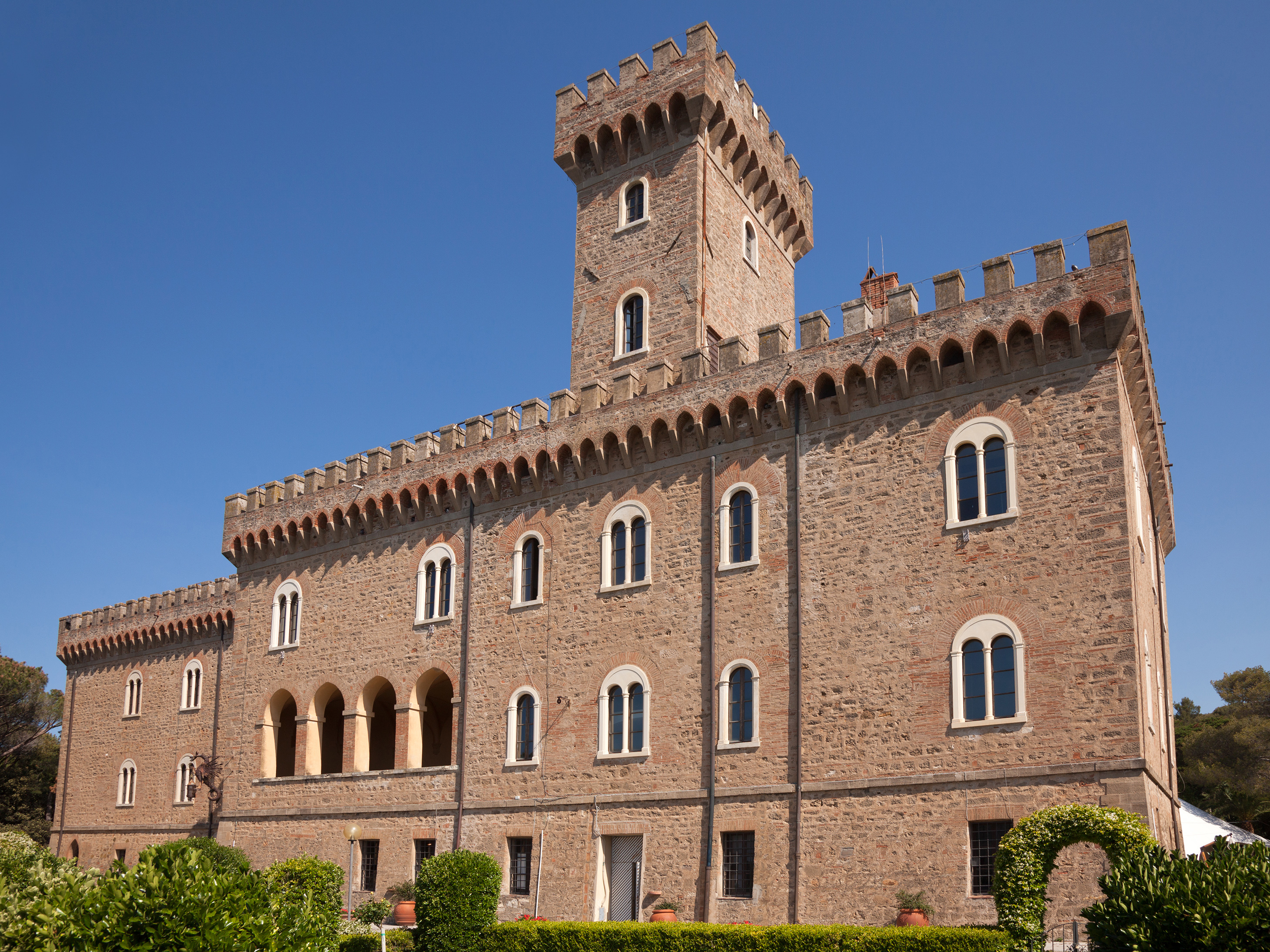
View of Castello Pasquini

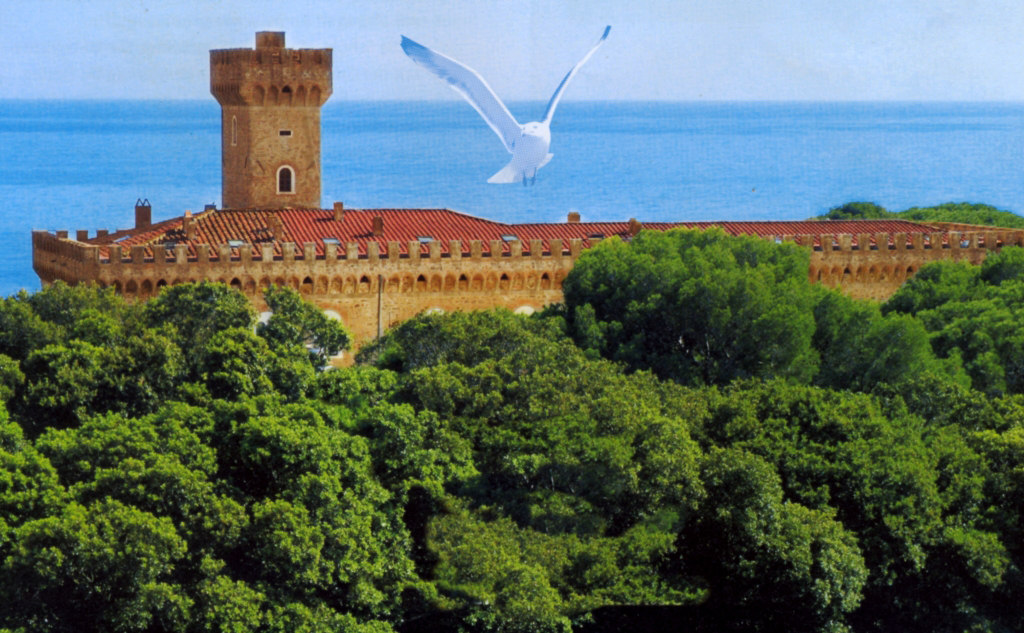
View from the Pasquini Castle looking towards the isle of Elba

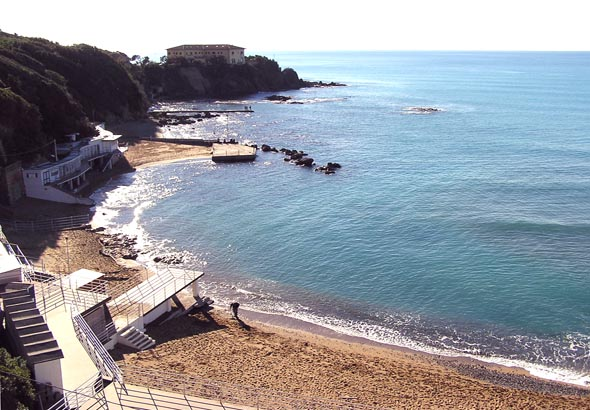
Winter view of the Quercetano Bay

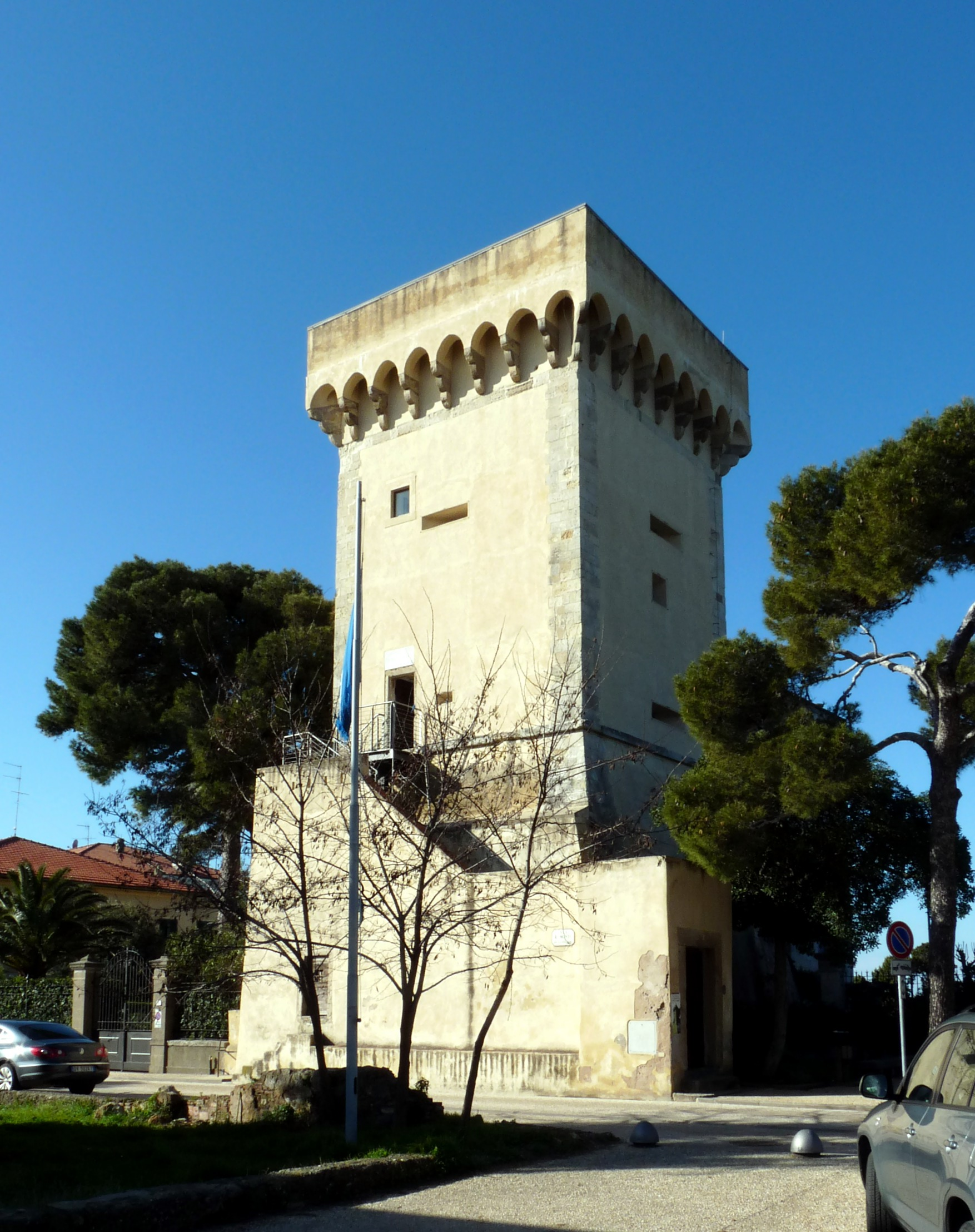
View of the tower of Castiglioncello
