= Misericorde =

Misericorde may refer to:

- Alternate spelling of misericord, a wooden shelf on the underside of a folding church seat
- Misericorde (weapon), a long, narrow knife used to dispatch wounded knights in medieval times
- Misericorde: Volume One, a 2023 visual novel video game

== See also ==
- Misericordia (disambiguation)
