= Vada Shoal Lighthouse =

Vada Shoal
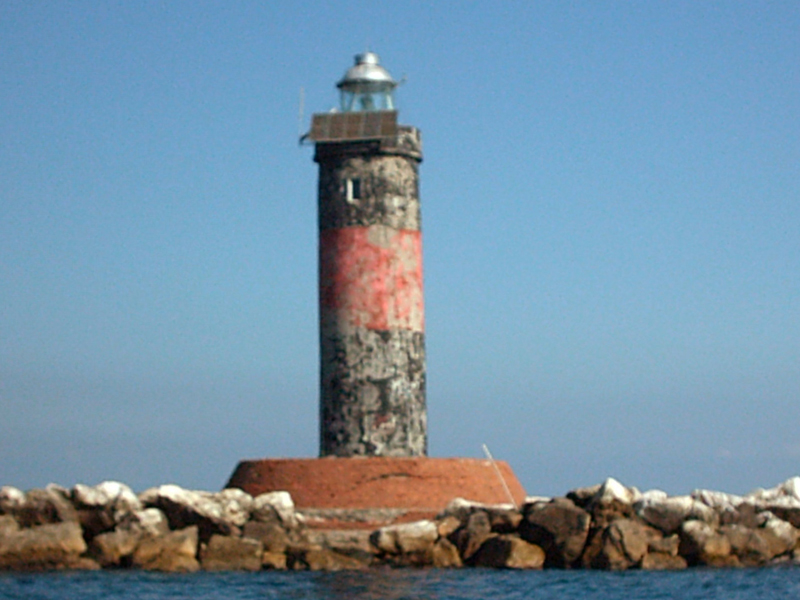
- Vada Shoal Lighthouse
- Location: Vada; Tuscany; Italy
- Coordinates: 43°19′13″N 10°21′49″E

Tower
- Constructed: 1868 (first)
- Foundation: concrete base
- Construction: masonry tower
- Height: 18 metres (59 ft)
- Shape: cylindrical tower with lantern
- Markings: black tower with a red central horizontal band, grey metallic lantern dome
- Power source: solar power
- Operator: Marina Militare

Light
- First lit: 1959 (current)
- Deactivated: 1959 (first)
- Focal height: 18 metres (59 ft)
- Lens: Type TD
- Intensity: LABI 100 W
- Range: main: 12 nautical miles (22 km; 14 mi)
- Characteristic: Fl (2) W 10s.
- Italy no.: 1975 E.F

Vada Shoal Lighthouse (Italian: Faro delle Secche di Vada) is an active lighthouse, located circa 4 nautical miles (7.4 km; 4.6 mi) off Vada on the Ligurian Sea, in order to signal the presence of the shoals. The Lighthouse belongs to the municipal area of Rosignano Marittimo.

== Description ==
The lighthouse, built in 1868, reconstructed in 1959 and restored in 2008, consists of a cylindrical masonry tower, 18 metres (59 ft) high, painted black with a red central horizontal band. The tower, settled on a wide concrete jetty encircled by riprap, has the lantern on the top, with a dome painted metallic grey.

The light is positioned at 18 metres (59 ft) above sea level and emits two white flashes in a 10-second period, visible up to a distance of 12 nautical miles (22 km; 14 mi). The lighthouse is completely automated, powered by a solar unit, and is managed by the Marina Militare with the identification code number 1975 E.F.

== See also ==
- List of lighthouses in Italy
