= Alberto Mastromarino =

Italian operatic singer (1963–2025)

- Born: November 20, 1963; Castelnuovo della Misericordia, Tuscany, Italy
- Died: May 4, 2025 (aged 61); Cecina, Tuscany, Italy
- Occupation: Operatic baritone

Alberto Mastromarino (November 20, 1963 – May 4, 2025) was an Italian operatic baritone. Born in Tuscany and trained by Paolo Silveri, he began his career at Teatro Eliseo in Rome in 1987. He performed leading roles in operas by Giuseppe Verdi in Italy, and also internationally at the Opéra de Monte-Carlo in Monaco as well as in Los Angeles, New York City and Palm Beach in the United States, and other venues in Beijing and Cairo. He died on May 4, 2025, at age 61.
