= Nibbiaia =

- Frazione
- Location of Nibbiaia in Italy
- Coordinates: 43°27′52″N 10°24′58″E
- Country: Italy
- Region: Tuscany
- Province: Livorno (LI)
- Comune: Rosignano Marittimo
- Elevation: 275 m (902 ft)

Population (2011)
  - Total: 690
- Time zone: UTC+1 (CET)
  - Summer (DST): UTC+2 (CEST)
- Postal code: 57016
- Dialing code: (+39) 0586

Nibbiaia is a village in Tuscany, central Italy, administratively a frazione of the comune of Rosignano Marittimo, province of Livorno. At the time of the 2011 census its population was 690.

The village is about 20 km from Livorno and 10 km from Rosignano Marittimo.
