= Spanish traditional Christian music =

- Stylistic origins: Christian music, Rondalla music
- Cultural origins: Late 20th century Mexico and United States
- Typical instruments: Vocals, piano, organ, guitar, violin

Spanish traditional Christian music refers to Spanish-language Christian music that is usually accompanied by traditional instruments such as the piano, organ, violin, or guitar. Christian or Baptist rondallas are normally the interpreters of this kind of music, though soloists, duos, trios, and groups sing it also. This kind of music is generally released through Compact Cassettes and Compact Discs from Baptist churches or from other Christian music institutions. Spanish Traditional Christian music has been made popular in both Mexico and the United States and it has been recently distributed through iTunes also.

== List of artists ==
=== Soloists ===
- Cathy Flores
- Claudia Sánchez
- Pastor Hernán Cortés
- Alexis Peña
- Pastor José Flores
- Maricruz Barrios
- Maura Ochoa
- Mike Allison
- Sergio Ramírez

=== Duos ===
- Dueto Salazar
- La Familia Reyes
- Oscar y Flory Olivares

=== Trios ===
- Because of Love Trio

=== Groups ===
- Ríos de Misericordia
- Rondalla Cristiana Sinaí
- Rondalla Cristiana Tabernáculo
- Rondalla Bautista de Sión
- Rondalla Bautista La Gran Comisión
- Rondalla Faro Encendido
- Rondalla Jerusalén
