= La Mazzanta =

- Frazione
- Location of La Mazzanta in Italy
- Coordinates: 43°19′31″N 10°27′45″E
- Country: Italy
- Region: Tuscany
- Province: Livorno (LI)
- Comune: Rosignano Marittimo
- Elevation: 2 m (6.6 ft)

Population (2011)
  - Total: 214
- Time zone: UTC+1 (CET)
  - Summer (DST): UTC+2 (CEST)
- Postal code: 57016
- Dialing code: (+39) 0586

La Mazzanta is a resort town in Tuscany, central Italy, in the comune of Rosignano Marittimo, province of Livorno. At the time of the 2001 census its population was 148.

The town is about 30 km from Livorno and 12 km from Rosignano Marittimo.

== Bibliography ==
- S. Mordhorst (1996). Guida alla Val di Cecina. Siena.
