= Rosignano Solvay =

Borough of Rosignano Marittimo, Tuscany, Italy

- Frazione
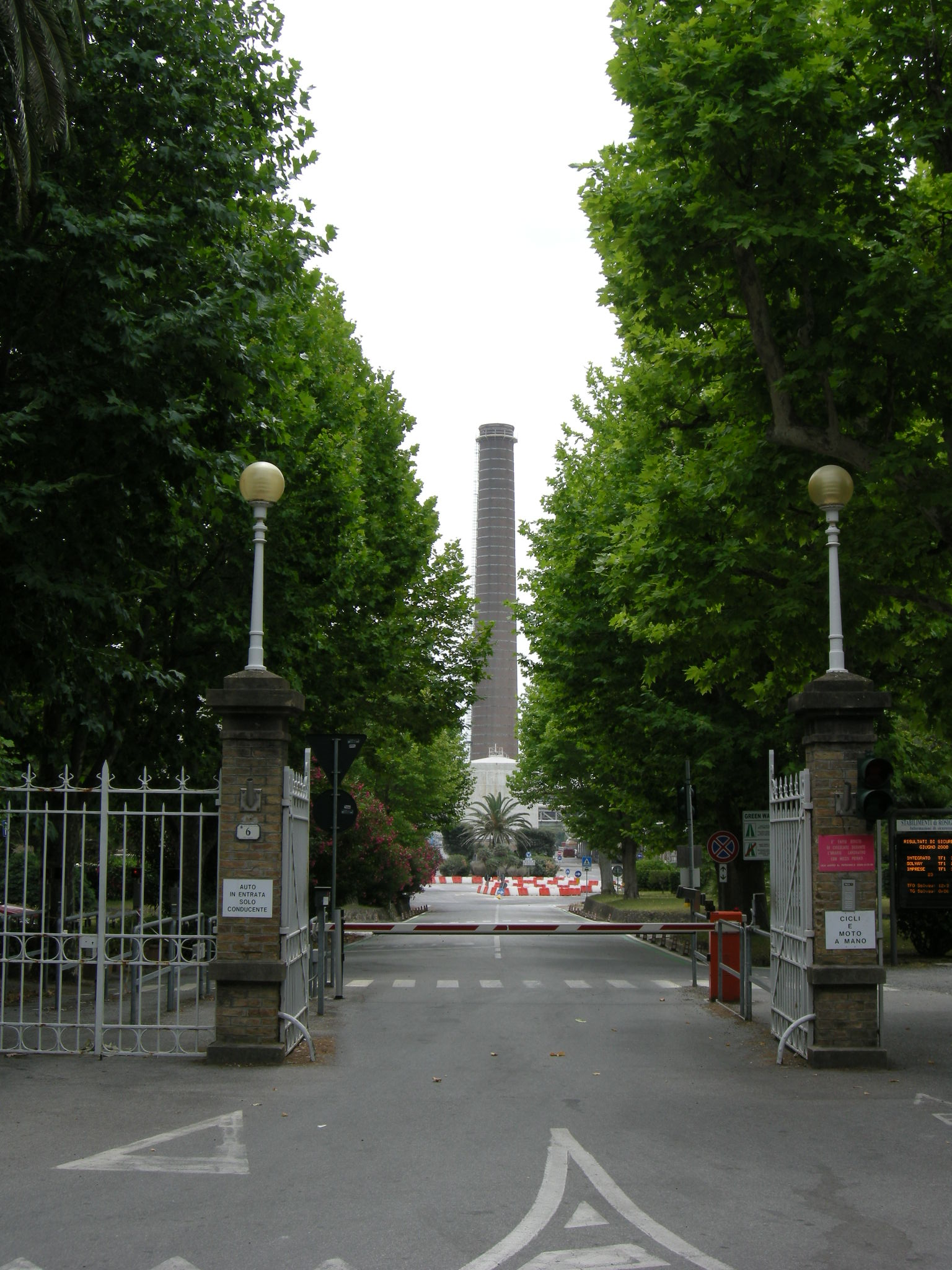
- Entrance to the Solvay factory

- Location of Rosignano Solvay in Italy
- Coordinates: 43.3833°N 10.4333°E
- Country: Italy
- Region: Tuscany
- Province: Livorno (LI)
- Comune: Rosignano Marittimo
- Elevation: 10 m (33 ft)

Population (2002)
  - Total: 15,802
- Time zone: UTC+1 (CET)
  - Summer (DST): UTC+2 (CEST)
- Postal code: 57016
- Dialing code: (+39) 0586

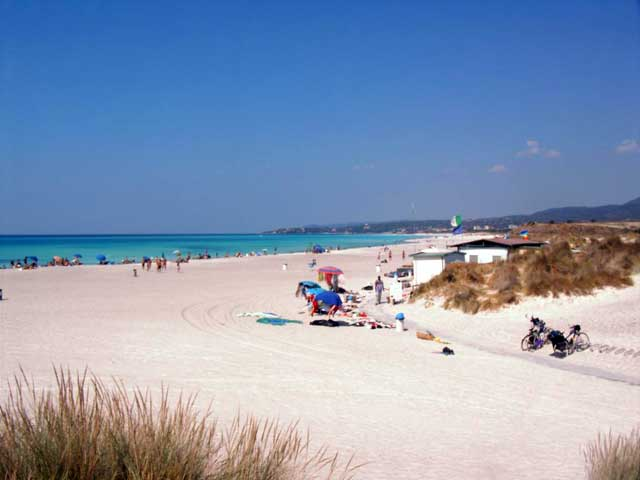
View of the White Beaches.

Rosignano Solvay is a frazione (detached borough) of Rosignano Marittimo, Tuscany, Italy, located some 25 km from Livorno.

It houses the White Beaches (Italian: Spiagge bianche), whose sand is formed by limestone (calcium carbonate) (90%) and calcium sulfate (10%) due the soda ash production of the nearby Solvay since 1914.

Sights include the Teatro Solvay, two Etruscan museums and the Villaggio Solvay residential complex.

== Solvay Chemical Endangerment of Beaches and Mediterranean Sea ==
Bloomberg Businessweek has produce an exposé profiling history of chemical deposits in the region by Solvay that has profoundly affected the beaches and local population. The impact on the local environment is visible from space as seen on Google Maps Solvay claim there are no problematic consequences. Watch the exposé: https://www.youtube.com/watch?v=fkZZOYeKr7o

Another exposé by France24 interviews local residents directly affected by the chemical dump. Watch the exposé: https://www.france24.com/en/tv-shows/reporters/20230505-italy-s-toxic-paradise-the-beaches-of-rosignano-solvay

The Financial Times published an article outlining the environmental (ESG) pollution caused by Solvay Link: https://www.ft.com/content/fb129666-dc85-48ff-a9c8-3bfa87a715ca

Solvay website claims that the effluents contain natural limestone as well as other inert, suspended solids such as gypsum, sand and clay.

== United Nations Report ==
According to a report published in 1999 by the United Nations Environment Programme, the Spiagge Bianche has been among the 15 most polluted coastal sites on the Mediterranean Sea. Hotspots are evaluated based on the impact of the civil and industrial discharges regarding the quality of the local seawater, drinking water, recreational activities, the economy and social welfare.

A further special report by Special Rapporteur on the implications for human rights of the environmentally sound management and disposal of hazardous substances and wastes was submitted on 13 July 2022

In 2016 a study was conducted on the mortality rate compared to the regional average for the same period; The study concludes shows an excess of mortality for chronic-degenerative diseases in the area but concludes that it is not possible to establish a causal link between environmental pollution and an increase in mortality.

== Ongoing Legal Challenge ==
Italy's prosecutors investigate ex-minister over Solvay plant licence -sources (Reuters)
