= Vada, Rosignano Marittimo =

Vada
- Frazione
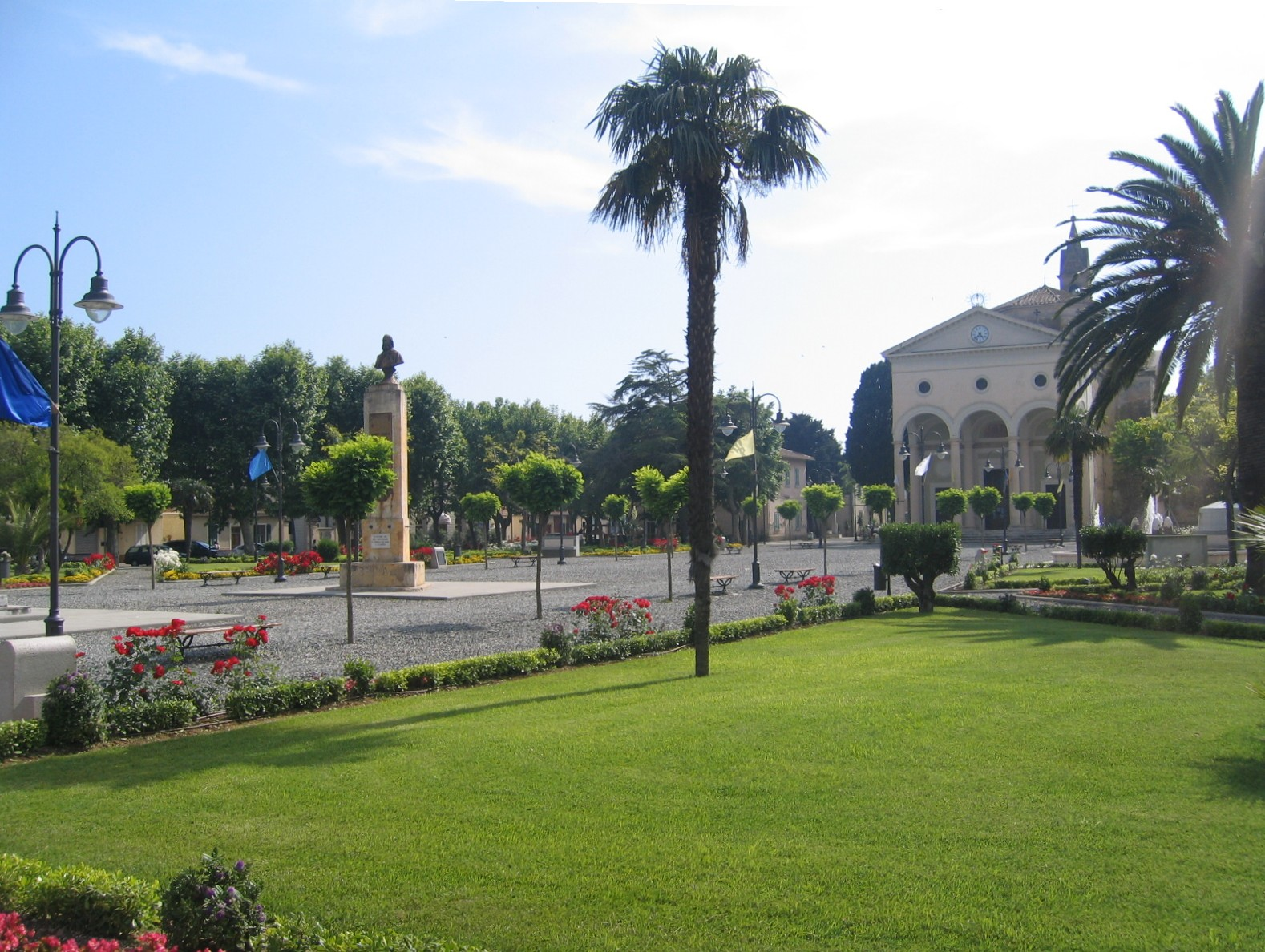

- Location of Vada in Italy
- Coordinates: 43°21′6″N 10°27′21″E
- Country: Italy
- Region: Tuscany
- Province: Livorno (LI)
- Comune: Rosignano Marittimo
- Elevation: 3 m (9.8 ft)

Population (2024)
  - Total: 7,489
- Time zone: UTC+1 (CET)
  - Summer (DST): UTC+2 (CEST)
- Postal code: 57016
- Dialing code: (+39) 0586

Vada is a town in Tuscany, central Italy, administratively a frazione of the comune of Rosignano Marittimo, province of Livorno. At the time of the 2011 census its population was 3,461.

The town is about 25 km from Livorno and 8 km from Rosignano Marittimo.

== Bibliography ==
- S. Mordhorst (1996). Guida alla Val di Cecina. Siena.
