= Diego Martelli =

Italian art critic (1839–1896)

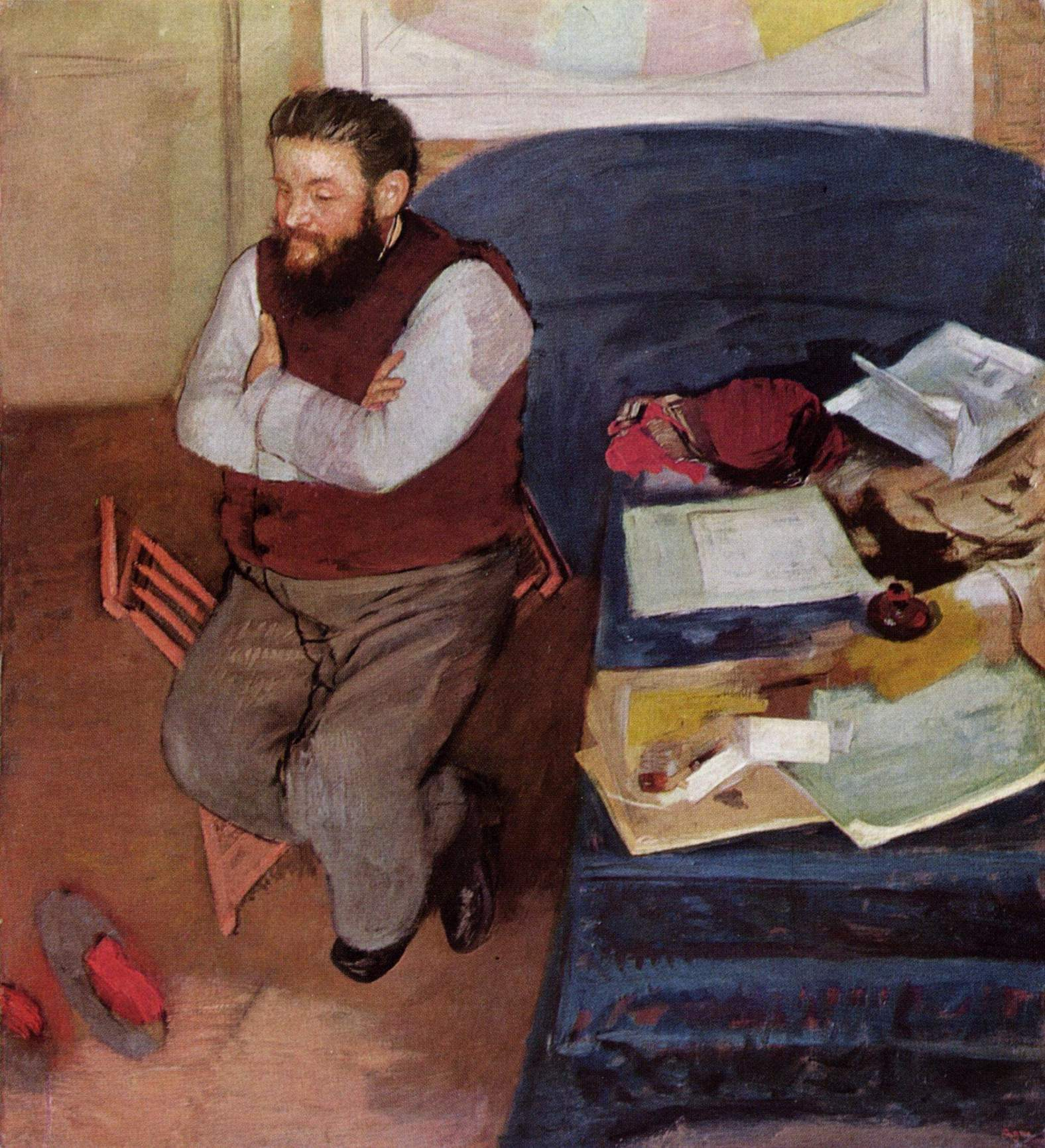
Portrait of Diego Martelli by Edgar Degas, 1879, oil on canvas, Scottish National Gallery

Diego Martelli (October 29, 1839 – November 20, 1896) was an Italian art critic who was one of the first supporters of Impressionism in Italy. He was a defender and associate of the Tuscan artists the Macchiaioli, whom he often hosted at his estate in Castiglioncello.

== Biography ==
Martelli was born in Florence, the son of a road engineer. He studied natural sciences at the University of Pisa. In 1855, while still in his teens, he became acquainted with the group of artists who frequented the Caffè Michelangiolo in Florence who would become known as the Macchiaioli. In 1859 Martelli fought in the Second Italian War of Independence.

In 1861 he inherited a large estate around Castiglioncello on a hill overlooking a cliff. Castiglioncello at the time was a small village of fishermen and farmers, as evidenced in the numerous paintings of the movement. Martelli's home there became a haven where his artist friends could work from nature, and he became an advocate and theoretician of the Macchiaioli.

His writing on art in the 1860s championed the realism of artists such as Courbet and the Barbizon School. In 1862–63 he made his first visit to Paris, where he attended the Salon des Refuses. He encountered the work of Manet, which he disparaged as "ugly" and "ostentatious". He traveled to Paris again in 1869. During his third trip to the French capital in 1870 he attended lectures on organic chemistry by Michel Eugène Chevreul, whose color theories were of great interest to Martelli.

With Adriano Cecioni and Telemaco Signorini he founded the journal Gazzettino delle arti del disegno in 1867, and in 1873 he initiated the art journal Giornale artistico.

In the mid-1870s, letters he received from his friend Federico Zandomeneghi, who had relocated to Paris in 1874, stimulated Martelli's curiosity about the Impressionists. His fourth and longest sojourn in Paris was from April 1878 to April 1879. The articles he wrote for various Italian journals during his stay reveal his developing interest in the formal and optical qualities of Impressionism, which supplanted his earlier enthusiasm for art that emphasized rural values and social concerns as exemplified by Millet.

He spent time with Manet, and with Degas who painted two portraits of him in 1879. Martelli's closest friendship among the Impressionists was with Pissarro who, at Martelli's urging, exhibited two of his paintings in the Florence Promotrice of 1879. That they were poorly received, even by the Macchiaioli, was a disappointment to Martelli.

Martelli continued to champion new art. In a lecture he delivered in Venice in 1895, he praised the Neo-Impressionists, who "on the basis of the theories of light and color combinations, scientifically explained by the chemist Chevreul, ... carry out experiments that today are ridiculed but that will probably be the triumphs of tomorrow."

Martelli died in Florence on November 20, 1896. He left a collection of art to the city of Florence.
