= WLVF (AM) =

- Haines City, Florida; United States
- Frequency: 930 kHz

Programming
- Format: Southern gospel

Ownership
- Owner: Landmark Baptist Church; (Landmark Baptist Church, Inc.)

History
- First air date: September 9, 1960 (as WHAN)
- Last air date: August 30, 2010
- Former call signs: WHAN (1960–1979); WFXI (1979–1984); WTHN (1984–1986)

Technical information
- Facility ID: 36501
- Class: D
- Power: 500 watts day; 13 watts night
- Transmitter coordinates: 28°4′52″N 81°38′23″W

Links
- Website: www.gospel903.com

WLVF (930 AM) was a radio station broadcasting a southern gospel format. Licensed to Haines City, Florida, United States, the station was owned by Landmark Baptist Church. During its final years, the station served as a simulcast of its sister station, WLVF-FM, which continues to broadcast the southern gospel format.

== History ==
The station went on the air as WHAN on September 9, 1960. It then became WFXI on February 9, 1979. On July 23, 1984, the station changed its call sign to WTHN; on March 26, 1986, the station changed to WLVF. WLVF went silent August 30, 2010 after losing its transmitter site; after determining that there were no sites available to return the station to the air, Landmark Baptist Church turned in the license for WLVF on May 18, 2011. The license was cancelled on June 7, 2011.
