= Banner of Misericordia =

1900 religious work by Antoni Gaudí

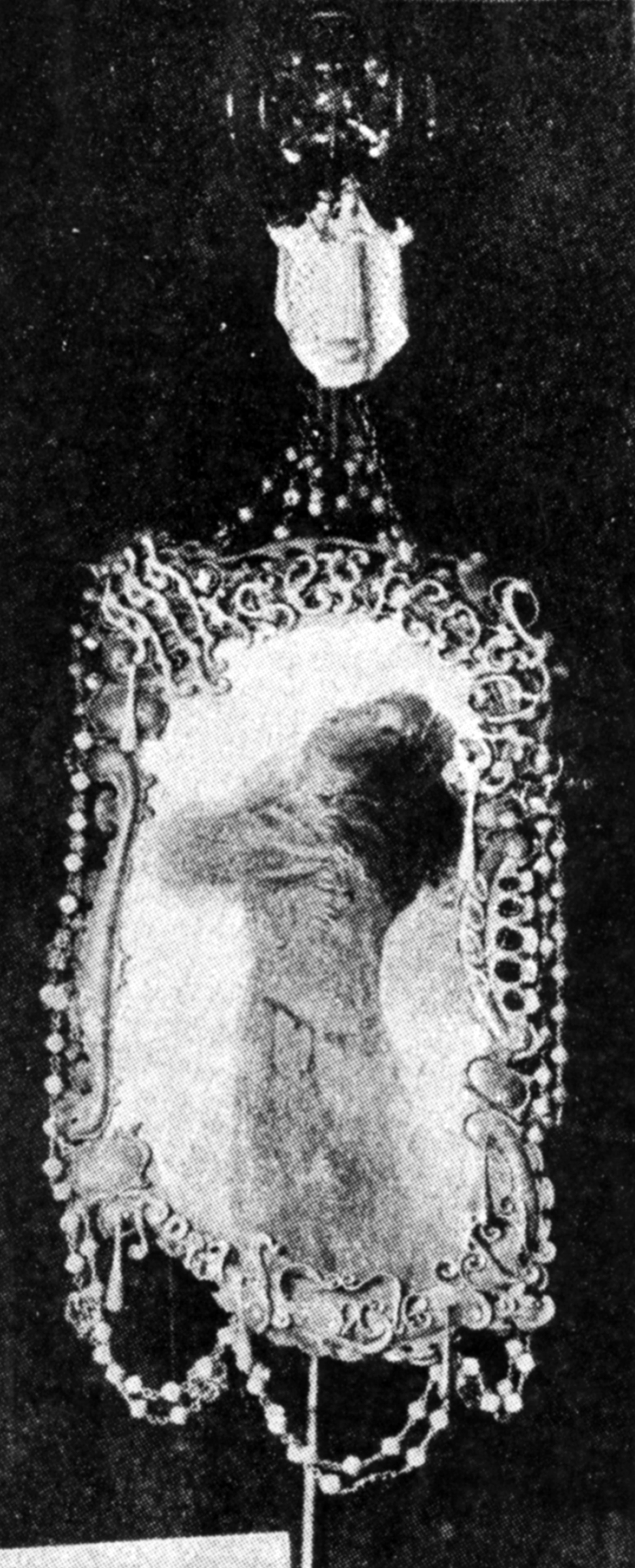
Photograph of the front face of the banner (J. M. Constantí, Semanario Católico de Reus, July 21, 1900).

The banner of Misericordia (Mercy) is a work of the Catalan architect Antoni Gaudí projected for the procession to the Sanctuary of Misericordia in Reus of the Reusians residing in Barcelona as one of the acts for the 1900 Holy Year. It is known by the two front and back photographs published in the Semanario Católico de Reus (Reus Catholic Weekly magazine) in July of that year. It included another photograph of the procession in which Gaudí is seen as part of a large group of pilgrims and the banner being carried by one of them.

A previous issue of the same publication contains a description with references to the materials with which it was built. The banner remained in the sanctuary until July 1936, when it was destroyed in the events of the Spanish Civil War.

Between 2003 and 2007 a project was carried to construct a replica based on the detailed study of the photographs, using the same materials and the same techniques as the original. The replica is currently exhibited in the crypt of the Sagrada Família Temple in Barcelona.

== Description ==
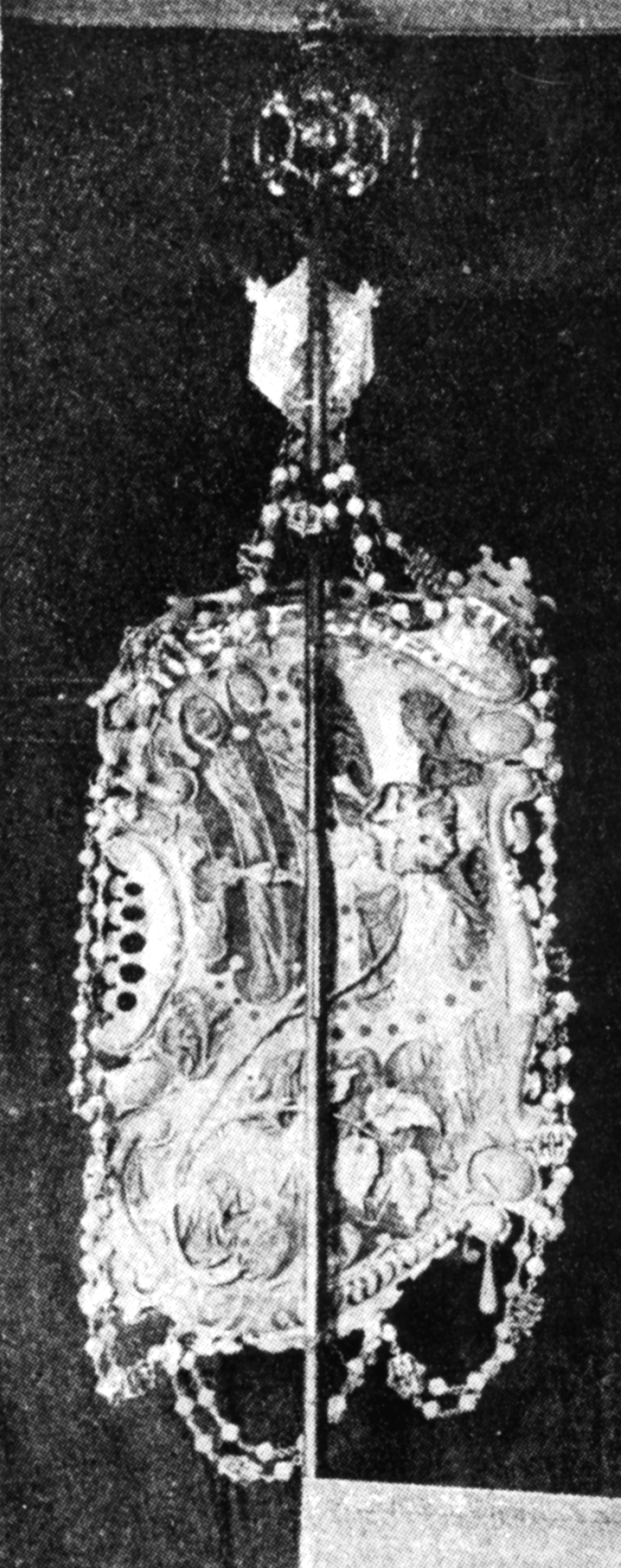
Photograph of the back side of the banner (J. M. Constantí, Catholic Seminary of Reus, July 21, 1900).

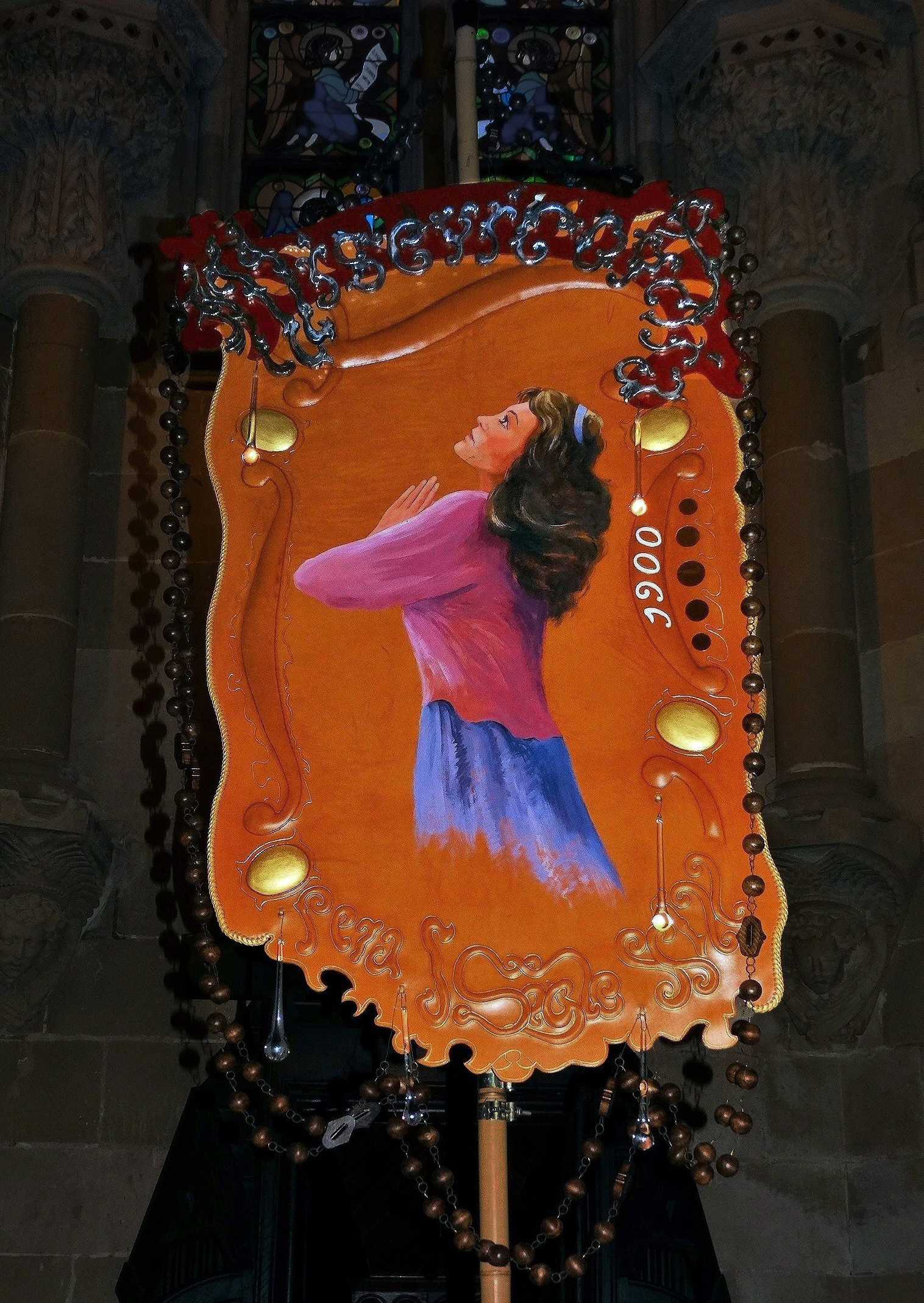
Replica of the Gaudí banner that is displayed in the crypt of the Temple of the Sagrada Familia in Barcelona. Frontal (Photo: Edith Sciortino).

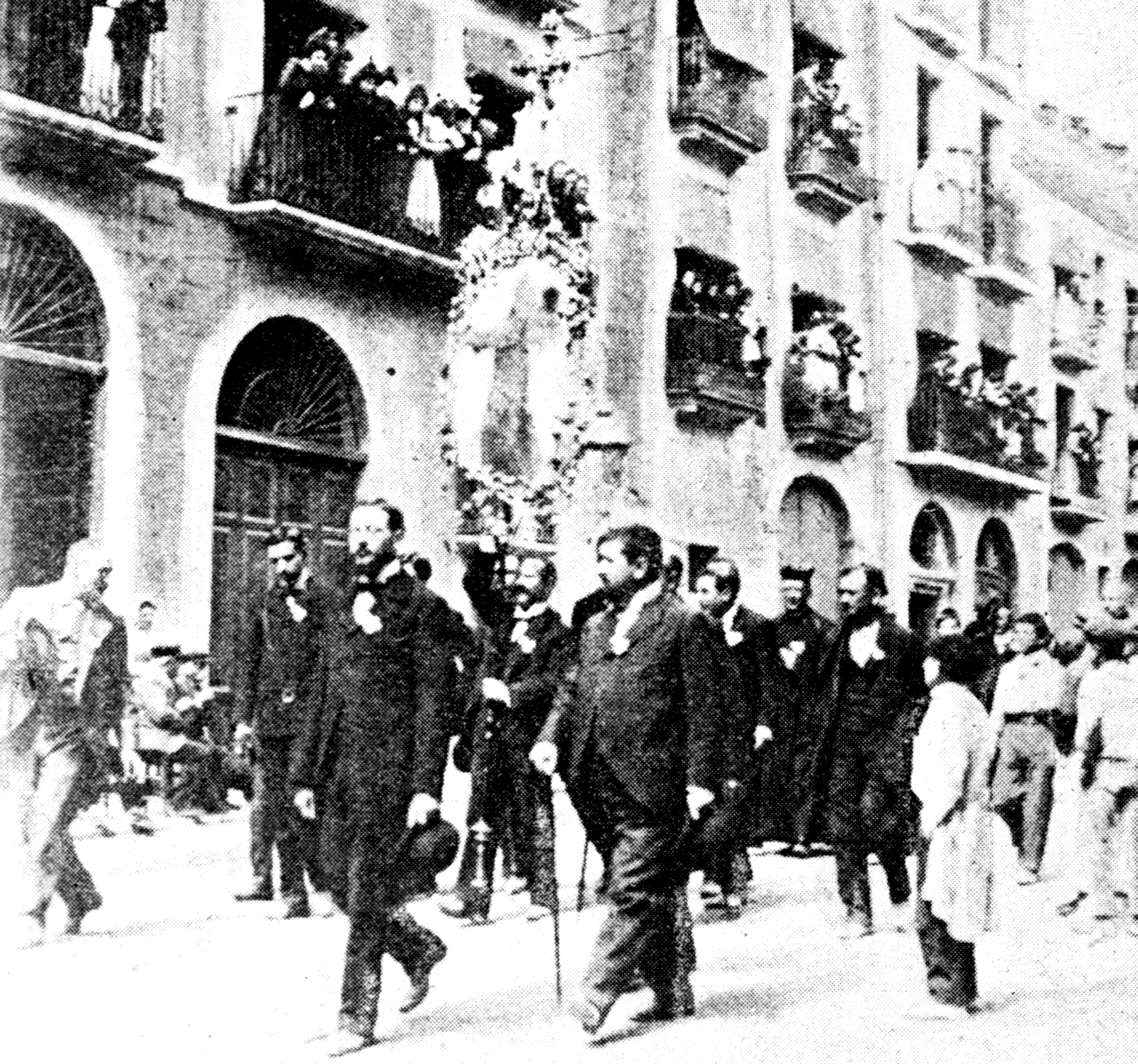
Photograph of the procession of the reusenses resident in Barcelona to the Sanctuary of the Misericordia of Reus in 1900. On the left of the photo Gaudí is seen. (A. Anguera, Catholic Seminary of Reus, July 21st, 1900).

The standard, as described in the Semanario Católico de Reus article of April 1900 and according to what can be observed in the fuzzy photographs, consisted of a flag of embossed and holey leather of approximately trapeze shape in a vertical direction formed by front and back.

The first one was painted with the image in prayer of the shepherdess Isabel Besora, who according to tradition had the vision of the Virgin Mary. The painting was by Aleix Clapés, painter friend of Gaudí that resided in Reus, who also collaborated with him in the Palau Güell and in the Casa Milà. The back face had the shield of Barcelona painted in gold and silver in very stylized form and superimposed the rose representing Reus, made in bossed platinum. Topping the bamboo stick with metallic applications was the image of the Virgin of Misericordia (Mercy) with spread mantle and flanked by angels, all in polychrome aluminium. Over this image it was the cross and the name of Jesus. On both sides were inscriptions: on the front the word "Misericordia" in the upper, and lower "Per al segle XIX" (in Catalan "For the 19th century") made with letters of carved and bossed aluminium, and painted "1900" In reference to the Holy Year. The back face was painted on the sides with the words "Barcelona" and "Reus", above again "Misericordia" and below the phrase "Per a nantrus" ("For us" in Catalan according to the Tarraconian speech). The whole set was wrapped in a rosary made with beads of aluminium and bronze. The internal structure that strengthened the flag and attached it to the mast was made of aluminium too.

All the materials were very light to facilitate the transport of the standard during the procession. The metal parts could have been made by the cousin of the architect, Jose Gaudí Pomerol, who had a workshop in the neighborhood of Sant Pere in Barcelona.

== Symbolism ==
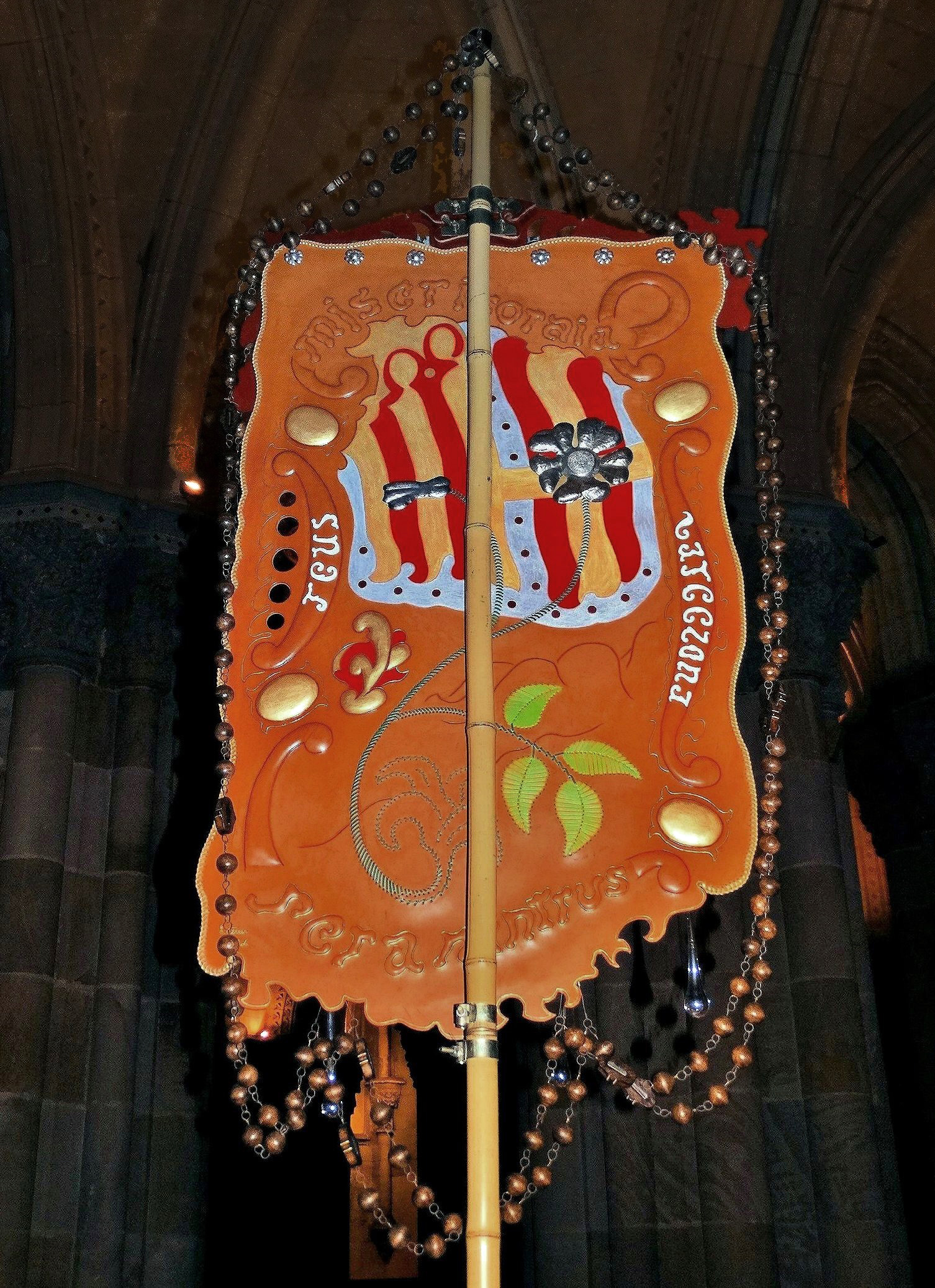
Replica of the Gaudí banner that is displayed in the crypt of the Temple of the Sagrada Familia in Barcelona . Rear (Photo: Edith Sciortino).

The banner symbolized the appearance of the Virgin to the shepherdess in 1592, after praying when a serious epidemic lashed the city. The tradition tells that the Virgin indicated her that a candle had to be lit on the altar of the church so long that the flame could turn the walls of the city in a procession, and thus the evil would end. All the elements in the banner express this dedication: the painting of the girl kneeling in prayer, the rose as the sign that according to the tale left the Virgin on the cheek of the young woman to give credibility to the apparition, which finally became the symbol of the city, or the rosary that envelops the banner. There are also direct references to the brotherhood between the cities of Barcelona and Reus through the representation of the amalgamated shields. As a resume it is a tribute to the patroness of Reus with prayers and invocations, and to the Holy Year of 1900.

== Other works of Gaudi in Reus ==
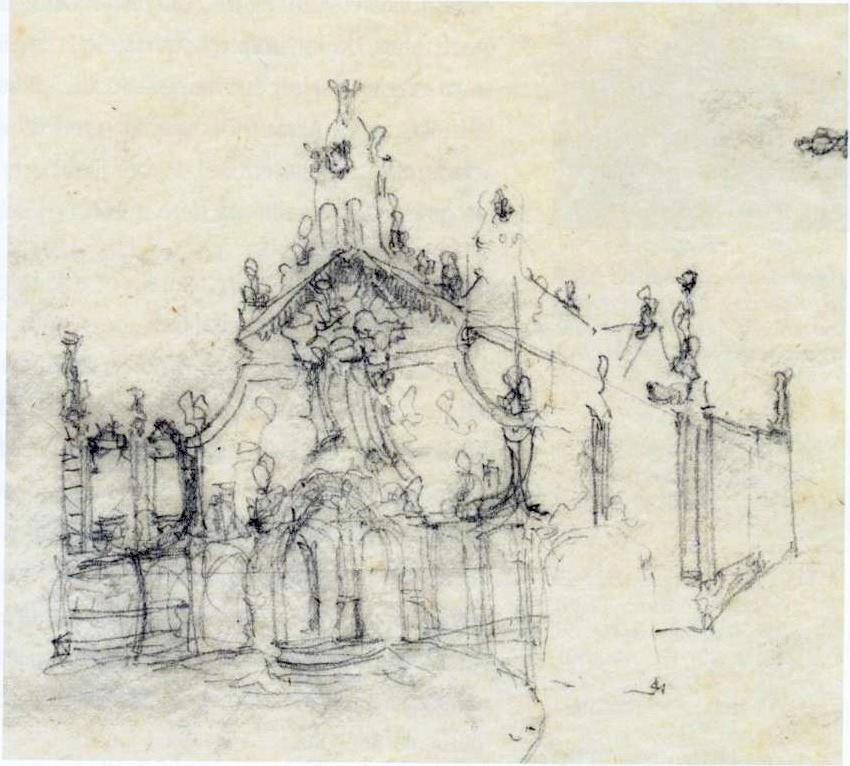
Gaudi sketch for the reform of the Sanctuary of Mercy. . (Museu Comarcal de Reus)

Despite being very possibly his birthplace, Reus does not preserve works of Gaudí, who would be one of its most illustrious sons. Although the architect presented a project of restoration and reform of the façade of the sanctuary of Misericordia as from the fervor awakened by the procession of 1900 and the ceremony of canonical coronation in 1904. This building of the 17th century was erected in the place where tradition places the appearance of the Virgin to Isabel Besora. However, for reasons not fully clarified, apparently by litigation with neighbours, the project was left out. Finally, the municipal architect began the work in 1915, although only the basement was made. In the Museu Comarcal de Reus (Reus regional museum) remain two sketches that Gaudí made of his project. In them they can be seen a baroque facade according to contemporary works such as Casa Calvet, and the treatment of the environment that included a monumental rosary along the access avenue.

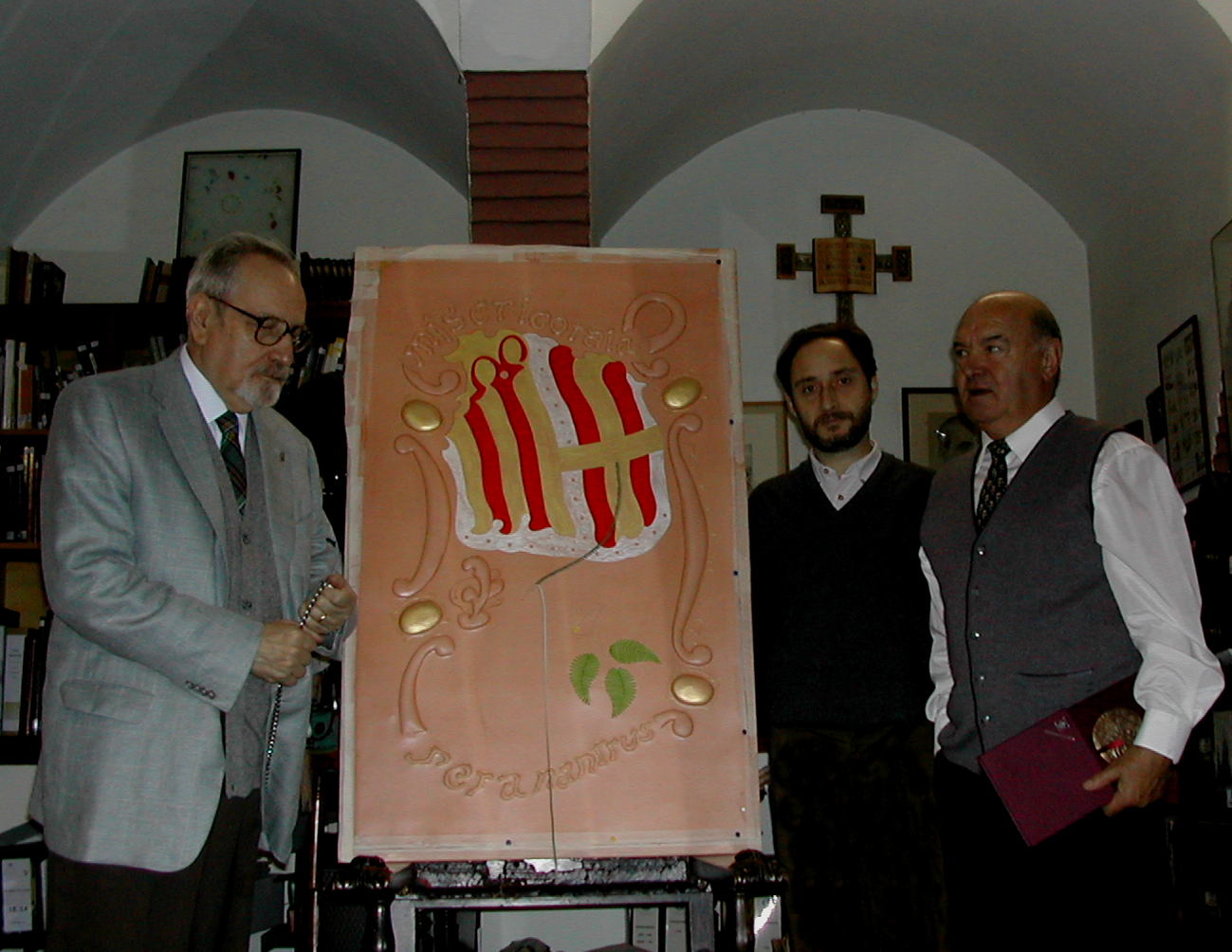
The replica of the banner under construction at Finca Güell. In the photo Joan Bassegoda Nonell, Mario Andruet and Enric Ferrer Solà (Photo: Antonio Gaudí Foundation)

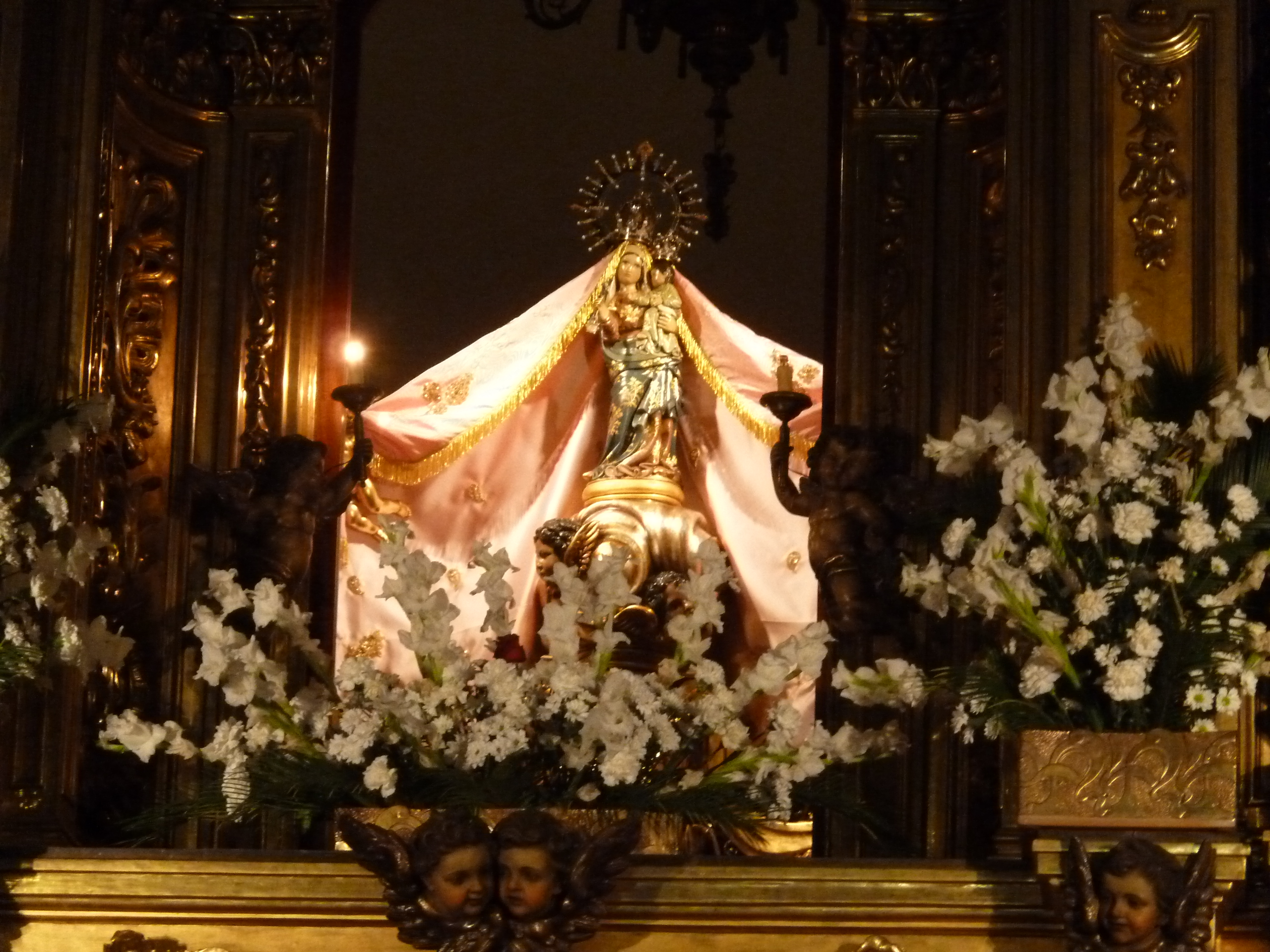
The image of the Virgin in the sanctuary with her mantle extended, like the one that crowned the banner

In 1976, in commemoration of the 50th anniversary of Gaudí’s death the Reus City Council began the construction of a replica of the fountain-cascade of the Casa Vicens, which had been demolished in 1946. It was destined a site close to the "Gaudí" neighbourhood. The works were paralyzed in 1978 and without the construction being finished; it was demolished in 2002.

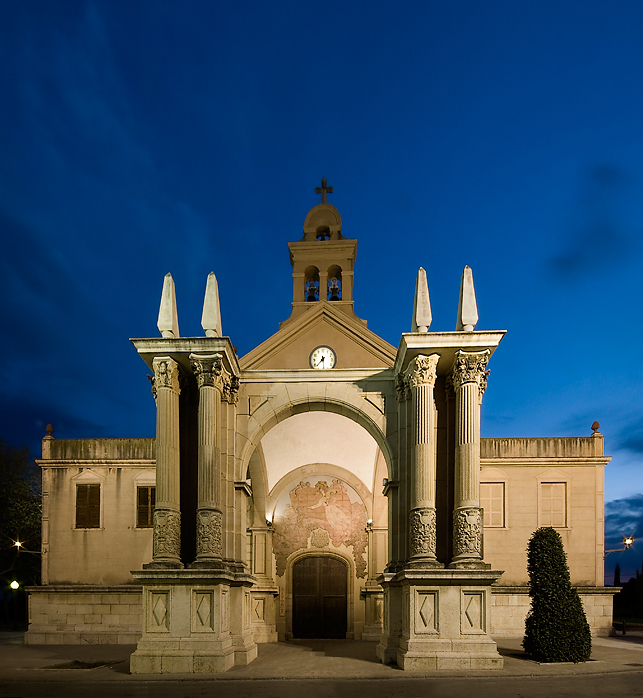
The sanctuary of Misericordia of Reus at present.

The project of the banner and the restoration of the Sanctuary enter fully into the controversy over Gaudí's birthplace, which is disputed by Reus and Riudoms. The paternal family was from Riudoms and his mother was of Reus, separated by a few kilometers. Gaudí's childhood was divided between these two villages, so it is likely to think that he felt himself a son of both.

== See also ==
- Antoni Gaudí
- Modernisme
- Modernismo catalán (in Spanish)
- Reus
- Santuario de Misericordia (in Spanish)
- Isabel Besora (in Catalan)

== Bibliography ==
- BASSEGODA NONELL, JOAN (1985). El inacabado monumento a Gaudí en la ciudad de Reus: la cascada de la Casa Vicens. ABC. 5-6-1989.
- BASSEGODA NONELL, JOAN (1988). Gaudí. Biblioteca Salvat de grandes biografías. Barcelona. Salvat. ISBN 843458205-8.
- BASSEGODA NONELL, JOAN (1989). El gran Gaudí. Sabadell. Ausa. ISBN 84-86329-44-2.
- BERGÓS MASSÓ, JOAN. (1974). Gaudí El Hombre y la Obra. Barcelona. Universidad Politécnica de Barcelona. ISBN 84-600-6248-1.
- MARTINELL, CÈSAR (1967) Gaudí. Su vida, su teoría, su obra. Barcelona. Colegio de Arquitectos de Cataluña y Baleares.
- RÀFOLS, JOSEP F. y FOLGUERA, FRANCESC (1929) Gaudí. Barcelona. Canosa.
- Semanario Católico de Reus. April 21, 1900.
- Semanario Católico de Reus. July 21, 1900.
