= Ríos de Misericordia =

- Also known as: Niños Ríos de Misericordia
- Origin: Zacango, Acolman, Mexico
- Genres: Mexican, Christian
- Years active: 2001–present

Ríos de Misericordia ("Rivers of Mercy"), also known as Niños Ríos de Misericordia ("Rivers of Mercy Children") is a Mexican Christian musical group of eight children from the children's shelter of the same name in Zacango, Acolman municipality, State of Mexico. The group has released 20 studio albums since 2001.

== Selected discography ==
- Mi vida y mi voz (Volume 1)
- Al Cordero gloria (Volume 2)
- Es por Tu gracia (Volume 9)
- Heme aquí (Volume 11)
- Tienen que saber (Volume 13)
- Amor tan Grande (Volume 15)
