= Castelnuovo della Misericordia =

- Frazione
- Location of Castelnuovo della Misericordia in Italy
- Coordinates: 43°26′33″N 10°27′0″E
- Country: Italy
- Region: Tuscany
- Province: Livorno (LI)
- Comune: Rosignano Marittimo
- Elevation: 165 m (541 ft)

Population (2011)
  - Total: 834
- Time zone: UTC+1 (CET)
  - Summer (DST): UTC+2 (CEST)
- Postal code: 57016
- Dialing code: (+39) 0586

Castelnuovo della Misericordia is a village in Tuscany, central Italy, administratively a frazione of the comune of Rosignano Marittimo, province of Livorno. At the time of the 2011 census its population was 843.

The village is about 24 km from Livorno and 5 km from Rosignano Marittimo.

== Bibliography ==
- Emanuele Repetti (1833). "Castelnuovo della Misericordia". Dizionario Geografico Fisico Storico della Toscana. Florence.
