= Rosignano Marittimo =

Municipality in Tuscany, Italy

- Comune
- Comune di Rosignano Marittimo
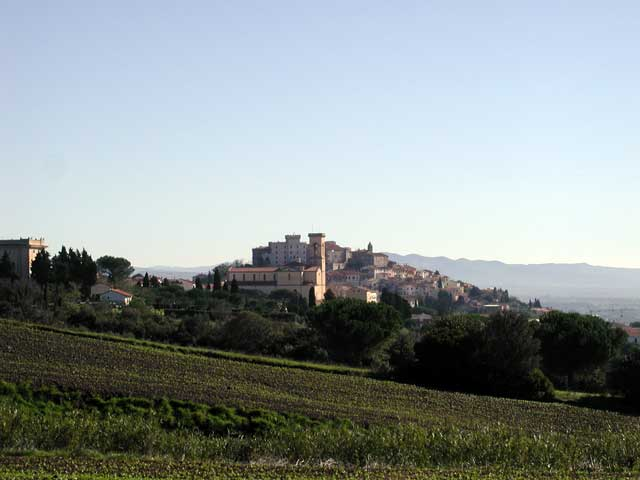

- Coat of arms

- Location within Italy Location within Tuscany
- Coordinates: 43°24′N 10°28′E
- Country: Italy
- Region: Tuscany
- Province: Livorno (LI)
- Frazioni: Castelnuovo della Misericordia, Castiglioncello, Gabbro, Nibbiaia, Rosignano Solvay, Vada

Government
  - Mayor: Daniele Donati

Area
  - Total: 120.3 km^{2} (46.4 sq mi)
- Elevation: 147 m (482 ft)

Population (January 2017)
  - Total: 31,197
  - Density: 259.3/km^{2} (671.7/sq mi)
- Demonym: Marci
- Time zone: UTC+1 (CET)
  - Summer (DST): UTC+2 (CEST)
- Postal code: 57016
- Dialing code: 0586
- Patron saint: Nicholas of Tolentino
- Saint day: September 10
- Website: Official website

Rosignano Marittimo is a comune (municipality) in the Province of Livorno in the Italian region Tuscany, located about 80 kilometres (50 miles) southwest of Florence and about 20 kilometres (12 mi) southeast of Livorno.

== Geography ==
Rosignano Marittimo borders the following municipalities: Castellina Marittima, Cecina, Collesalvetti, Livorno, Orciano Pisano, Santa Luce.

== Government ==
=== Frazioni ===
The comune is formed by the municipal seat of Rosignano Marittimo and the frazioni – towns and villages – of Castelnuovo della Misericordia, Castiglioncello, Gabbro, Nibbiaia, Rosignano Solvay and Vada. The resort town of La Mazzanta is also included in the municipality.

== History ==
=== World War II ===
During World War II a major United States Army Air Force base was located near Rosignano, controlled by the Twelfth Air Force. After the war the airfield was closed and the land returned to agricultural use. Today there is little or no evidence of its existence.

== Twin towns ==
Rosignano Marittimo is twinned with:

- Champigny-sur-Marne, France
- Musselburgh, United Kingdom
- (Sahrawi Arab Democratic Republic) Zug, Western Sahara

== See also ==
- Vada Shoal Lighthouse
- Castello Pasquini
