= Palmaiola Lighthouse =

Isolotto di Palmaiola
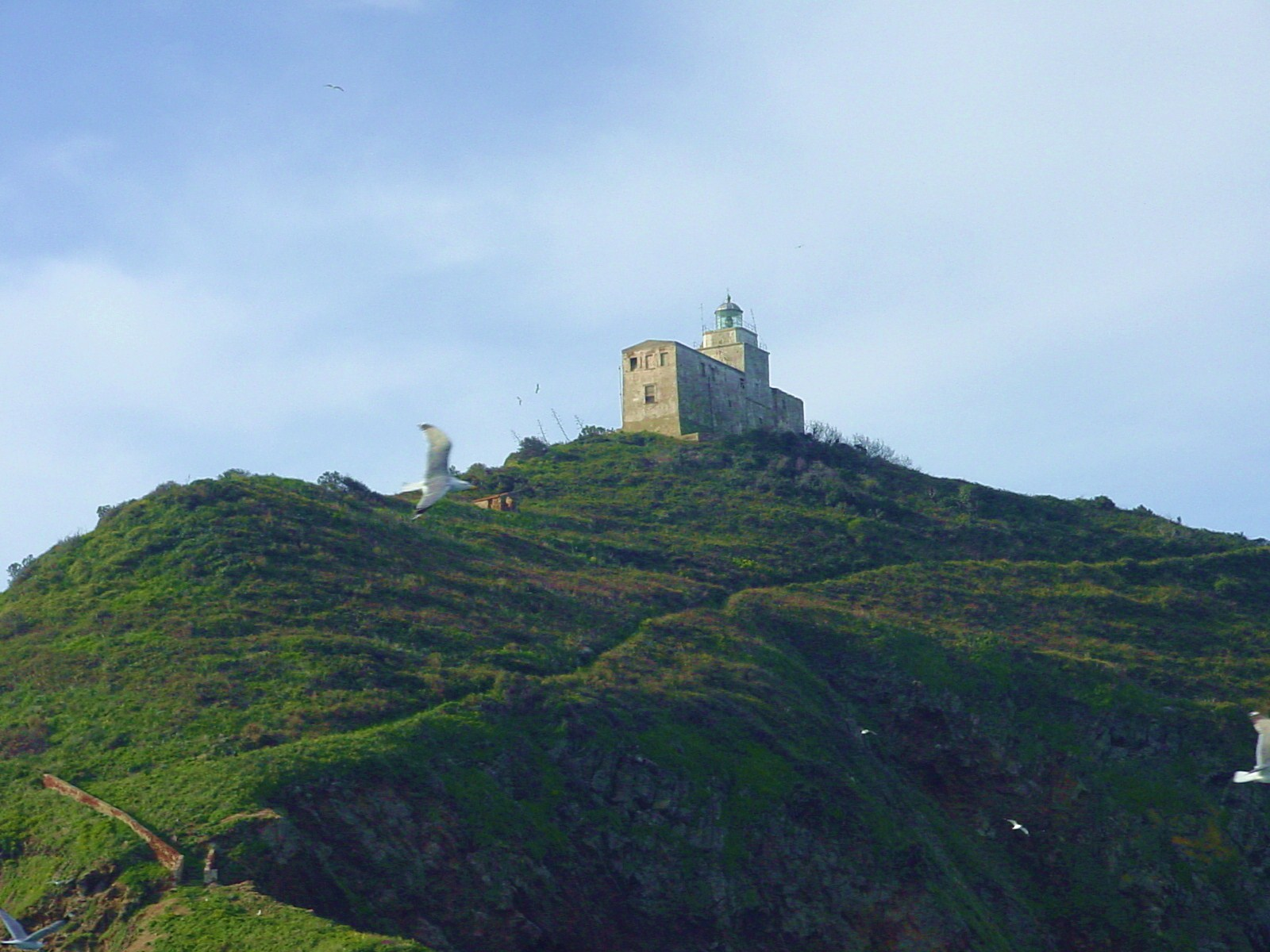
- The lighthouse
- Location: Palmaiola; Tuscany; Italy
- Coordinates: 42°51′57″N 10°28′28″E

Tower
- Constructed: 1844
- Construction: brick building and tower
- Height: 14 metres (46 ft)
- Shape: quadrangular tower with balcony and lantern
- Markings: white tower and building, grey metallic dome
- Power source: solar power
- Operator: Marina Militare

Light
- Focal height: 105 metres (344 ft)
- Intensity: main: MAXILED-400 EFF 10W reserve: LABI 100 10,3
- Range: 10 nautical miles (19 km; 12 mi)
- Characteristic: Fl W 5s.
- Italy no.: 2016 E.F

Palmaiola Lighthouse (Italian: Faro di Palmaiola) is an active lighthouse, placed on the summit of the same name islet, in the Tuscan Archipelago between Piombino and Elba in Rio Marina.

== History ==
The Pisans built on the islet a watch tower in 909 which was restored by Jacopo V Appiano of the Principality of Piombino in 1534; a new lighthouse and the keeper’s house were inaugurated on January 15, 1844, and were operated by the Civil engineering for the Maritime Works; in 1911 the light was transferred to the Regia Marina Lighthouse Service.

== Description ==
The lighthouse consists of one-story white building, surmounted by a quadrangular tower, 14 metres height, with gallery and lantern situated at 105 metres above sea level. The light is active, fully automated and operated by Marina Militare identified by the code number 2016 E.F. Near the building a helipad was erected and used by the Marina Militare EH-101 to fly in regularly the maintenance team. The lighthouse has a solar power unit and emits an alternating single white flashing in a five seconds period visible up to 10 nautical miles.; in 2008 underwent to renewal works.

== See also ==
- Palmaiola
- List of lighthouses in Italy
- Tuscan Archipelago
