= Scoglio d'Africa =

Nickname: Formica di Montecristo
- Location within Tuscany

Geography
- Location: Tyrrhenian Sea
- Coordinates: 42°18′06.46″N 10°04′0.0″E
- Archipelago: Tuscan Archipelago
- Highest elevation: 3 m (10 ft)

Administration
- Italy
- Region: Tuscany
- Province: Livorno
- Comune: Portoferraio

Demographics
- Population: uninhabited

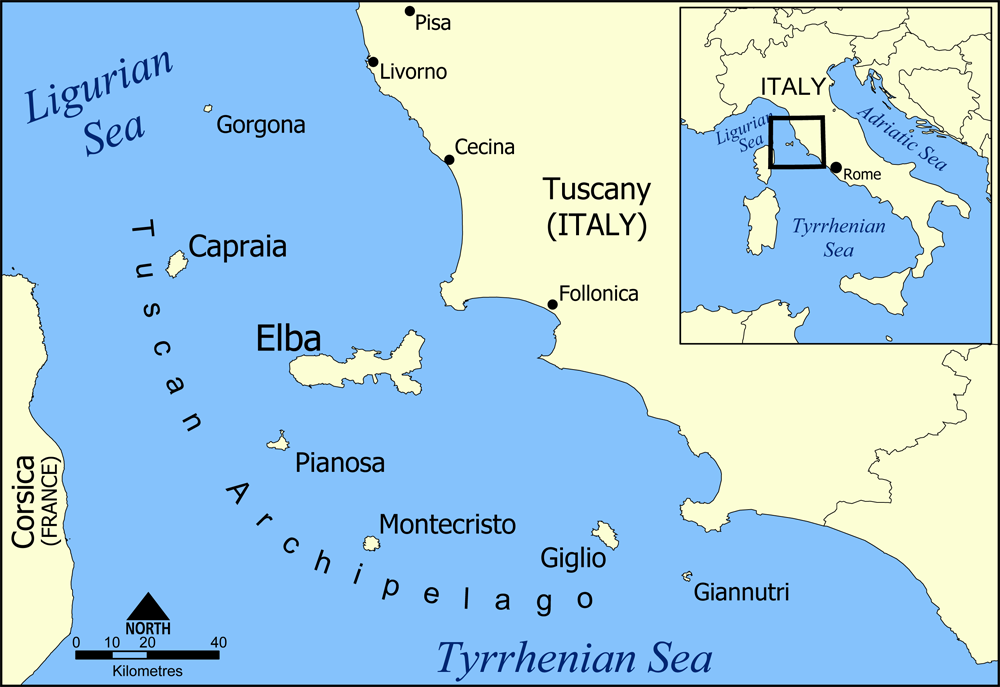
Map of the Tuscan Archipelago

The Scoglio d'Africa (or Scoglio d'Affrica) also named Formica di Monte Cristo ("Monte Cristo's Ant"), is a solitary small skerry belonging to the Tuscan Archipelago located in open sea between the Tyrrhenian Sea and the Corsica Channel. It is located 18.5 km (10 nautical miles) west of the Island of Montecristo, 23.5 km (12.7 nautical miles) south of Pianosa Island and 43.1 km (23.3 nautical miles) east of Corsica. Administratively it belongs to the municipality of Portoferraio. It is also part of the Tuscan Archipelago National Park.

== Description ==
Regarding its size and its shape, it can be considered to all effects an emergent rock in a stretch of shallow sea. It has a rounded contour with the diameter of 70 m (230 feet), an area of 3,000 m^{2} (32,000 sq ft) and an altitude of only 3 m (10 feet) above sea level depending from the tides and the waves. Geologically the skerry belongs to a submarine ridge starting few miles east of Capraia and it extends toward south up to reach Pianosa. The ridge is lying at an average depth of 80 m (260 feet) but it decreases in proximity of the island to arrive at 8 m (26 feet). The depths in the region among the skerry and Montecristo reach 200 m (660 feet).

== Fauna ==
The seabed around the rock is composed by two types of biocoenosis; the first is formed by algae, bryozoa and polychaetes that form a structure rich in cavities; the second is formed by prairies of Posidonia.

== See also ==
- Scoglio d'Africa Lighthouse
