= Scoglio d'Africa Lighthouse =

Scoglio d'Africa
- Location: Tuscan archipelago Tuscany; Italy
- Coordinates: 42°21′30″N 10°03′51″E

Tower
- Constructed: 1867
- Foundation: concrete base
- Construction: stone tower
- Height: 16 metres (52 ft)
- Shape: cylindrical tower with lantern and gallery on conical truncated base
- Markings: unpainted stone tower, grey lantern dome
- Power source: solar power
- Operator: Marina Militare

Light
- Focal height: 19 metres (62 ft)
- Lens: Type OF
- Intensity: MaxiHalo-60 EFF
- Range: 12 nautical miles (22 km; 14 mi)
- Characteristic: Fl W 5s.
- Italy no.: 2096 E.F

Scoglio d'Africa Lighthouse (Italian: Faro di Scoglio d'Africa) is an active lighthouse located on a solitary skerry, Scoglio d'Africa, in open Tyrrhenian Sea halfway Montecristo and Pianosa.

== Description ==
The lighthouse built, in 1867, on a platform has a conical base, in order to resist the waves, surmounted by a cylindrical tower in white stone with balcony and lantern 16 metres (52 ft) high. The lighthouse is powered by a solar unit, the focal plane is at 19 metres (62 ft) above sea level and the lantern emits a single white flash every 5 seconds visible up to 12 nautical miles (22 km; 14 mi). The light is operated by the Lighthouses Service of Marina Militare identified by the code number 2096 E.F.

== See also ==
- List of lighthouses in Italy
