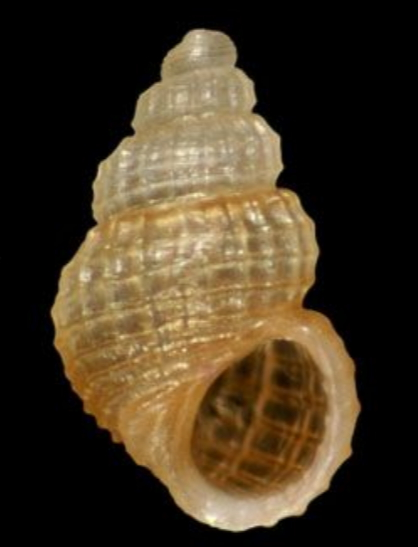
- Shell of Alvania dianiensis (specimen at the Natural History Museum, Rotterdam)

Scientific classification
- Kingdom: Animalia
- Phylum: Mollusca
- Class: Gastropoda
- Subclass: Caenogastropoda
- Order: Littorinimorpha
- Family: Rissoidae
- Genus: Alvania
- Species: A. dianiensis

Binomial name
- Alvania dianiensis Oliverio, 1988

= Alvania dianiensis =

Species of gastropod

Alvania dianiensis is a species of minute sea snail, a marine gastropod mollusk or micromollusk in the family Rissoidae.

== Description ==
The length of the shell varies between 2 mm and 3 mm.

== Distribution ==
This marine species occurs in the Tuscan Archipelago, west of Tuscany, Italy.
