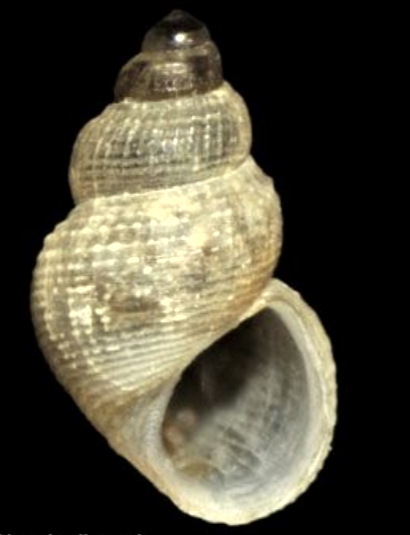
- Shell of Alvania dipacoi (specimen at the Natural History Museum, Rotterdam)

Scientific classification
- Kingdom: Animalia
- Phylum: Mollusca
- Class: Gastropoda
- Subclass: Caenogastropoda
- Order: Littorinimorpha
- Family: Rissoidae
- Genus: Alvania
- Species: A. dipacoi

Binomial name
- Alvania dipacoi Giusti Fr. & Nofroni, 1989

= Alvania dipacoi =

Species of sea snail

Alvania dipacoi is a species of minute sea snail, a marine gastropod mollusk or micromollusk in the family Rissoidae.

== Description ==
Alvania dipacoi is a small sea snail with a shell of 2-2.6 mm in length. The shell is a spiral shape and generally an off white colour.

== Distribution ==
It can be found in the Mediterranean sea around the Tuscan Archipelago, and also around the Canary Islands and West Africa (Mauretania).
