= Pianosa Lighthouse =

Pianosa lighthouse
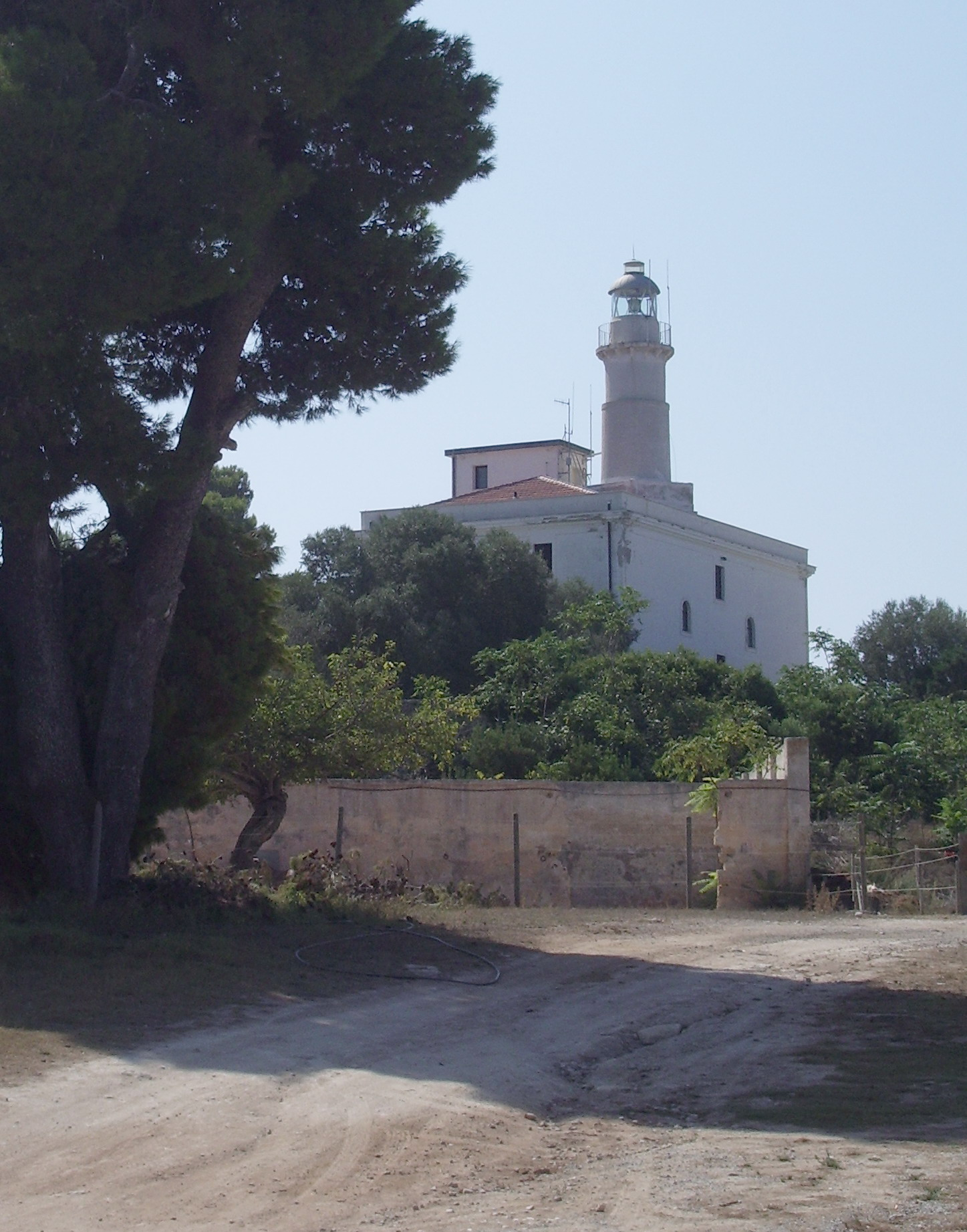
- Location: Pianosa Island; Tuscany; Italy
- Coordinates: 42°35′09″N 10°05′46″E

Tower
- Constructed: 1864
- Foundation: masonry base
- Construction: brick tower
- Height: 19 metres (62 ft)
- Shape: cylindrical tower with lantern and gallery atop a 2-storey keeper’s house
- Markings: white building and tower
- Power source: mains electricity
- Operator: Marina Militare

Light
- First lit: October 1, 1865
- Focal height: 42 metres (138 ft)
- Lens: Type TD
- Intensity: main: AL 1000 W reserve: LABI 100 W
- Range: main: 16 nautical miles (30 km; 18 mi) reserve: 10 nautical miles (19 km; 12 mi)
- Characteristic: Fl (2) W 10s.
- Italy no.: 2088 E.F

Pianosa Lighthouse (Faro di Isola Pianosa) is an active lighthouse located on the east side of Pianosa Island.

== Description ==
The lighthouse entered service on 1 October 1865, is currently operated by the Marina Militare. The structure is identified by the code number 2088 E.F. The lighthouse is a two-story building surmounted by a white cylindrical tower 19 metres (62 ft) high with balcony and lantern positioned at 42 metres (138 ft) above sea level. The light emits two white flashes in a 10 seconds period visible at 16 nautical miles (30 km; 18 mi) of distance.

== See also ==
- List of lighthouses in Italy
- Pianosa
- Tuscan Archipelago
