= Calamita =

Hill on the island of Elba, Italy

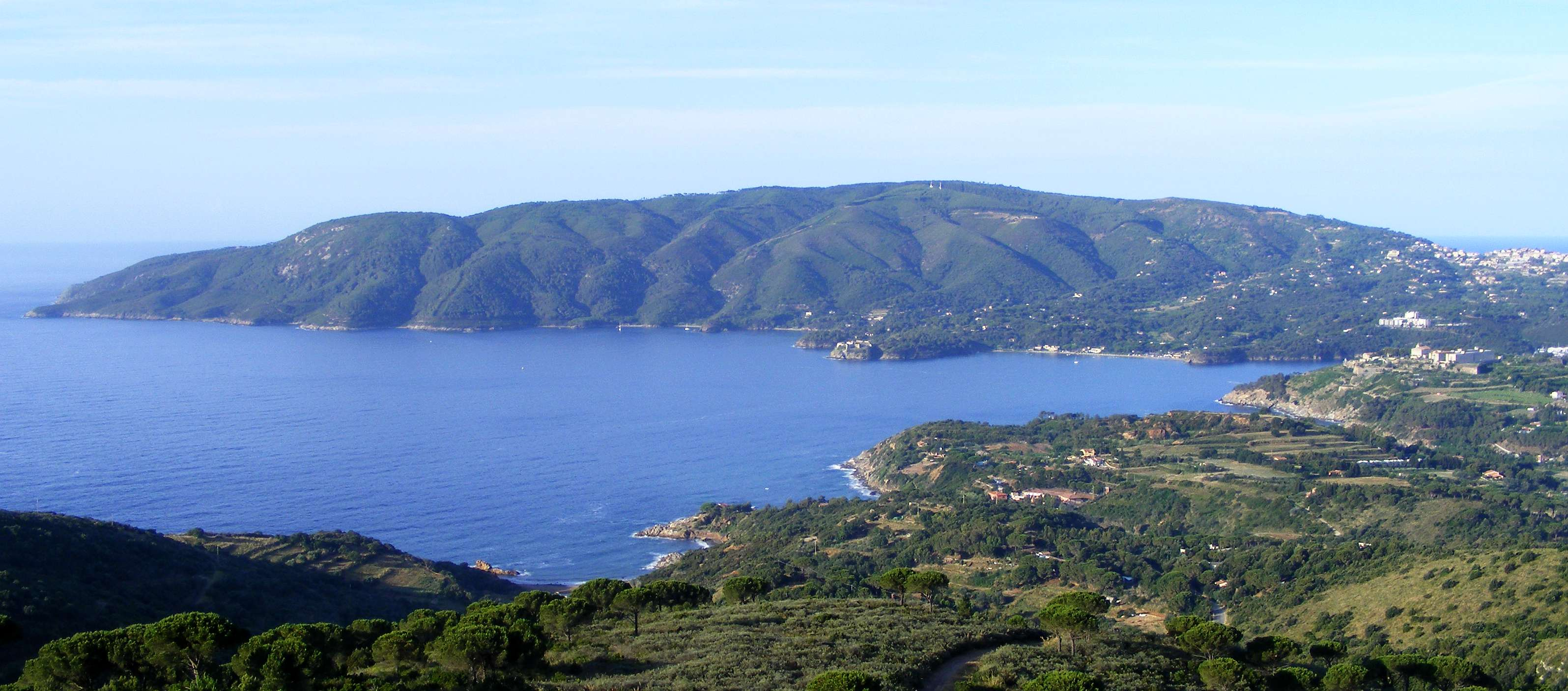
Calamita Mount (Elba Island, LI, Italy) as seen from Arco Mount Arcipelago Toscano National Park.

Calamita (English: Magnet) is a large hill lying on the south-east side of the island of Elba, known for a remarkable landscape and views of Portoferraio and Monte Capanne. The hill's development dates from Elba's ancient periods, when Calamita was a major iron mining center.

The Calamita's coast has been nicknamed "Costa dei Gabbiani" ("Skua Coast"), after the numerous skuas which nest in the cliffs.

The town of Capoliveri sits on the north side of Calamita, overlooking the Mola flats.

The southeast area of the hill is dotted with farmland, though much of it has been converted into tourist resorts and villas.

On the south side is the Calamita iron mine, abandoned since 1981, where pyrite nuggets can still be found.
