= Mount Capanne =

Mountain in Italy

Monte Capanne
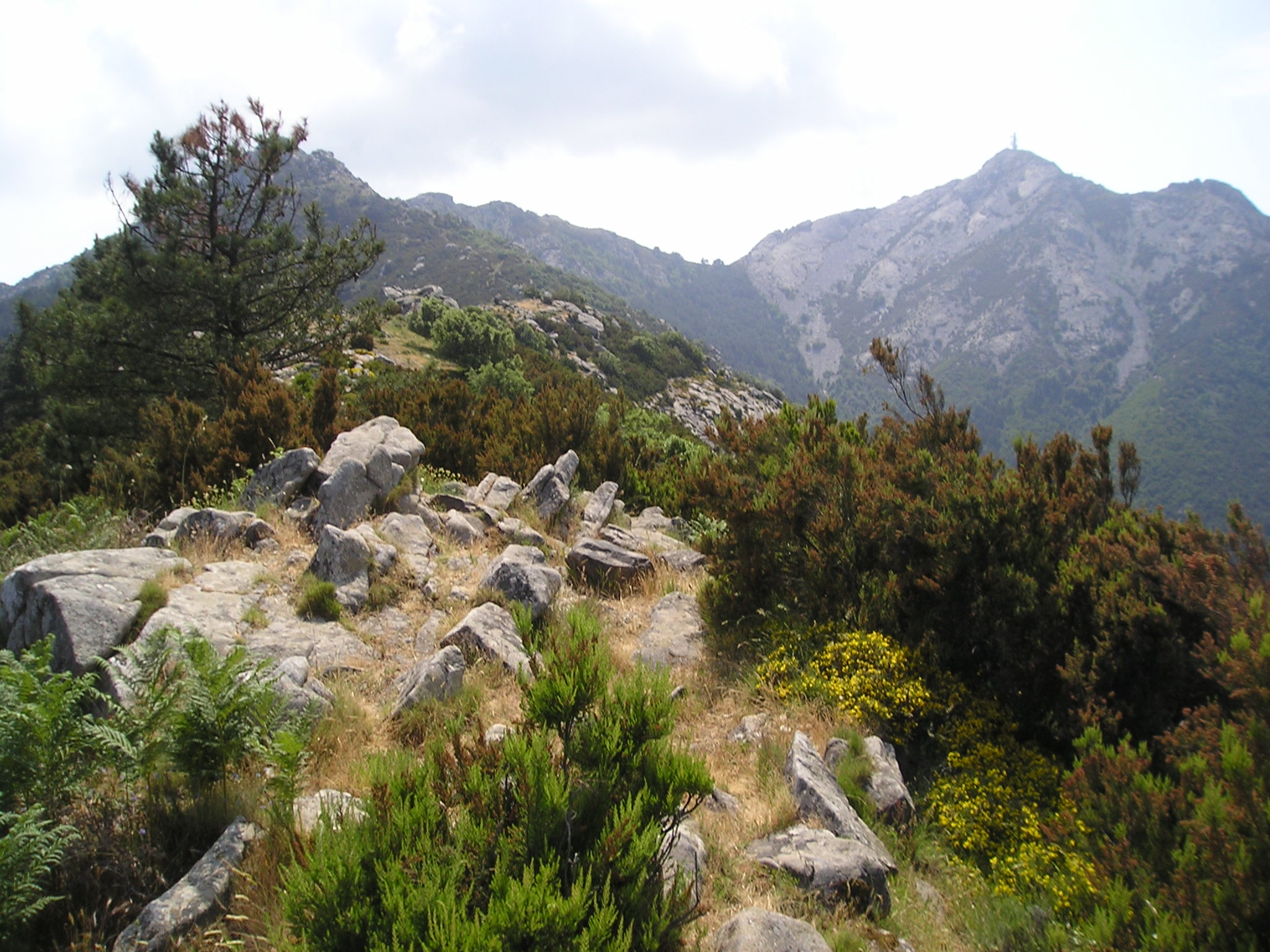
- Highest mountain of Elba

Highest point
- Elevation: 1,017 m (3,337 ft)
- Prominence: 1,017 m (3,337 ft)
- Listing: Ribu
- Coordinates: 42°46′16″N 10°10′03″E

Geography
- Location within Italy
- Location: Elba, Italy

Mount Capanne (Italian: Monte Capanne) is the highest mountain on the Italian island of Elba and in the province of Livorno, Tuscany, Italy. It is located in the western part of the island, reaching a height of 1,017 metres (3,337 ft) in elevation above the Mediterranean Sea.

== Features ==
The mountain is part of the Arcipelago Toscano National Park.

The Monte Capanne summit can be reached in 14 minutes via cable car, which departs from Marciana.
The mountain has Matorral shrublands and woodlands vegetation habitats, of the Mediterranean forests, woodlands, and scrub biome.

== See also ==
- Tuscan Archipelago
