= Scoglietto Lighthouse =

Scoglietto
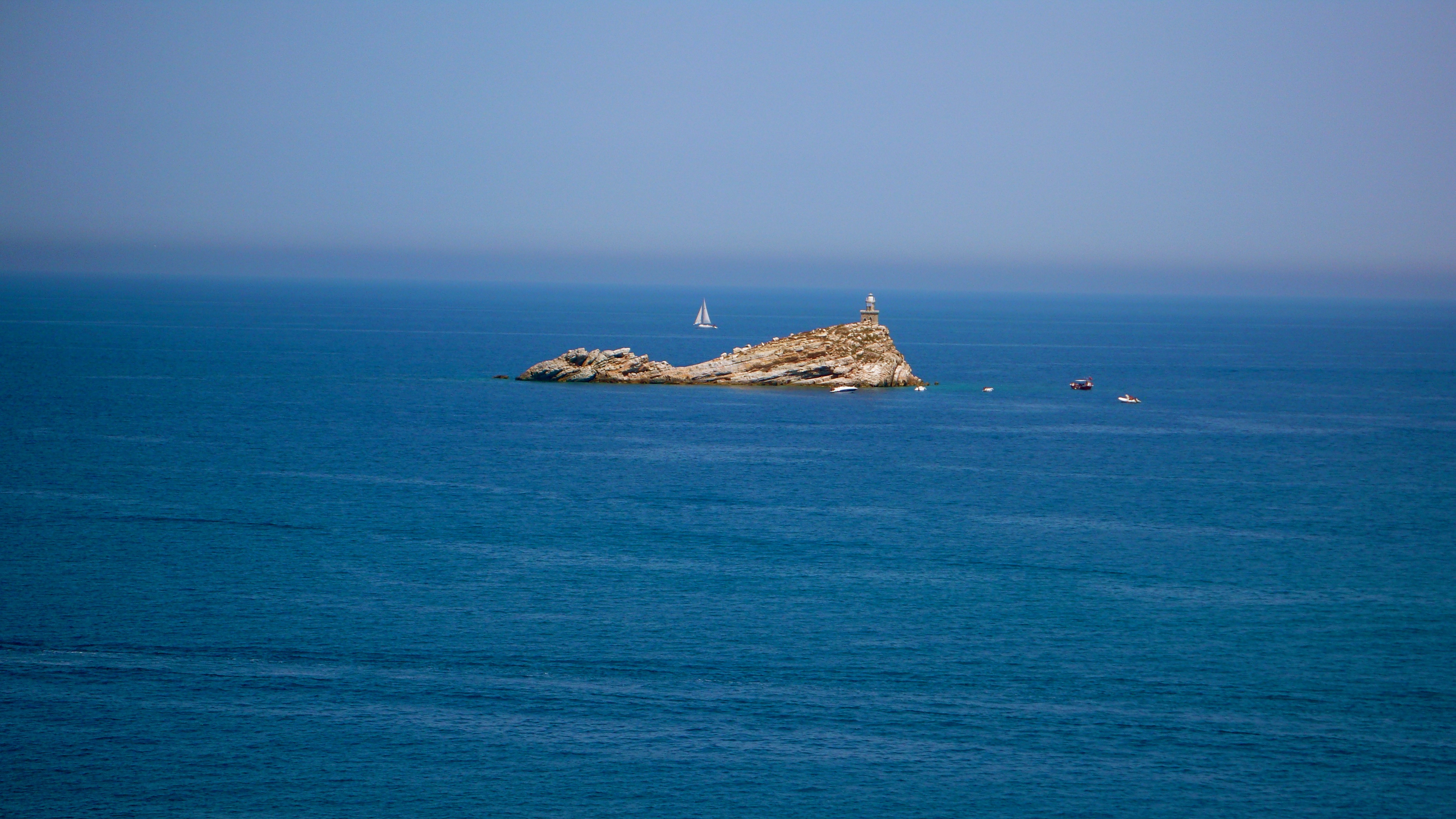
- Scoglietto Lighthouse
- Location: Portoferraio
- Coordinates: 42°49′43″N 10°19′52″E

Tower
- Constructed: 1910 (first)
- Foundation: concrete base
- Construction: stone tower
- Height: 8 metres (26 ft)
- Shape: two-stage cylindrical tower with balcony and lantern
- Markings: unpainted tower, white lantern
- Power source: solar power
- Operator: Marina Militare

Light
- First lit: 1945 (current)
- Focal height: 24 metres (79 ft)
- Lens: Type TD
- Intensity: MaxiHalo-60
- Range: 5 nautical miles (9.3 km; 5.8 mi)
- Characteristic: Fl (2) W 6s.
- Italy no.: 2068 E.F.

Scoglietto Lighthouse Italian: Faro dello Scoglietto is an active lighthouse located on the summit of a rocky islet without vegetation located in front of Portoferraio in the Piombino Channel at 1.4 kilometres (0.87 mi) from Punta Capo Bianco and 1 kilometre (0.62 mi) from Punta Falconaia.

== Description ==
The first historic lighthouse was established in 1910. It was reconstructed in 1945 due to its destruction during World War II. The lighthouse is a small, square, stone keeper's cottage with a cylindrical stone tower, 8 metres (26 ft) high. Positioned at one corner it has a balcony, and the lantern is at 24 metres (79 ft) above sea level. The lighthouse is powered by a solar power unit and the lantern emits a group of two alternating white flashes in a six-second period visible up to 5 nautical miles (9.3 km; 5.8 mi). The lighthouse is fully automated and operated by Marina Militare identified by the code number 2068 E.F.

== See also ==
- List of lighthouses in Italy
