= Palmaiola =

Island in Italy

Coordinates: 42°51′58″N 10°28′30″E

Native name: Isola di Palmaiola
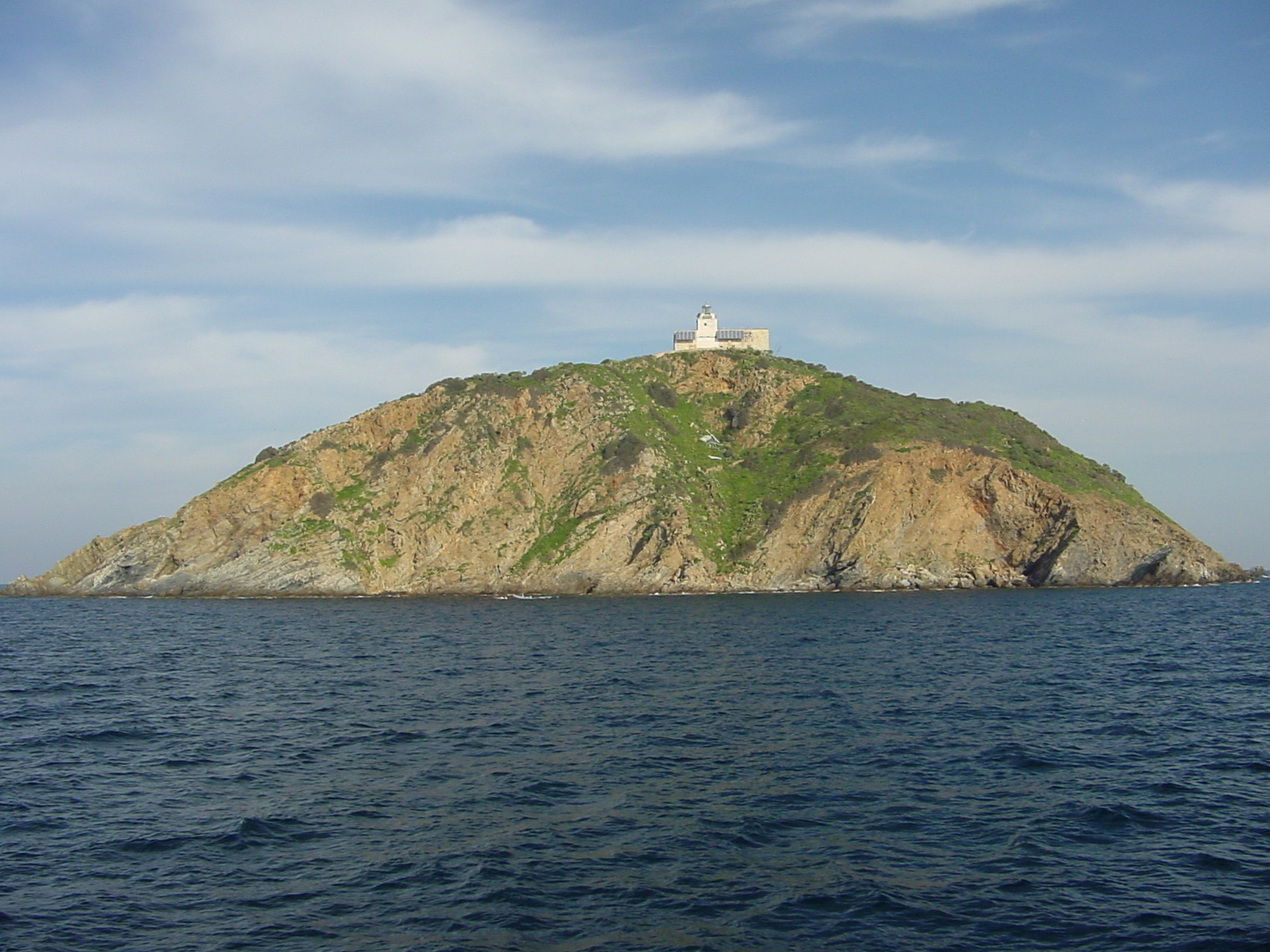
- Palmaiola island and the lighthouse

Geography
- Location: Tyrrhenian Sea
- Archipelago: Tuscan Archipelago
- Area: 0.70 km^{2} (0.27 sq mi)
- Length: 0.461 km (0.2865 mi)
- Width: 0.396 km (0.2461 mi)
- Coastline: 1.75 km (1.087 mi)
- Highest elevation: 85 m (279 ft)

Administration
- Italy
- Region: Tuscany
- Province: Livorno
- Comune: Rio Marina

Demographics
- Population: inhabited

Palmaiola is an islet located in the middle of Piombino Channel, at 3 kilometres (1.9 mi) from Elba and 7 kilometres (4.3 mi) from Piombino; it is part of the comune of Rio Marina and is wholly owned by the State.

== Geography ==
In the 14th century it was named Insulam Palmarole because of the abundance of the Mediterranean dwarf palm at that time. Palmaiola has rocky and craggy cliffs and has a triangular shape; it is 461 metres long, 396 metres wide, 85 metres high and has 1.7 km of coast. It is integrated in the European Union Special Protection Area as Site of Community Importance and it is part of the Arcipelago Toscano National Park.

== Fauna ==
Palmaiola has the advantage of having inaccessible cliffs and a bushy and low vegetation as the garrigue, formed by evergreen plants. Consequently, the European shag, the Scopoli's shearwater, the Falco peregrinus, and the Audouin's gull find it a safe place to nest. Another endemic species on the islet is the European leaf-toed gecko.

== Palmaiola Lighthouse ==
The Pisans built in 909C.E. a tower restored by the Appiano of the Principality of Piombino in 1534; a new lighthouse and the keeper’s house were built on 15 January 1844 and were operated by the Civil engineering for the Maritime Works; in 1911 it was transferred to the Regia Marina Lighthouse Service. The lighthouse consists of a one-story white building, 14 metres high, surmounted by a quadrangular tower with balcony and lantern situated at a height of 105 metres above sea level. It is fully automated, active and operated by Marina Militare identified by the code number 2016 E.F. Near the building a helipad was erected which is utilized by the Marina Militare EH-101 to fly in regularly the maintenance team. It has a solar power unit and emits an alternating single white flashing in a five seconds period visible up to 10 nautical miles.

== See also ==
- List of islands of Italy
- Tuscan Archipelago
