= Pianosa =

Island in the Tuscan Archipelago in the Tyrrhenian Sea, Italy

Coordinates: 42°34′56″N 10°04′42″E

Pianosa Island
Native name: Isola di Pianosa
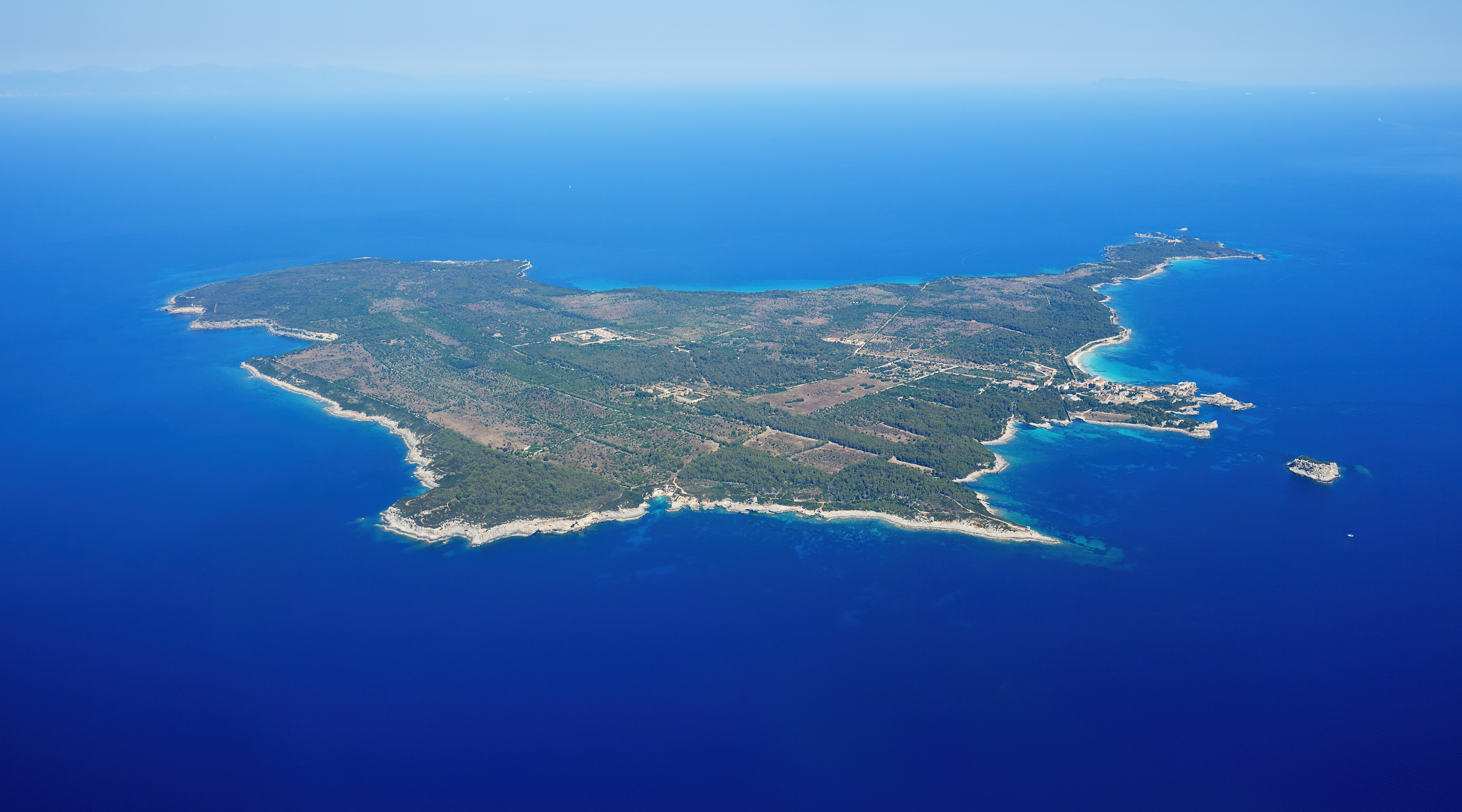
- Aerial view of Pianosa

Geography
- Location: Tyrrhenian Sea
- Archipelago: Tuscan Archipelago
- Area: 10.25 km^{2} (3.96 sq mi)
- Length: 5.8 km (3.6 mi)
- Width: 4.8 km (2.98 mi)
- Coastline: 22 km (13.7 mi)
- Highest elevation: 29 m (95 ft)

Administration
- Italy
- Region: Tuscany
- Province: Livorno
- Comune: Campo nell'Elba
- Capital city: Pianosa

Demographics
- Population: 10 (2001)
- Pop. density: 1/km^{2} (3/sq mi)

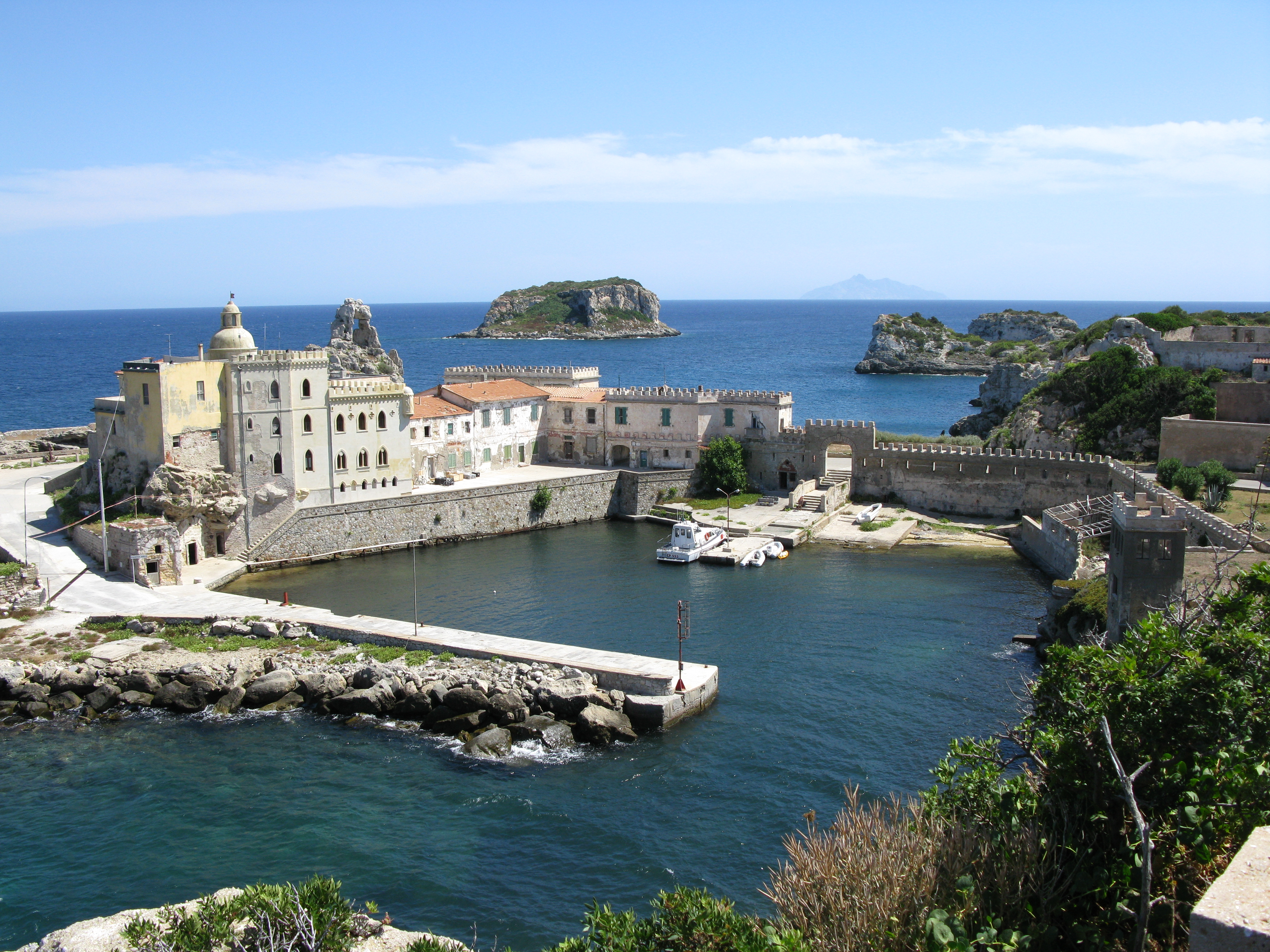
The harbour of Pianosa

Pianosa (Italian pronunciation: [pjaˈnoːza]) is an island in the Tuscan Archipelago in the Tyrrhenian Sea, Italy. It is about 10.25 km^{2} (3.96 sq mi) in area, with a coastal perimeter of 26 km (16 mi).

== Geography ==
In Roman times, the island was named Planasia (plain) because of its flatness – its highest point stands at 29 m (95 ft) above sea level. It is a triangular-shaped land mass 14 km (9 mi) south-west of Elba and is a frazione of the municipality of Campo nell'Elba. Pianosa is the fifth biggest island of the Tuscan Archipelago and the only one to be formed out of sedimentary rock of the Neogene and Quaternary; such fossils as echinoderms, mollusca and bryozoa of the Pliocene are frequently found.

== Flora ==
The vegetation consists mainly of Mediterranean species as lentisco, fennel, juniper, rosemary and Pinus halepensis, which was introduced on the island in the 1900s.

== Fauna ==
The animals living on the island are largely small mammals, such as hedgehog and hare, introduced in the 1800s, as well as the pheasant and the red-legged partridge; the magpie and the Audouin's gull nest along the coast and are protected by the National Park. The island is a stopping place for migrating birds in their seasonal passage from North to South. The sea around Pianosa is rich in fish because the coast was unapproachable for a long time, while today National Park regulations forbid fishing. Grouper, dory, dentex, moray, crawfish and many other species of fish inhabit the seas around the island.

== History ==
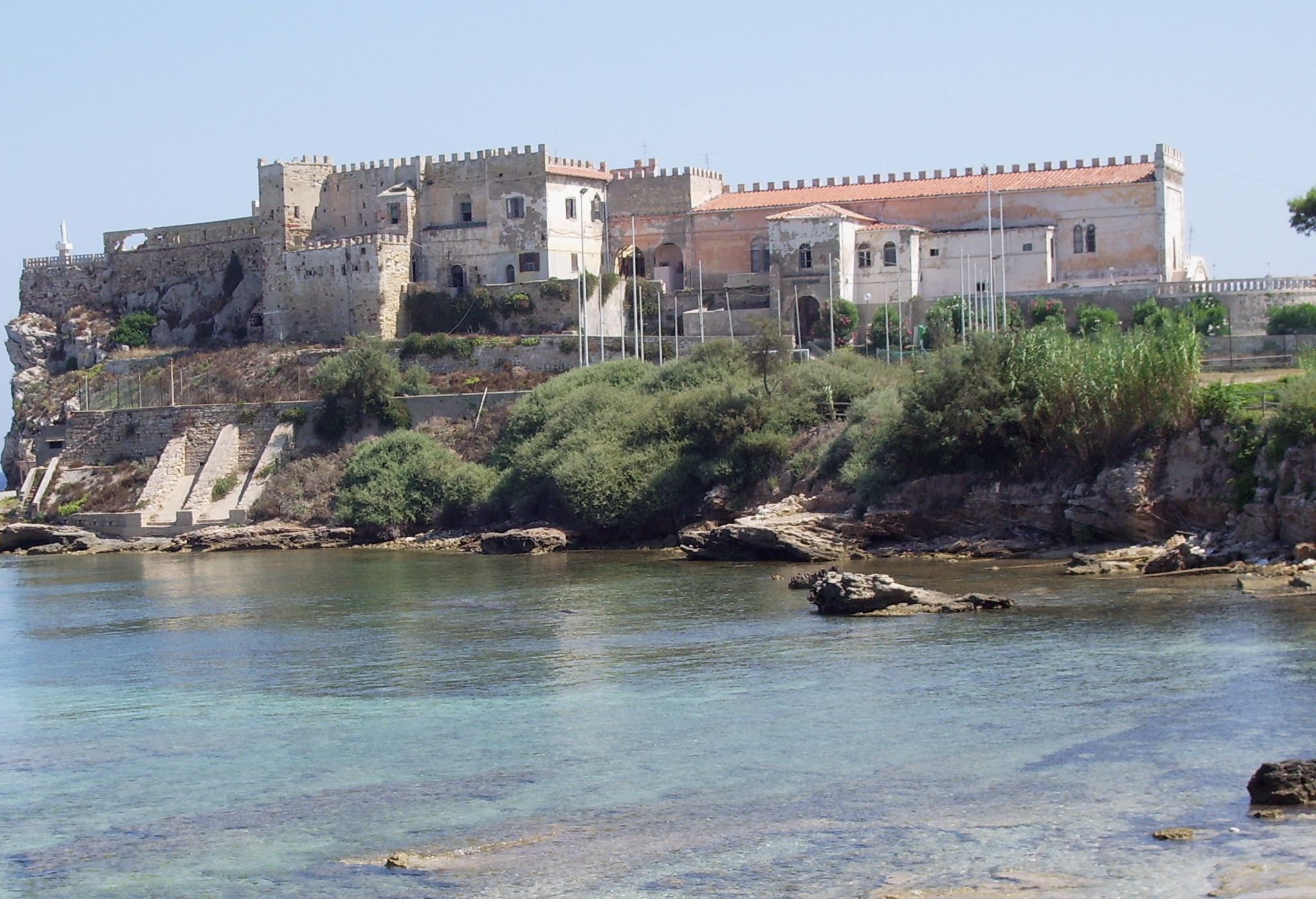
Forte Teglia

The island was first inhabited in the Upper Palaeolithic, the Later Stone Age, but when in 5000 BC the sea level rose and reached the current level, the few inhabitants took refuge on the nearby Scola islet, where traces of their presence were found. Fishing tools and ceramics of the Mesolithic were found, as well as artefacts in quartz and flint, probably coming from Elba. The ancient Romans' Planasia had structures and was extensively cultivated. It became noted in history when the princeps Augustus banished his grandson and former designated heir Agrippa Postumus there in 6 or 7 AD. Postumus remained there until his murder by an assassin sent by Tiberius, around 14 AD. Postumus lived in Pianosa at Villa Agrippa, which was discovered by abbot Gaetano Chierici in the second half of 1800s and included a theatre, a thermal bath (Bagni di Agrippa), and a Roman villa with black and white mosaic floors with marine-themed mythological decorations.

In the 4th century, a small Christian community lived in Pianosa and left traces of their presence in catacombs. These are on two levels and are the largest north of Rome; 700 catacombs were discovered, indicating a fair number of residents.

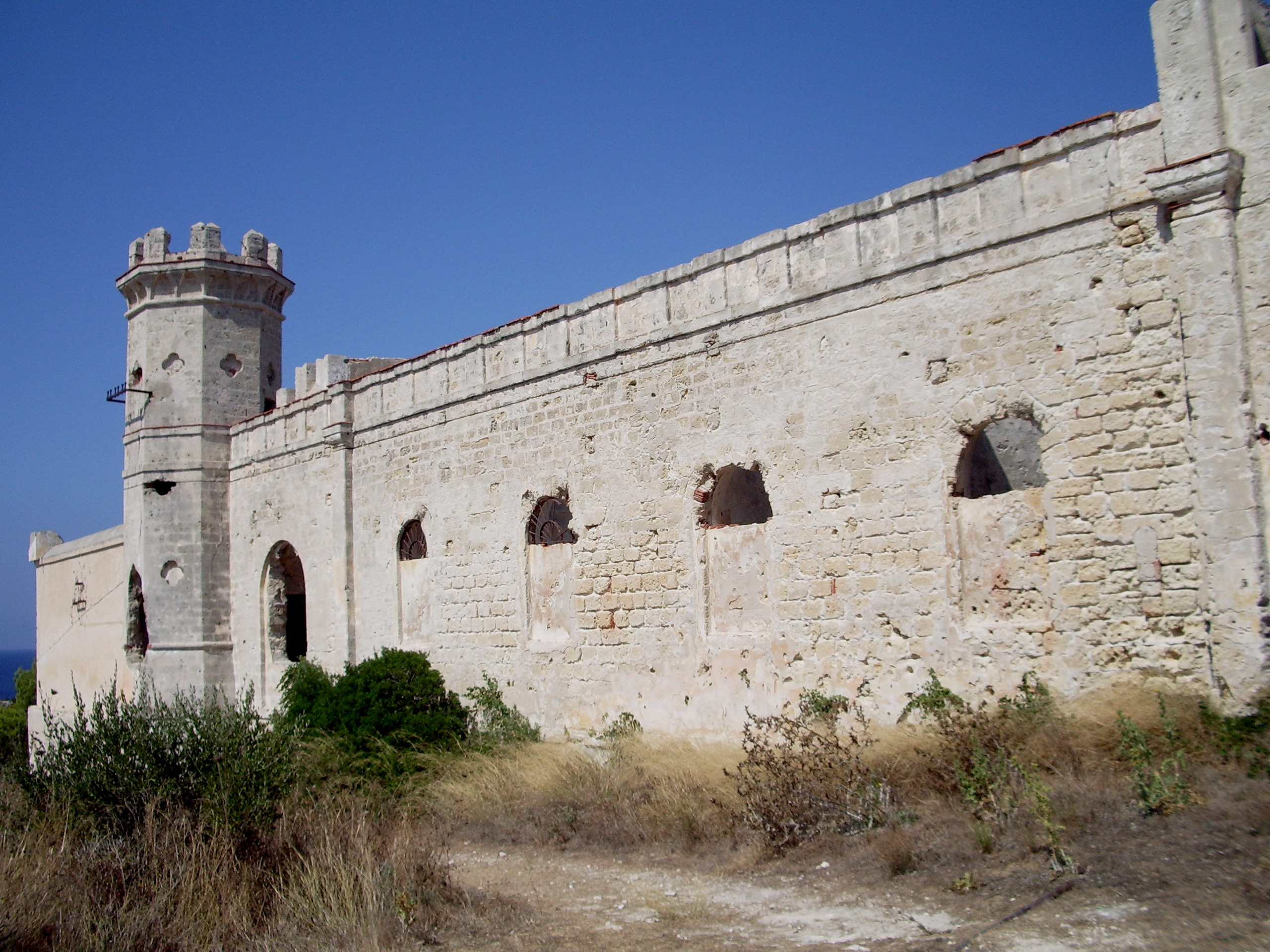
Forte del Marchese

Pisa had custody of the island after a nearby naval battle victory in 874. In the Middle Ages the island's ownership was disputed by Pisa and Genoa because of its strategic position. In 1238, Genoa sent troops to the island with the pretence that the inhabitants engaged in piracy. The troops destroyed the village and the fortifications built by the Pisans and took the 150 inhabitants prisoner. Pianosa was returned shortly afterward to Pisa, but Genoa had the supremacy of the Tyrrhenian Sea after the Battle of Meloria. The island returned to Pisan control under an agreement that required the Pisans to leave it uncultivated and uninhabited, but the pact was not honoured. The Appiano family, who ruled Pisa, leased the island to the De Leis family and then to the Landi family in 1344. The Appianos sold Pisa to Gian Galeazzo Visconti in 1399 and established the small Lordship of Piombino, which included Suvereto, Scarlino, Vignale, Populonia and the islands of Elba, Montecristo and Pianosa. On August 15, 1552, the Holy Roman Emperor Charles V of Spain consigned to Cosimo I de' Medici the Lordship of Piombino in exchange of a loan of 200,000 scudi.

Pianosa underwent numerous incursions by pirates; the worst took place in 1553, when a French Turkish fleet commanded by Dragut wiped out the population. After that, the island changed ownership several times and was populated only seasonally by farmers coming from Elba to cultivate the land. On 27 August 1802, Napoleon established that Elba, Capraia, Gorgona, Pianosa, Palmaiola and Montecristo were part of the French territory and in 1805 assigned the regions of Piombino, Elba, and the part of Pianosa that was fortified to his sister Elisa Bonaparte. On 9 April 1809, the Archipelago returned to Tuscan ownership, when Tuscany was ruled by the French. On 10 May, British marines and sailors from HMS Seahorse and HMS Halcyon landed on Pianosa and Giannutri. The landing parties destroyed the forts and captured about 100 prisoners during four hours of fighting. British losses were one marine killed and one wounded. The landing party also sent the farmers back to Elba and left the island deserted. Napoleon went to Pianosa from Elba twice, rebuilt the tower, set up a garrison to defend the island, and built some houses to settle farmers. The Congress of Vienna assigned Elba and the Tuscan Archipelago to the Grand Duke of Tuscany.

Although 18th-century documents report that it was once densely wooded, humans and the animals they brought have destroyed the trees on the island, which is now largely grassland except some coastal areas.

== Penal colony ==
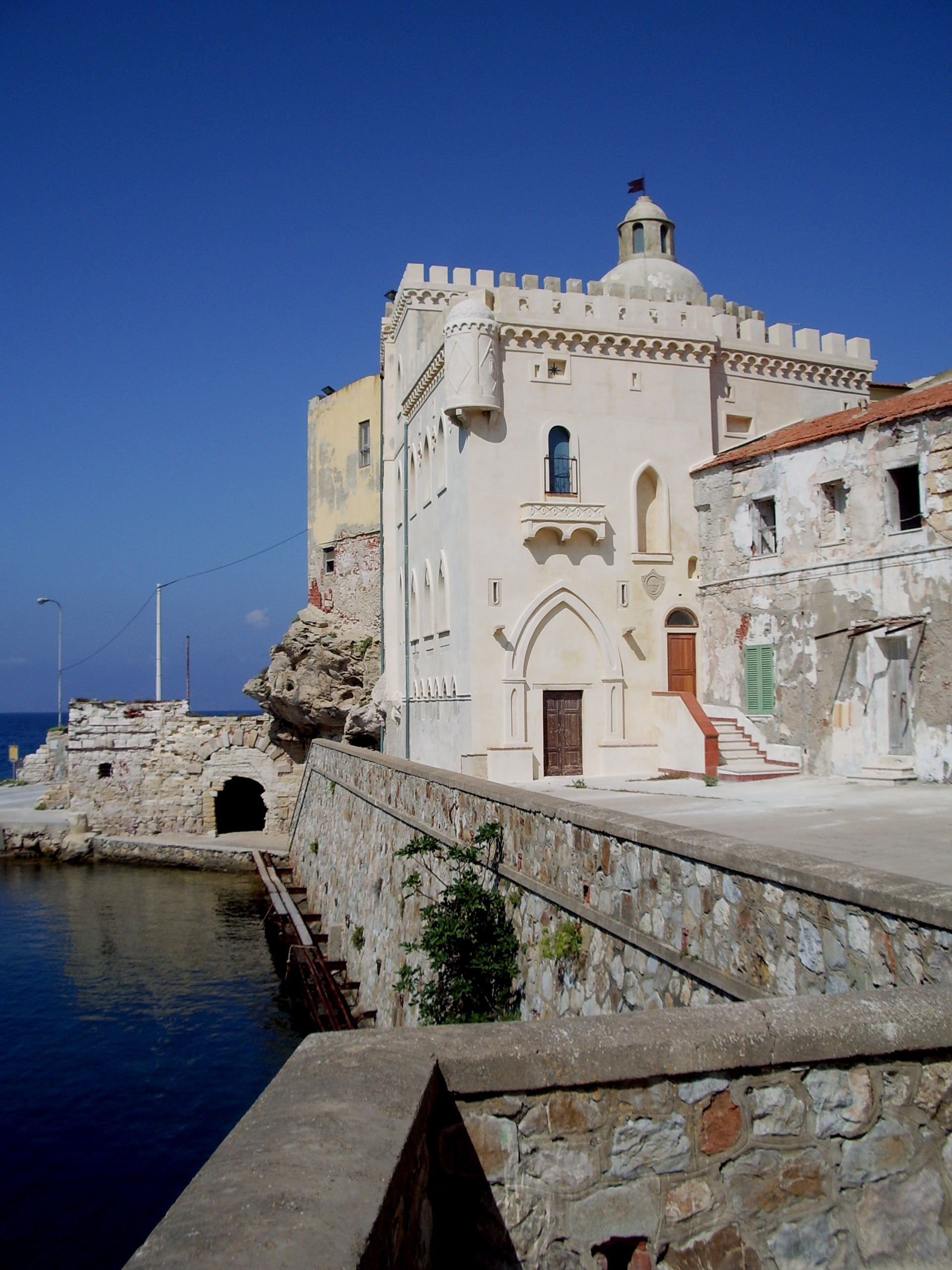
Palazzo della Specola

In 1856, Leopold II, Grand Duke of Tuscany established a penal colony in Pianosa because it was considered a perfect place to isolate, segregate, and oversee detainees. At the proclamation of the Kingdom of Italy in 1861, there were 149 prisoners on the island. In 1864 a structure able to contain 350 prisoners was built, but in 1872 the island was divided into numerous farms organizing the inmates as small communities. In 1880, there were 960 detainees. The captives cultivated cereals, produced oil and wine, such as Sangiovese and Procanico. There were poultry, pig, and cattle farms. From 1884 until 1965, because of its dry climate, Pianosa hosted convicts from the Italian mainland who had been affected by tuberculosis. At the beginning of the 1900s, the population on the island was 21 civilians, 80 prison guards, 40 soldiers, and 800 prisoners. Sandro Pertini, later President of the Republic of Italy, became an inmate in 1932 for political reasons. During World War II, on 17 September 1943, German troops invaded Pianosa and occupied it. On 19 March 1944, French commandos landed on the island and, after a short firefight, left with 40 prison guards as hostages. The following month, an Allied bomber attacked the island, killing six people.

In the post-war period, the colony returned to its original role as a prison island. A Carabinieri station was established, as was a detachment of Guardia di Finanza, and houses were built to accommodate the families of the soldiers. In the 1970s, on order of General Carlo Alberto Dalla Chiesa, the former sanatorium, named Agrippa Branch, was transformed into a maximum security prison to confine Mafia bosses and terrorists of the Red Brigades: Giovanni Senzani, Renato Curcio, Alberto Franceschini, and Bruno Seghetti. Under the article 41-bis prison regime, in May 1977 aircraft and helicopters transferred 600 convicts from all over Italy to Pianosa in only two days. A reinforced concrete wall, six metres high and 3 km (2 mi) long, was built in 1979 to separate the village from the penitentiary. The murder of judges Giovanni Falcone and Paolo Borsellino in 1992 led to the reopening of the Agrippa Branch under the 41-bis regime and during the night of July 20, fifty-five Mafia bosses incarcerated at Palermo Ucciardone prison, among them Michele Greco, were transferred by military transport aircraft to Pisa Airport and then to Pianosa by helicopter.

The island was a prison fortress until 17 July 1997, when Gaetano Murana, the last 41-bis prison regime detainee, was transferred to another prison. Prior to that time Pianosa had hosted Mafia bosses such as Pippo Calò, Nitto Santapaola and Giovanni Brusca, and had become well known for the brutality inflicted on the prisoners. The Prodi government decided to close the penitentiary permanently on 28 June 1998. Pianosa was evacuated in a single day by the remaining detainees and residents, leaving a few guards on the island as caretakers.

== Marine protected area ==
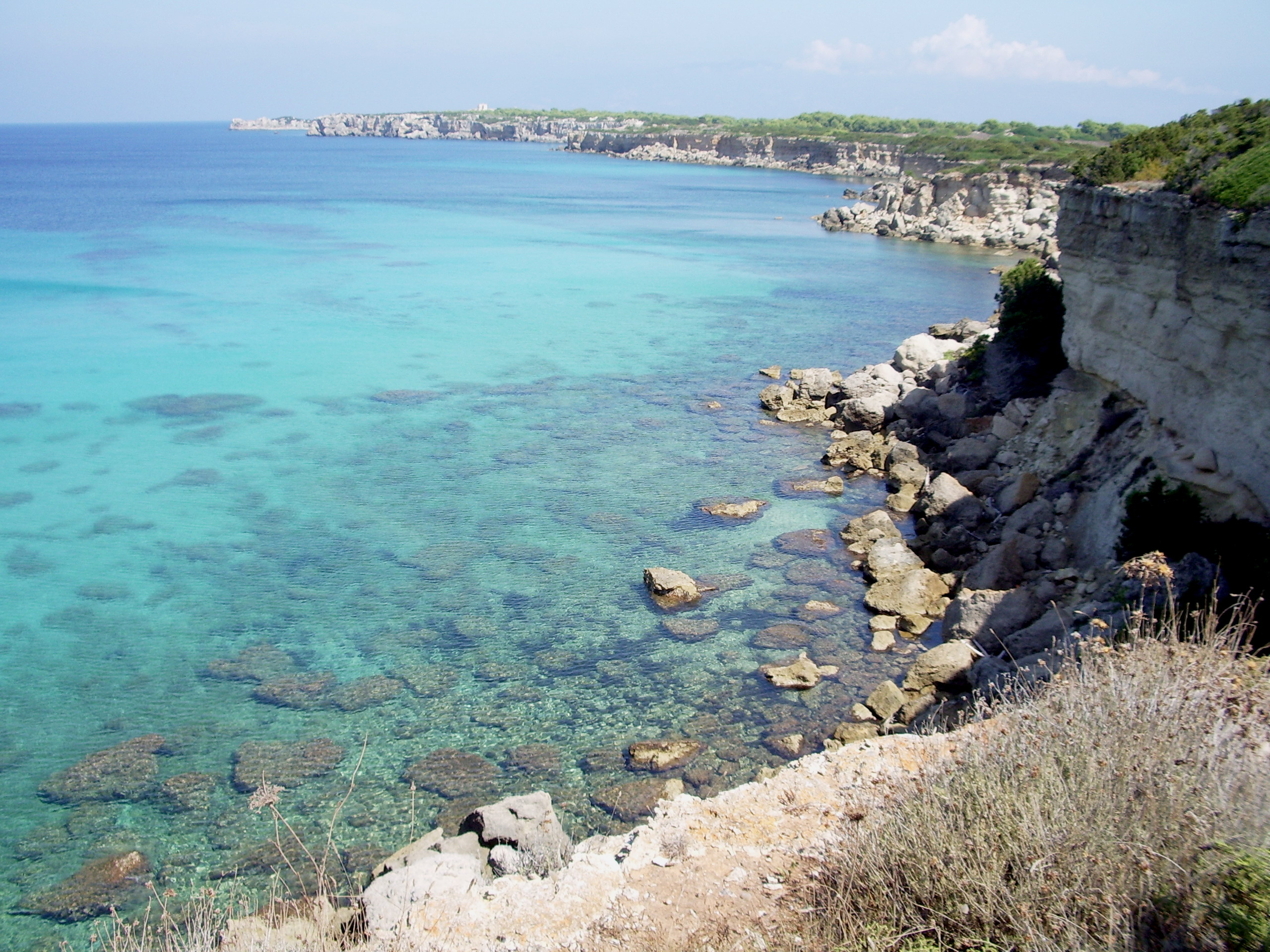
West coast of Pianosa

Pianosa is part of the Arcipelago Toscano National Park, which has been a marine protected area since 1996 to preserve its archaeological and environmental heritage, which had been preserved in the past due to its inaccessibility to tourism.

The island permits visits by only 250 tourists per day, arriving by ferry from the Island of Elba. Fishing, diving, or anchoring are not allowed without a special authorization. During the summer season Pianosa can be reached once a week from Rio Marina and Piombino on the Toremar fleet, twice a week from San Vincenzo and daily from Marina di Campo on the service. It is possible to visit the island, but only with organized excursions or trekking by bicycle escorted by park guides.

== Geographical landmarks ==
- Bagni di Agrippa
- Cala dell’Alga
- Cala Giovanna
- Cala dei Turchi
- Cala San Giovanni
- Cala di Biagio
- Cala del Bruciato
- Cala della Ruta
- Golfo della Botte
- Porto Romano
- Punta del Marchese
- Punta del Grottone
- Punta Secca
- Punta Brigantina
- Punta del Segnale
- Punta del Libeccio
- Punta del Pulpito

== In popular culture ==
Joseph Heller's absurdist anti-war novel Catch-22 is set mostly on Pianosa, at a fictional United States Army Air Forces bomber base during World War II. Heller notes at the beginning of Catch-22 that the real Pianosa is too small to "accommodate all the actions described." One obvious difference is that Heller's "Pianosa" has a small community of Italian villagers, unlike the real island. Heller had been stationed on Corsica between May 1944 and December 1944, and flew 60 combat missions in North American B-25 Mitchell bombers as a bombardier with the 488th Bombardment Squadron (340th Bombardment Group, 57th Bombardment Wing, 12th Air Force).

== See also ==
- List of islands of Italy
- Tuscan Archipelago
- Pianosa Lighthouse
- Battle of Pianosa
