= Arcipelago Toscano National Park =

Italian national park

Parco Nazionale Arcipelago Toscano
- IUCN category II (national park)
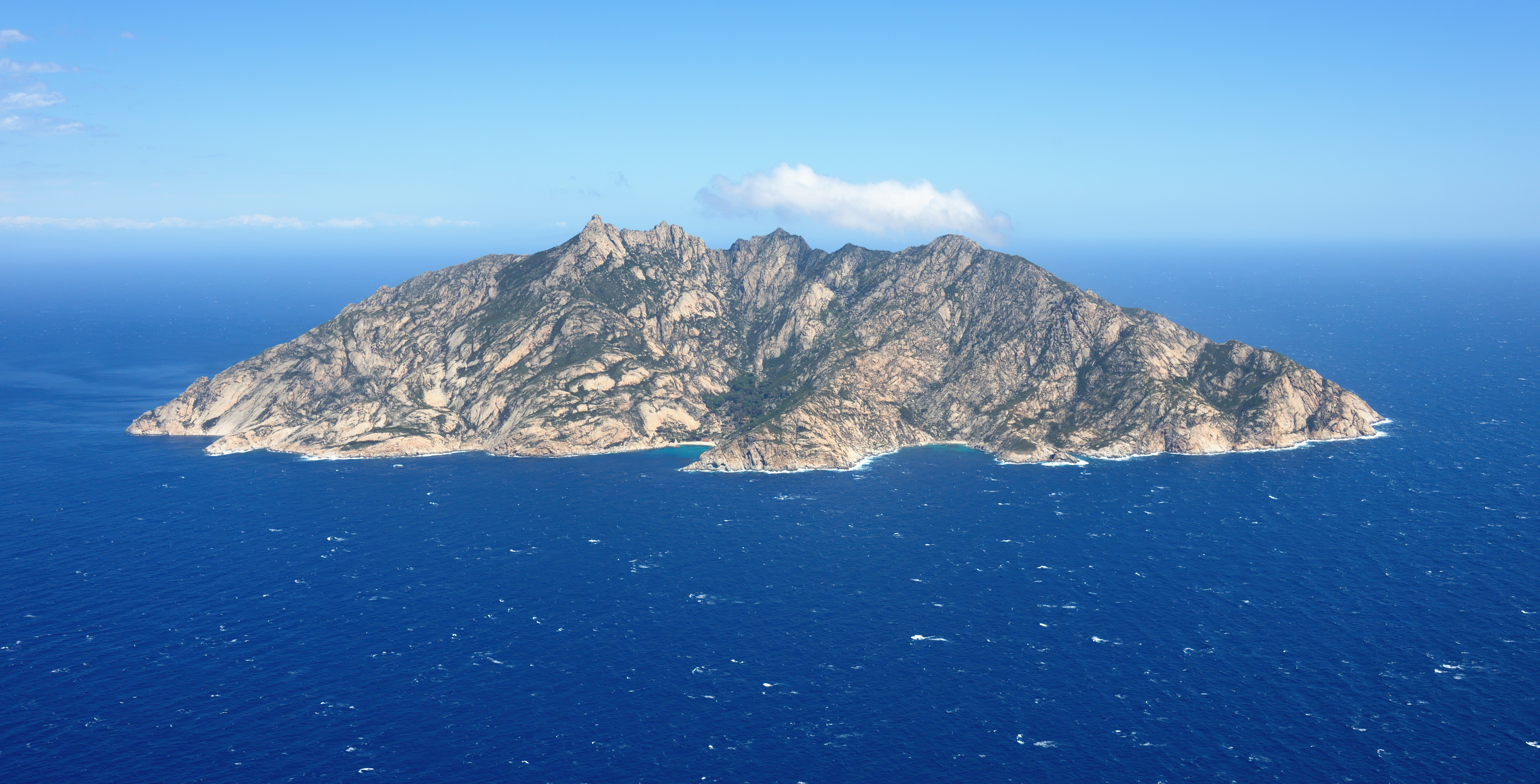
- Montecristo Island, Tuscan Archipelago

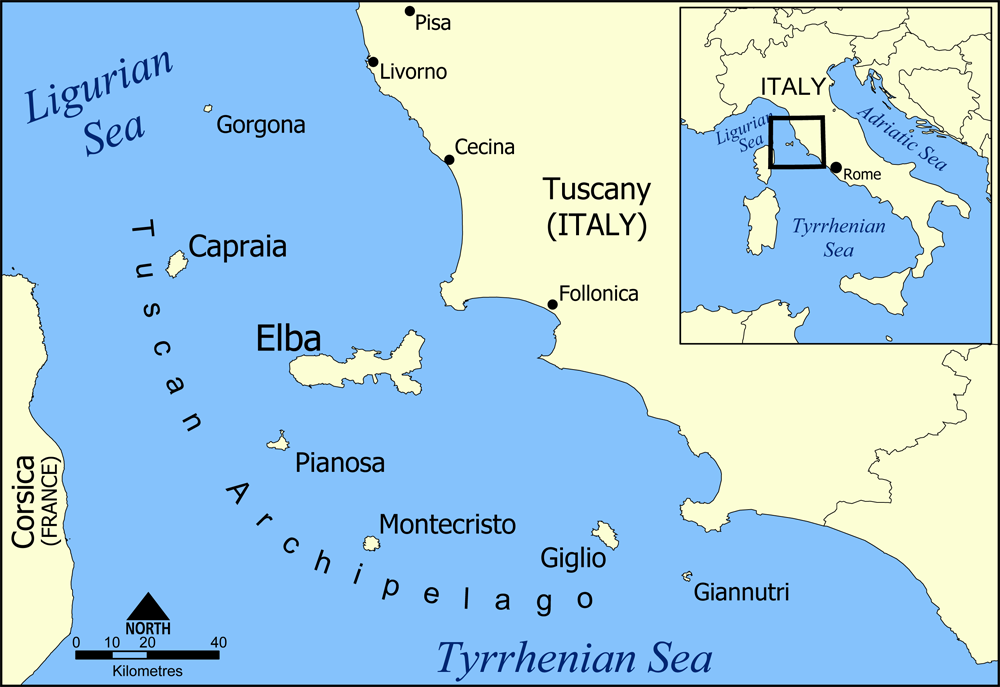
- Location: Tuscan Archipelago
- Nearest city: Portoferraio
- Coordinates: 42°45′N 10°18′E
- Area: 746.63 km^{2} (288.28 sq mi)
- Established: 1996, expanded in 1997
- Governing body: Ministero dell`Ambiente
- Website: www.islepark.it

Arcipelago Toscano National Park is a large Tuscan Archipelago national park and marine park in the Provinces of Grosseto and Livorno, western Tuscany, Italy.

== Geography ==
The Tuscan archipelago (chain of islands) is located between the Ligurian Sea (north) and Tyrrhenian Sea (south), in the Mediterranean Sea.

The Italian national park protects 56,776 hectares (140,300 acres) of sea and 17,887 hectares (44,200 acres) of island (land) habitats.

The Arcipelago Toscano National Park includes the seven main islands (isola) of the Tuscan Archipelago:

- Elba
- Isola del Giglio
- Capraia
- Montecristo
- Pianosa
- Giannutri
- Gorgona
- and some of the minor islands and rock outcrops.

The highest point in the park is Mount Capanne (Italian: Monte Capanne), at 1,019 metres (3,343 ft) in elevation, on the island of Elba.

== See also ==
- List of national parks of Italy
