= Tuscan Archipelago =

Chain of islands between the Ligurian Sea and Tyrrhenian Sea

Coordinates: 42°45′N 10°18′E

Native name: Arcipelago toscano
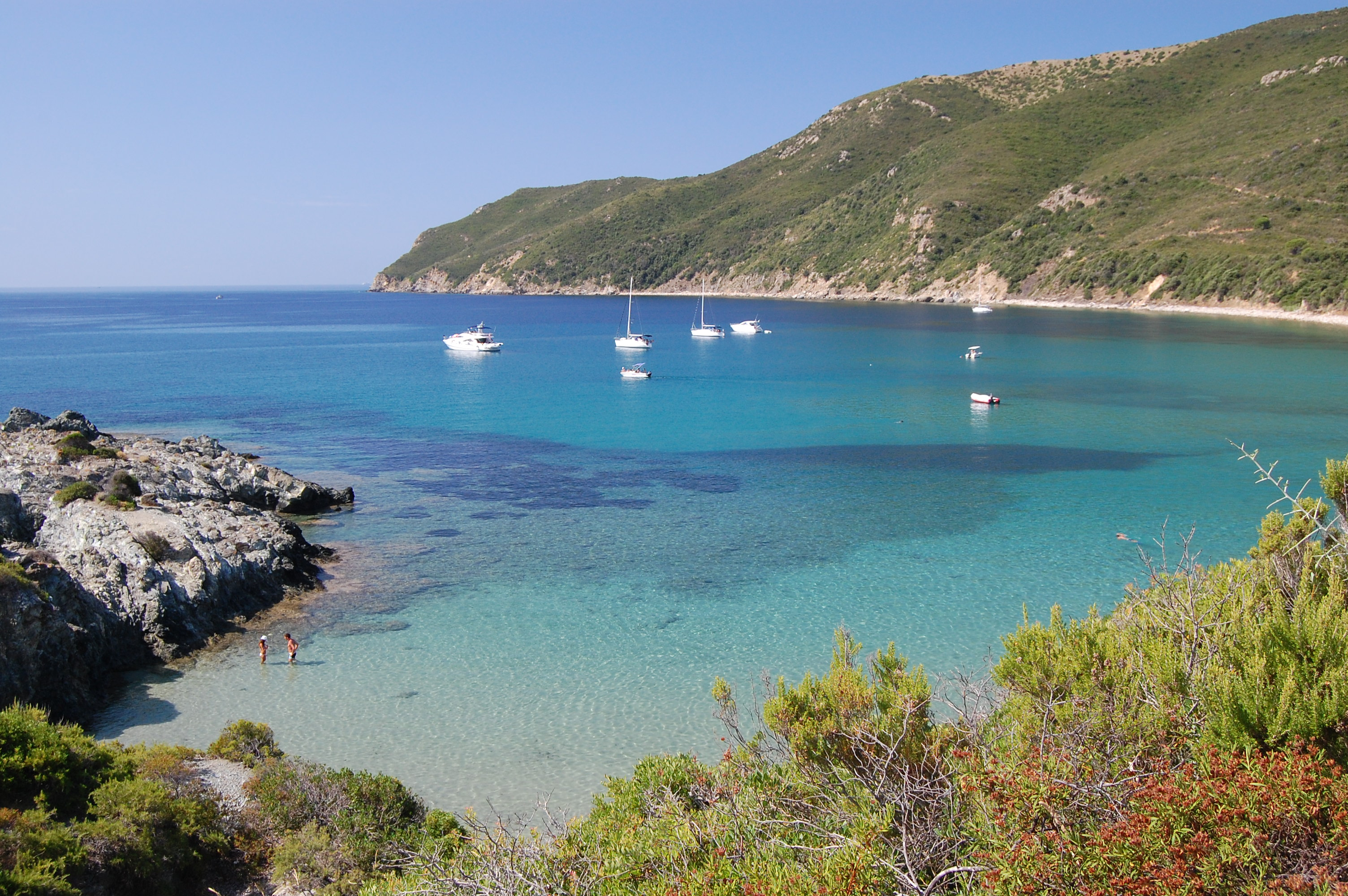
- Elba, the biggest island of the Tuscan Archipelago

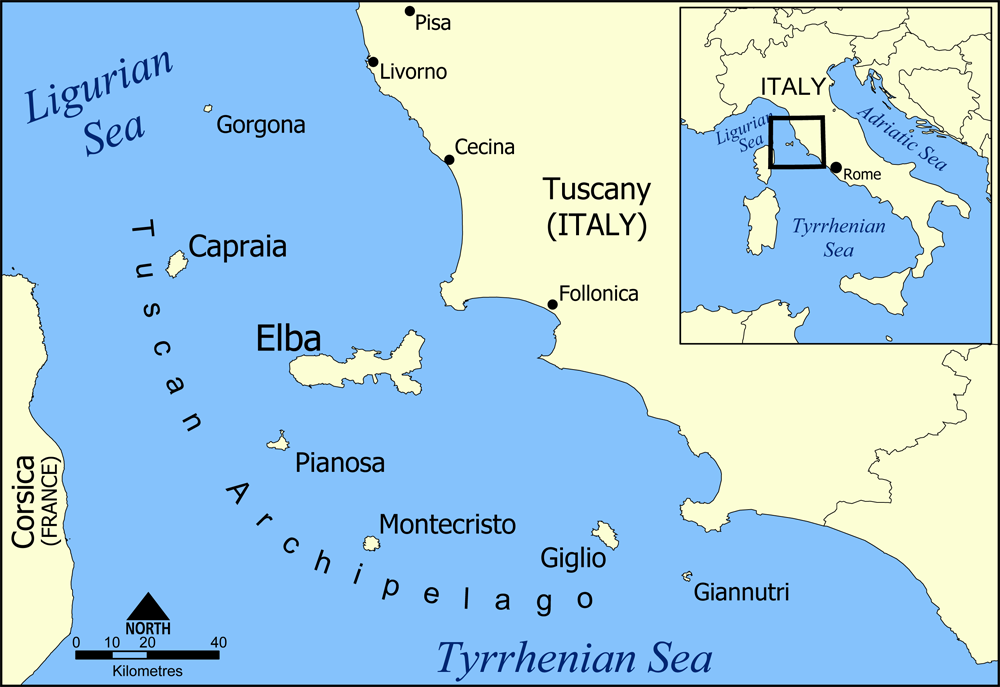
- Map of the Tuscan Archipelago

Geography
- Location: between Ligurian Sea and Tyrrhenian Sea
- Archipelago: Tuscan Archipelago
- Total islands: 7
- Major islands: Elba; Pianosa; Capraia; Montecristo; Giglio; Gorgona; Giannutri
- Area: 295 km^{2} (114 sq mi)
- Highest elevation: 1,018 m (3340 ft)
- Highest point: Monte Capanne

Administration
- Italy
- Region: Tuscany
- Province: Livorno, Grosseto
- Largest settlement: Portoferraio (pop. 12,007)

Demographics
- Population: 34,389
- Pop. density: 108/km^{2} (280/sq mi)

The Tuscan Archipelago (or Etruscan Islands) is a chain of islands between the Ligurian Sea and Tyrrhenian Sea, west of Tuscany, Italy.

The islands' proximity to several major cities has made them a favourite tourist location. History and literature have ensured that most people are familiar with the islands of Elba and Montecristo.

Legends says the archipelago originates from a necklace that Venus, the Roman goddess of beauty and sensuality, lost while emerging from the Tyrrhenian sea. In this myth, the seven islands are the seven pearls the goddess was unable to retrieve.

== Geography ==
The Tuscan Archipelago lies between Corsica and the Tuscan coast and contains seven major islands (Capraia, Elba, Giannutri, Giglio, Gorgona, Montecristo and Pianosa); all are protected as part of the Arcipelago Toscano National Park. The Archipelago extends 166 kilometres (103 mi) from the northernmost island (Gorgona) to the southernmost (Giannutri) and 56 kilometres (35 mi) from the westernmost (Capraia) to the Tuscan coast.

Main Islands (from north to south):

Island	Area in km^{2}	Population 1 January 2016	Distance from mainland Italy
Gorgona	2.23	220	18.6 nautical miles (34.4 km; 21.4 mi)
Capraia	19.30	415	28.2 nautical miles (52.2 km; 32.5 mi)
Elba	223.5	32,290	5.0 nautical miles (9.3 km; 5.8 mi)
Pianosa	10.25	10	26.5 nautical miles (49.1 km; 30.5 mi)
Giglio	21.21	1,442	7.75 nautical miles (14.35 km; 8.92 mi)
Montecristo	10.39	2	34.0 nautical miles (63.0 km; 39.1 mi)
Giannutri	2.60	10	6.3 nautical miles (11.7 km; 7.2 mi)
Other	3.34	0	
Total:	292.82	34,389	

There are several islets in the archipelago including:

- Cerboli (Piombino Channel)
- Formiche di Grosseto (Grosseto)
- Isola della Cappa (Giglio)
- Isola Corbella (Elba)
- Isola di Ortano (Elba)
- Isola della Peraiola (Capraia)
- Isola dei Topi (Piombino Channel)
- Isole Gemini (Elba)
- Isolotto della Scarpa (Pianosa)
- Isolotto della Scola (Pianosa)
- Palmaiola (Piombino Channel)
- Scoglietto di Portoferraio (Elba)

and skerries as:

- Faraglione del Giglio
- Formiche di Capraia (Capraia)
- Formiche della Zanca (Elba)
- Isola dei Liscoli (Elba)
- Le Scole (Giglio)
- Meloria Shoal (Livorno)
- Scoglio d'Africa (Corsica Channel)
- Scoglio Forano (Pianosa)
- Scoglio del Gatto (Capraia)
- Scoglio della Manza (Capraia)
- Scoglio dell’Ogliera (Elba)
- Scoglio del Remaiolo (Elba)
- Scoglio della Triglia (Elba)
- Vada Shoal (Vada)

Others islets and skerries that are not part of the archipelago:

- Argentarola (Monte Argentario)
- Isolotto di Porto Ercole
- Isolotto dello Sparviero
- Scoglio della Focacciola

== Geology ==
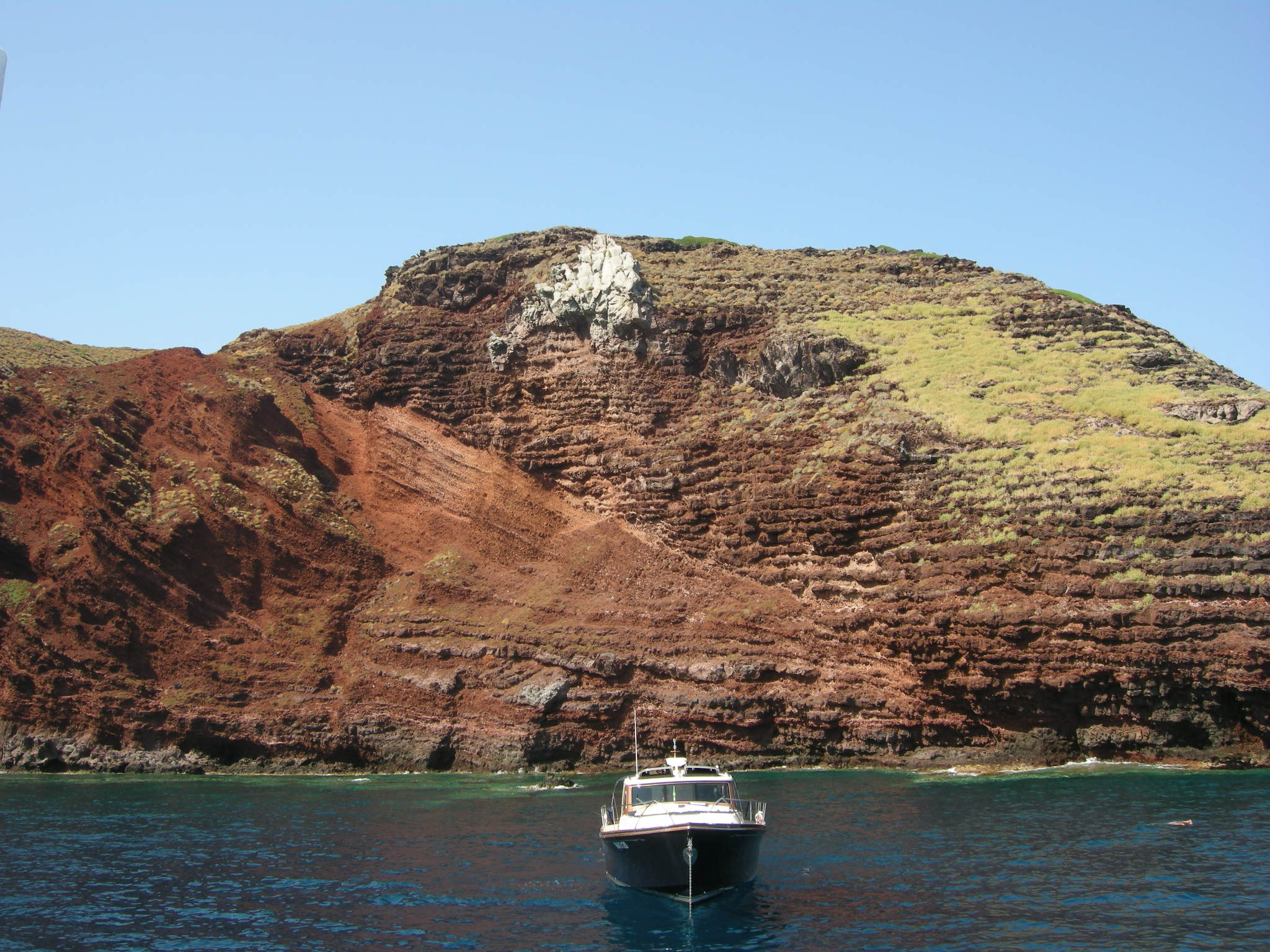
Capraia has a volcanic origin

The Tuscan Archipelago represents a region of correlation between the Sardinia-Corsica block and the Italian Peninsula; it is formed by seven islands and several islets and skerries which have different geological provenance as magmatic, sedimentary and metamorphic rocks. The origin of the archipelago dates to the Triassic period according to the type of the rocks.

In the Quaternary the archipelago was related to the sea level fluctuations due to the glacial and interglacial periods; in the last glaciation the sea level fell 100 metres (330 feet), and Elba became a peninsula joined to the continent and to Pianosa. The Würm glaciation was followed by a warming phase, and the sea rose slowly to reach its current level.

== Biodiversity ==
=== Fauna ===
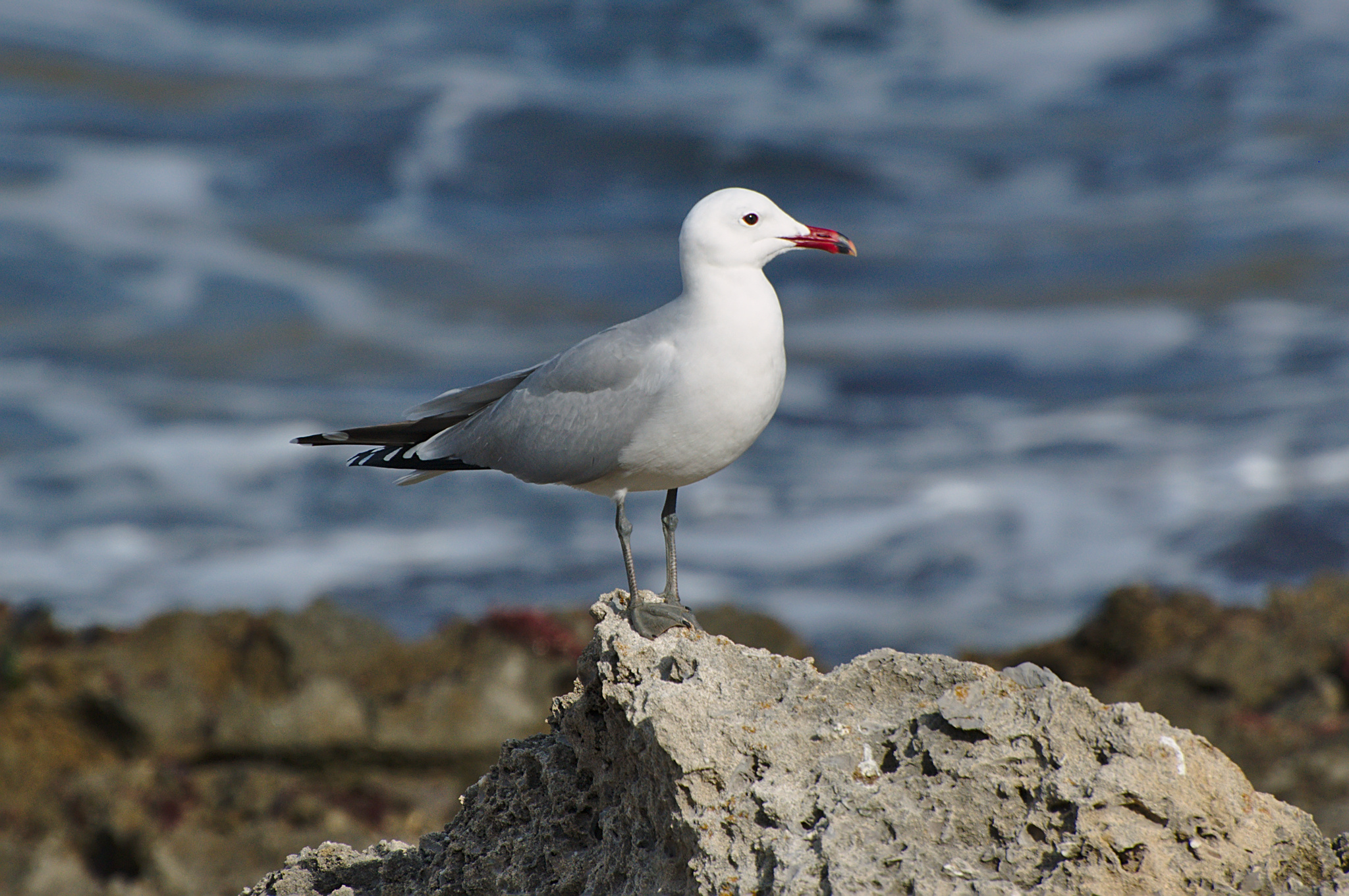
Audouin's gull

The archipelago is distinguished by some endemic taxa which are protected in order to avoid the loss of the biodiversity of fauna and flora. The most important are Oxychilus pilula of Capraia; and Oxychilus gorgonianus of Gorgona; Coenonympha corinna, Podarcis muralis colosi and Vipera aspis francisciredi of Elba; and Vipera aspis montecristi of Montecristo. 31 species of mammals, several introduced, are known from the Tuscan archipelago, with the greatest diversity on Elba, with 24 species. The introduction of the wild boar to Elba several years ago has caused problems regarding the conservation of some plant species.

All the islands of the Tuscan Archipelago are a place where the migrant birds take a stop along their seasonal movement from north to south and vice versa; the favourite places are Gorgona, Palmaiola, Cerboli and Montecristo. The Falco peregrinus brookei nests on Elba and Capraia, the shearwater and the rare Audouin's gull are common on all the islands. The archipelago has been recognised as an Important Bird Area (IBA) by BirdLife International because it supports breeding populations of European nightjars, Scopoli's shearwaters, European shags, Audouin's gulls, Peregrine falcons, Moltoni's warblers, Marmora's warblers, Dartford warblers and black-eared wheatears.

The rich productivity of the coastal waters provides habitats for various marine life, even dolphins and whales, including fin and sperm whales.

=== Flora ===
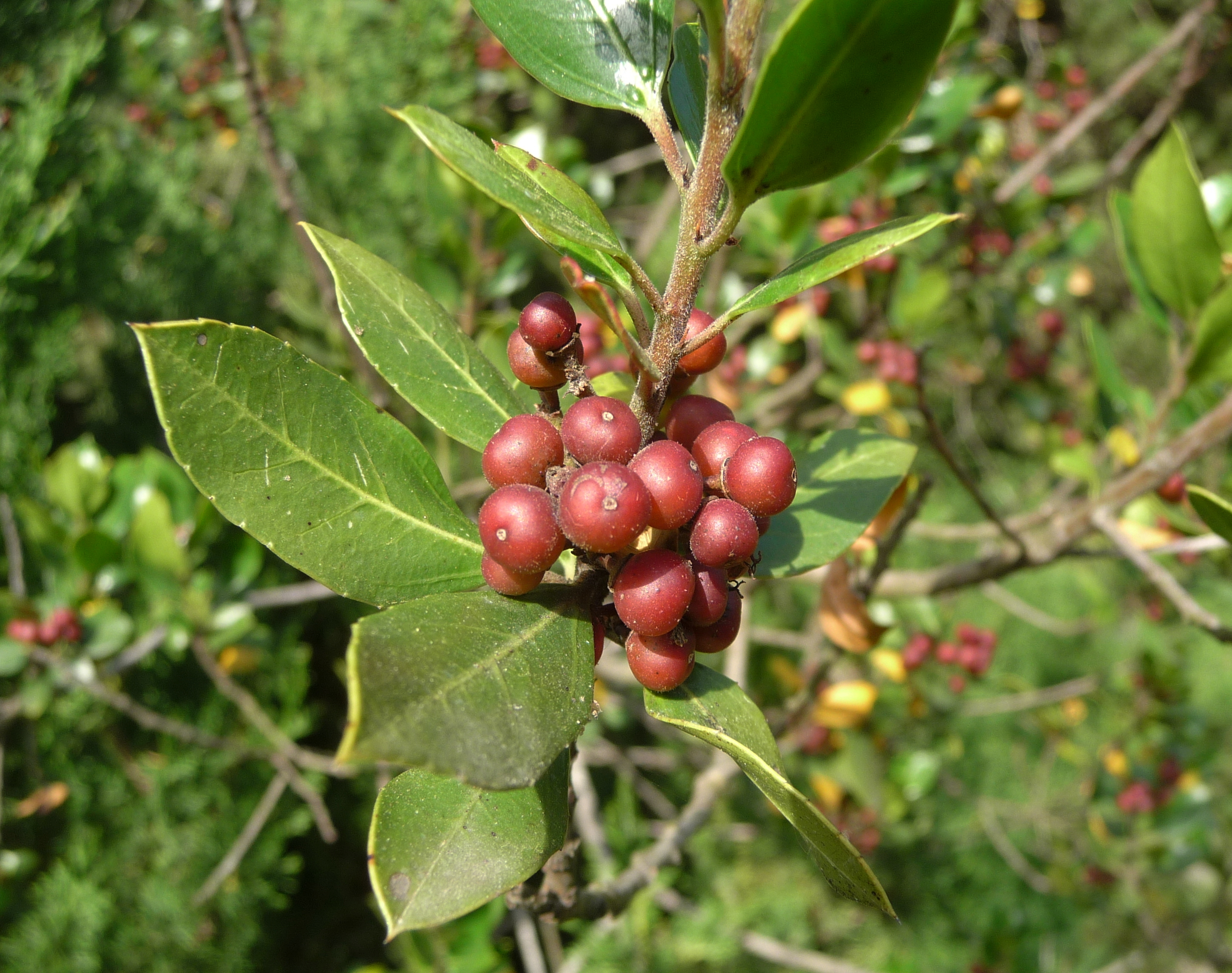
Mediterranean buckthorn

The archipelago is characterized by a Mediterranean climate with high insolation all year round. The archipelago's flora differs from island to island; the smaller have a vegetation similar each other of macchia mediterranea and garrigue formed by evergreen plants. Elba has a complex orography including the mountain Mount Capanne which favoured the preservation of the chestnut, the holm oak and the black alder mostly on the northern side.

The main plant formations are those of shrubs of Erica, strawberry tree, Genisteae, mastic, Mediterranean buckthorn, myrtus and Phoenician juniper; On Elba and Capraia the cork oak is present, while the Aleppo pine and the maritime pine are widely spread on Elba and Gorgona.

The endemic species of the archipelago are Centaurea aetalieae (eastern Elba), Centaurea gymnocarpa (Capraia), Centaurea ilvensis (western Elba), Crocus ilvensis (western Elba), Limonium doriae (Formica Grande), Limonium gorgonae (Gorgona), Limonium ilvae (Elba), Limonium planesiae (Pianosa), Limonium sommerierianum (Giglio, Giannutri and Montecristo), Linaria capraria (all main islands except for Giannutri), Romulea insularis (Capraia) and Silene capraria (Capraia). Endemic taxa of lower rank are Biscutella pichiana subsp. ilvensis (Elba), Festuca gamisansii subsp. aethaliae (Elba), Mentha requienii subsp. bistaminata (Montecristo and Capraia) and Viola corsica subsp. ilvensis (Elba).

== Islands ==
=== Elba ===
Elba is a Mediterranean island in Tuscany, Italy, 10 kilometres (6.2 mi) from the coastal town of Piombino. The largest island of the Tuscan Archipelago, Elba is also part of the Arcipelago Toscano National Park and the third largest island in Italy, after Sicily and Sardinia. It is located in the Tyrrhenian Sea, about 50 kilometres (30 mi) east of the French island of Corsica.

=== Giglio ===
Isola del Giglio is an Italian island and comune situated in the Tyrrhenian Sea, off the coast of Tuscany, and is part of the Province of Grosseto. The island is one of seven that form the Tuscan Archipelago, lying within the Arcipelago Toscano National Park. Giglio means "lily" in Italian, and though the name would appear consistent with the insignia of Medici Florence, it derives from Aegilium, "Goat Island", a Latin transliteration of the Greek word for "little goat" (Ancient greek: Aigýllion, Αιγύλλιον).

=== Capraia ===
Capraia is an Italian island, is the north-westernmost of the seven islands of the Tuscan Archipelago, and the third largest after Elba and Giglio; it is also a comune (municipality) belonging to the Province of Livorno. The island has a population of about 400.

=== Montecristo ===
Montecristo is an island in the Tyrrhenian Sea and part of the Tuscan Archipelago. Administratively it belongs to the municipality of Portoferraio in the province of Livorno, Italy. The island has an area of 10.39 km^{2} (4.01 sq mi) and is approximately 4.3 km (2.7 mi) wide at its widest point; the coasts are steep, and extend for 16 km (9.9 mi). The island is a state nature reserve and forms part of the Tuscan Archipelago National Park.

=== Pianosa ===
The small island of Pianosa, about 10.25 km^{2} (3.96 sq mi) in area, has a coastal perimeter of 26 km (16 mi), forms part of Italy's Tuscan Archipelago in the Tyrrhenian Sea.

=== Gorgona ===
Gorgona is the northernmost island in the Tuscan Archipelago. Between Corsica and Livorno, this diminutive island has been valued most for its wildlife, especially marine birds, and its isolation. The latter quality resulted in the foundation of Gorgona Abbey in the Middle Ages. After its closure, the monastery grounds and buildings were appropriated in 1869, at the foundation of an agricultural penal colony, which is currently in use.

=== Giannutri ===
Giannutri is a small island in the Tyrrhenian Sea off the coast of Tuscany, Italy; it is the southernmost island of the Tuscan Archipelago and it is a frazione of the comune of Isola del Giglio in the Province of Grosseto.

== Islets ==
=== Formiche di Grosseto ===
The Formiche di Grosseto ("Ants of Grosseto") is a group of islets which emerge sharply in the Tuscan Archipelago. They are located in open sea among the coast of the Natural Park of Maremma and Pianosa, approximately 13 nautical miles (24 km) from Porto Santo Stefano on Monte Argentario and 9.4 miles (15.1 km) from Marina di Grosseto; they are part of the comune of Grosseto and are placed in a nature reserve which makes part of a special protection area.

=== Palmaiola ===
Palmaiola is an islet placed in the middle of Piombino Channel, at 3 kilometres (1.9 mi) from Elba and 7 kilometres (4.3 mi) from Piombino; it is part of the comune of Rio Marina.

== Skerries ==
=== Meloria ===
Meloria is a rocky skerry, surrounded by a shoal, off the Tuscan coast, in the Ligurian Sea, 3.5 miles (5.6 kilometres) north-west of Livorno.

=== Scoglietto di Portoferraio ===
Scoglietto di Portoferraio is a rocky skerry without vegetation placed in front of Portoferraio. It is a marine protected area since 1971, and from January 2014 it is a Site of Community Importance. The skerry is 150 metres (490 ft) long and 124 metres (407 ft) wide and it is placed at 1.36 kilometres (0.85 mi) from Punta Capo Bianco and 1.14 kilometres (0.71 mi) from Punta Falconaia. On the islet is an active lighthouse.

=== Scoglio d'Africa ===
Scoglio d'Africa (or Scoglio d'Affrica), also named Formica di Monte Cristo ("Monte Cristo's Ant"), is a solitary small skerry belonging to the Tuscan Archipelago located in open sea between Tyrrhenian Sea and Corsica Channel. It is located 18.5 kilometres (11.5 miles) west of the Island of Montecristo, 23.5 kilometres (14.6 miles) south of Pianosa Island and 43.1 kilometres (26.8 miles) east of Corsica. Administratively it belongs to the municipality of Campo nell'Elba. It is also part of the Tuscan Archipelago National Park.

== Gallery ==
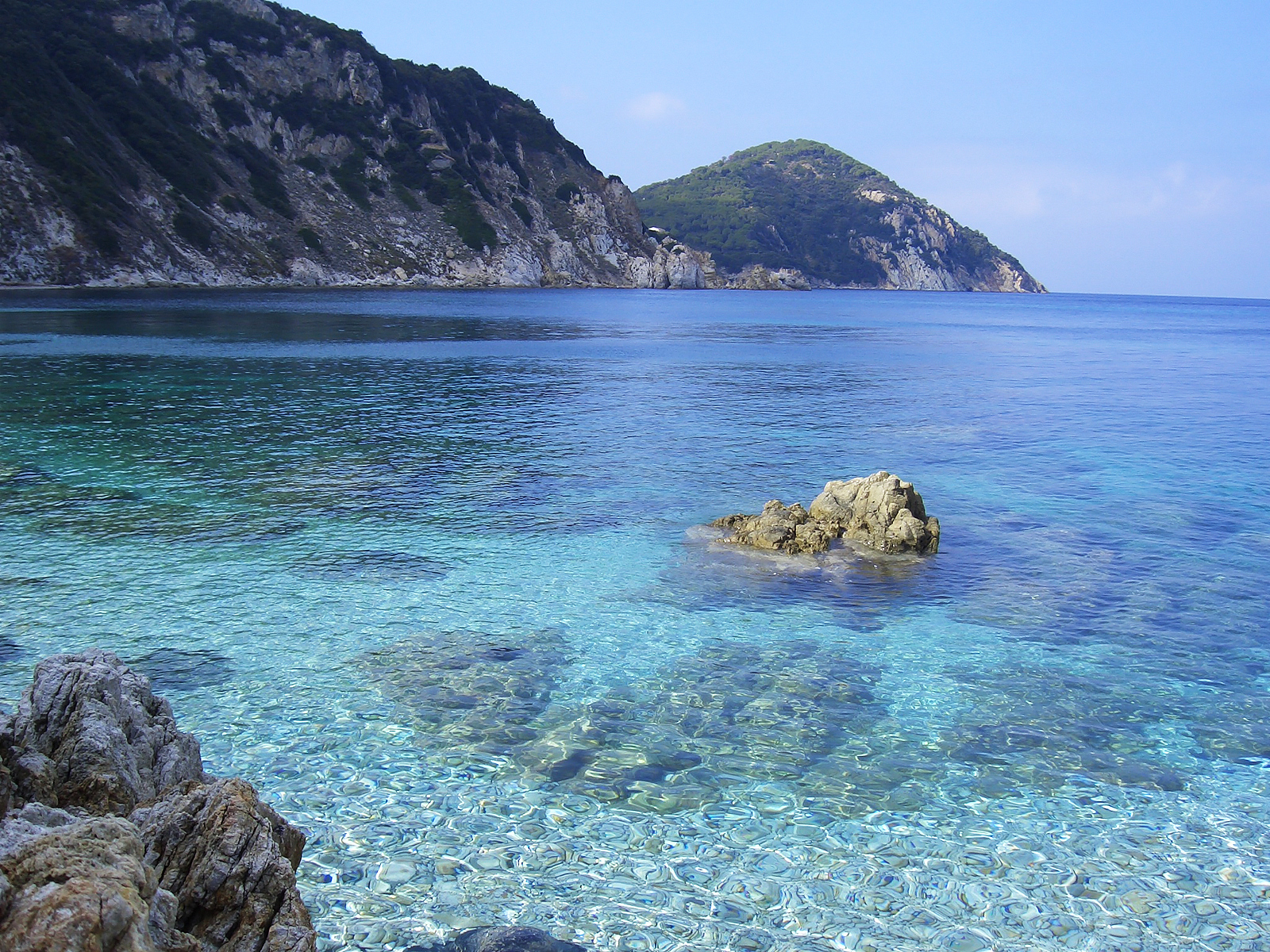
L'Enfola, Elba island

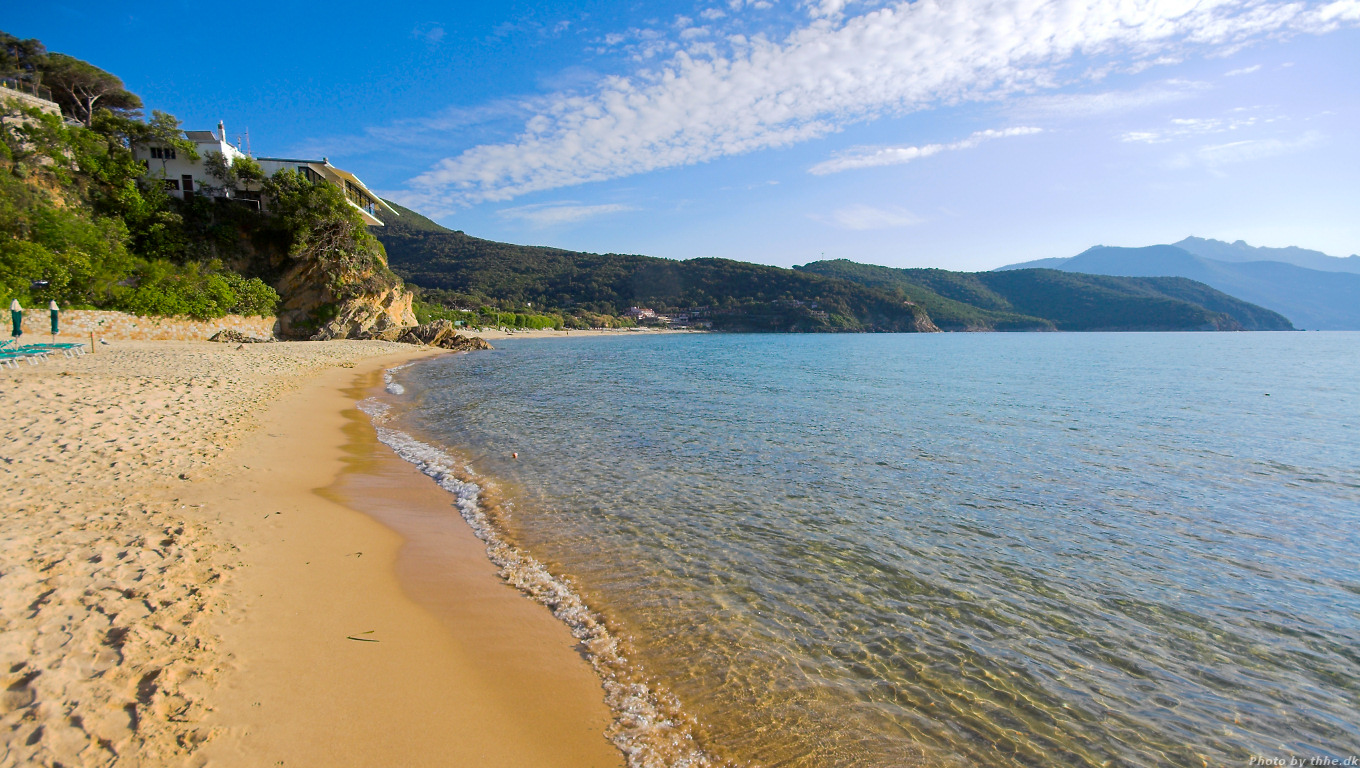
Scaglieri beach, Elba island

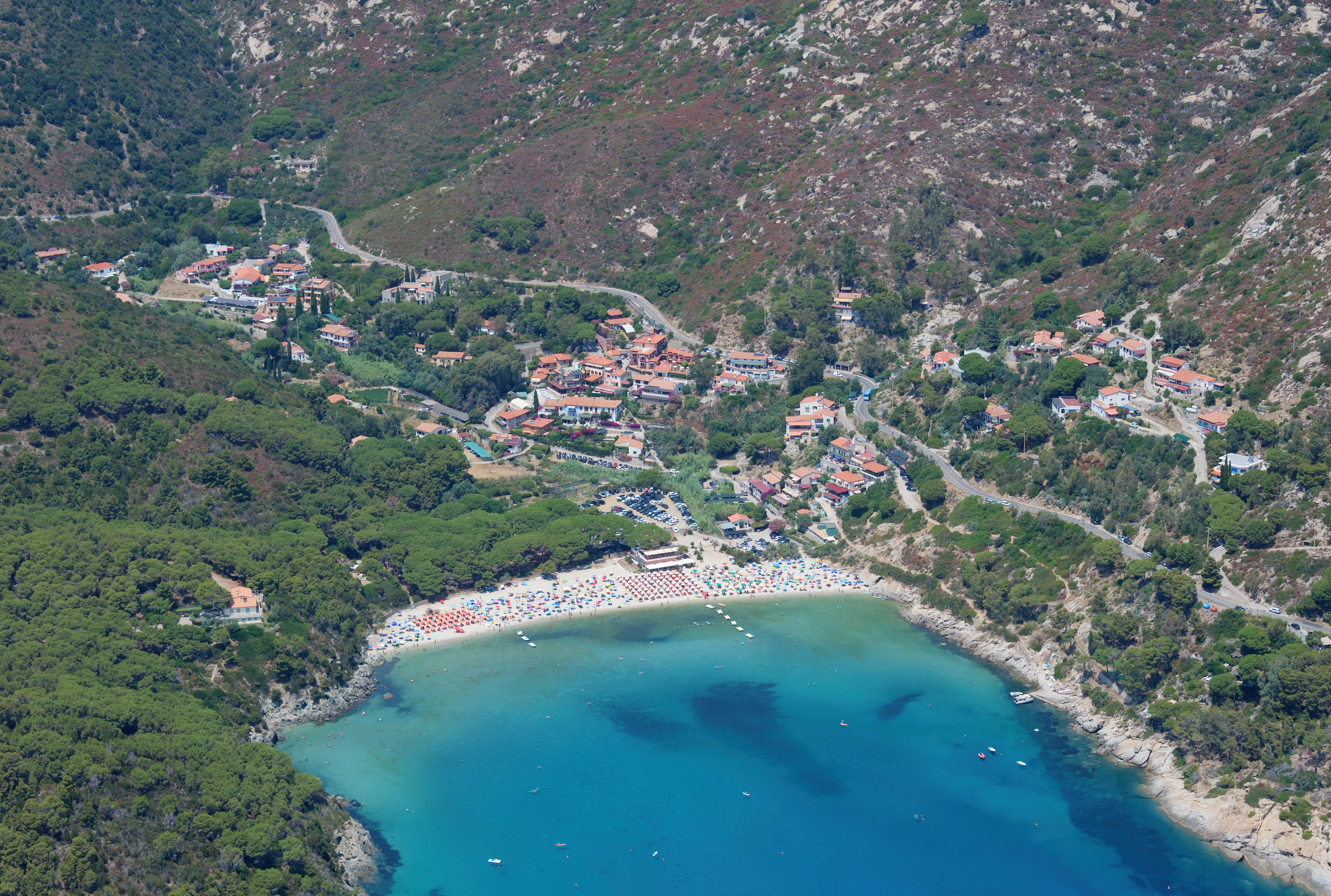
Fetovaia beach, Elba island

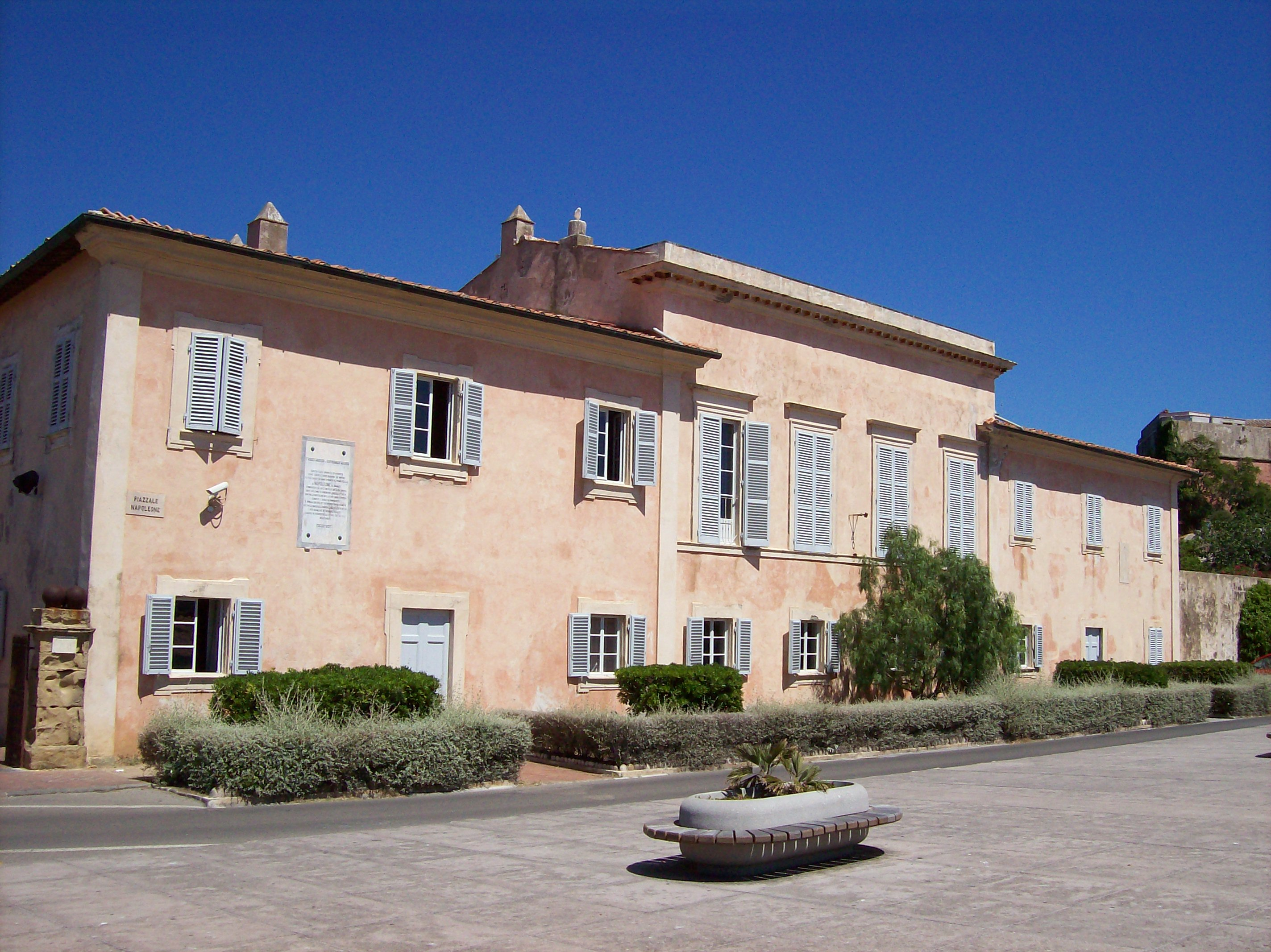
Napoleon's house in Portoferraio

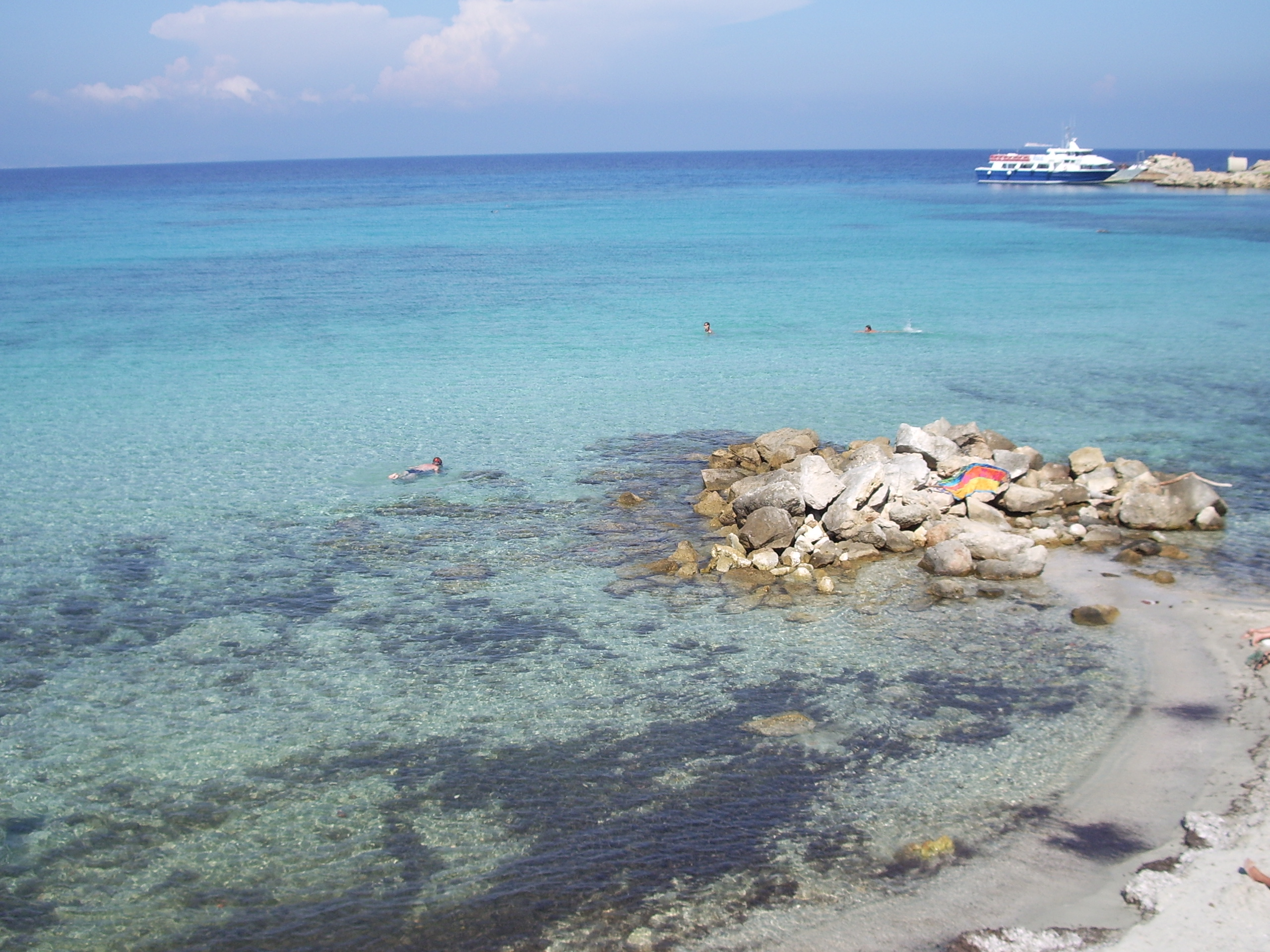
Cala Giovanna, Pianosa island

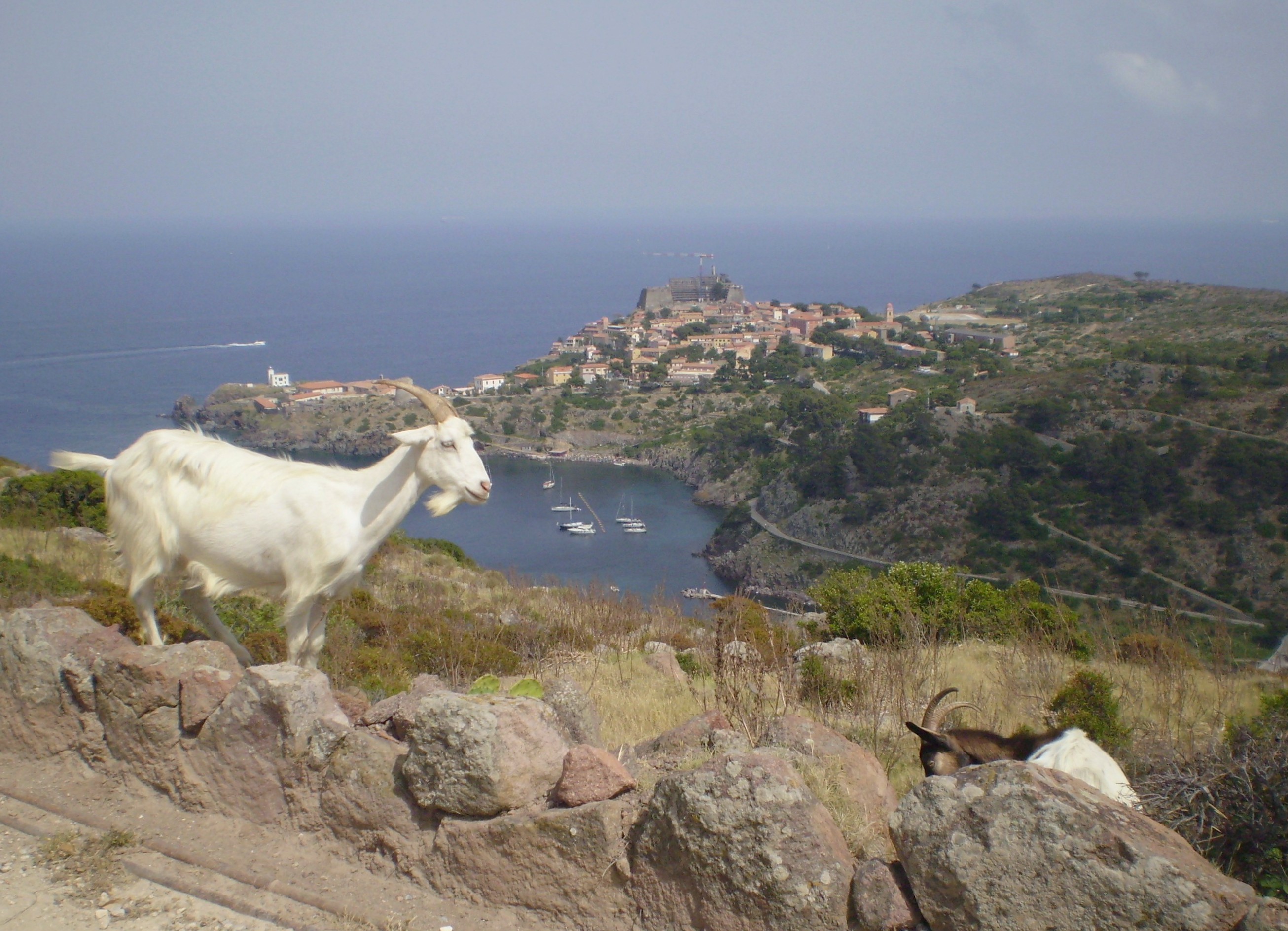
Capraia main village, Capraia island

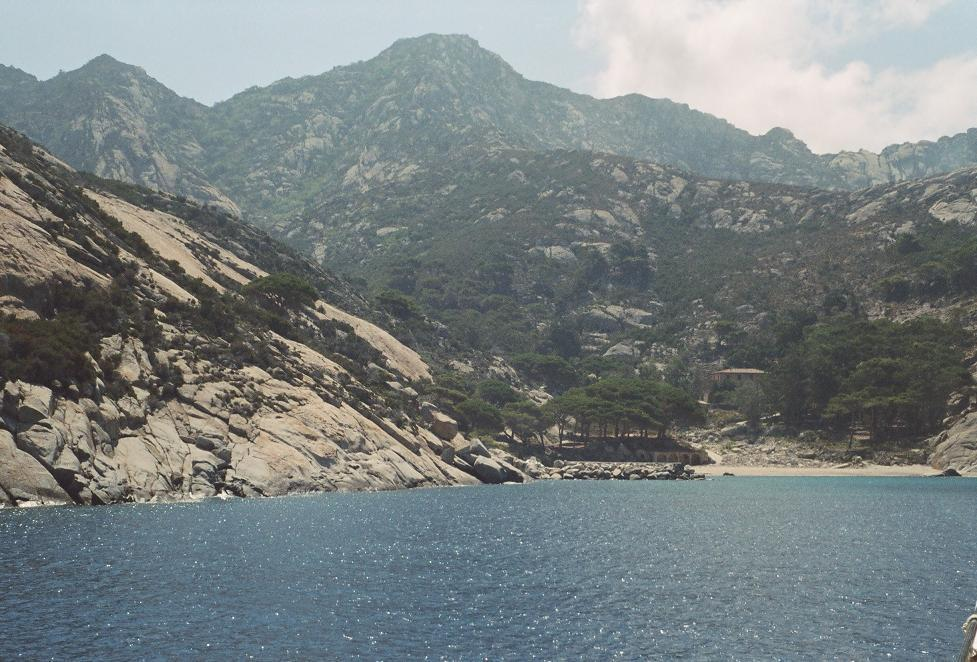
Montecristo Island

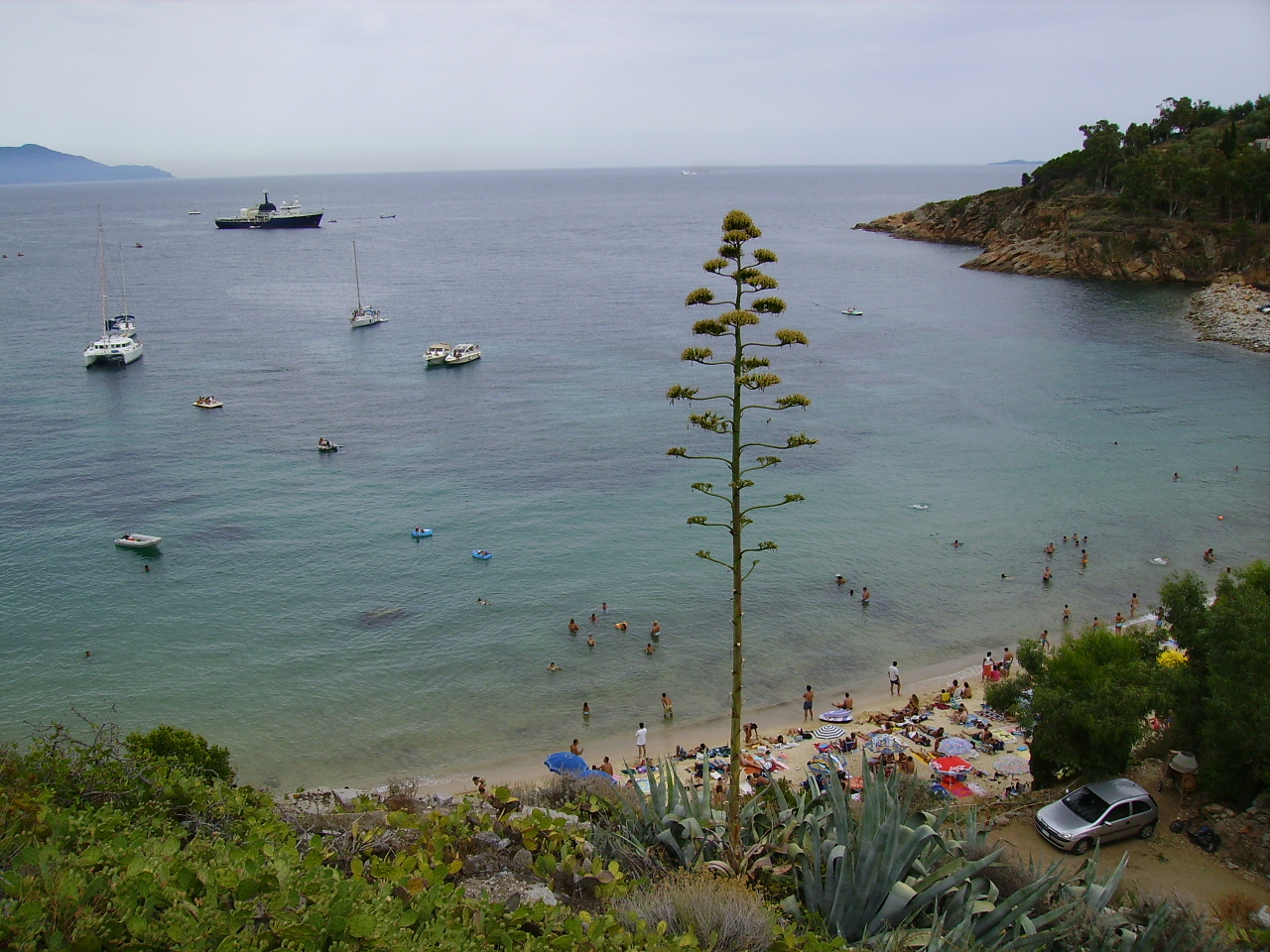
Cannelle beach, Giglio island

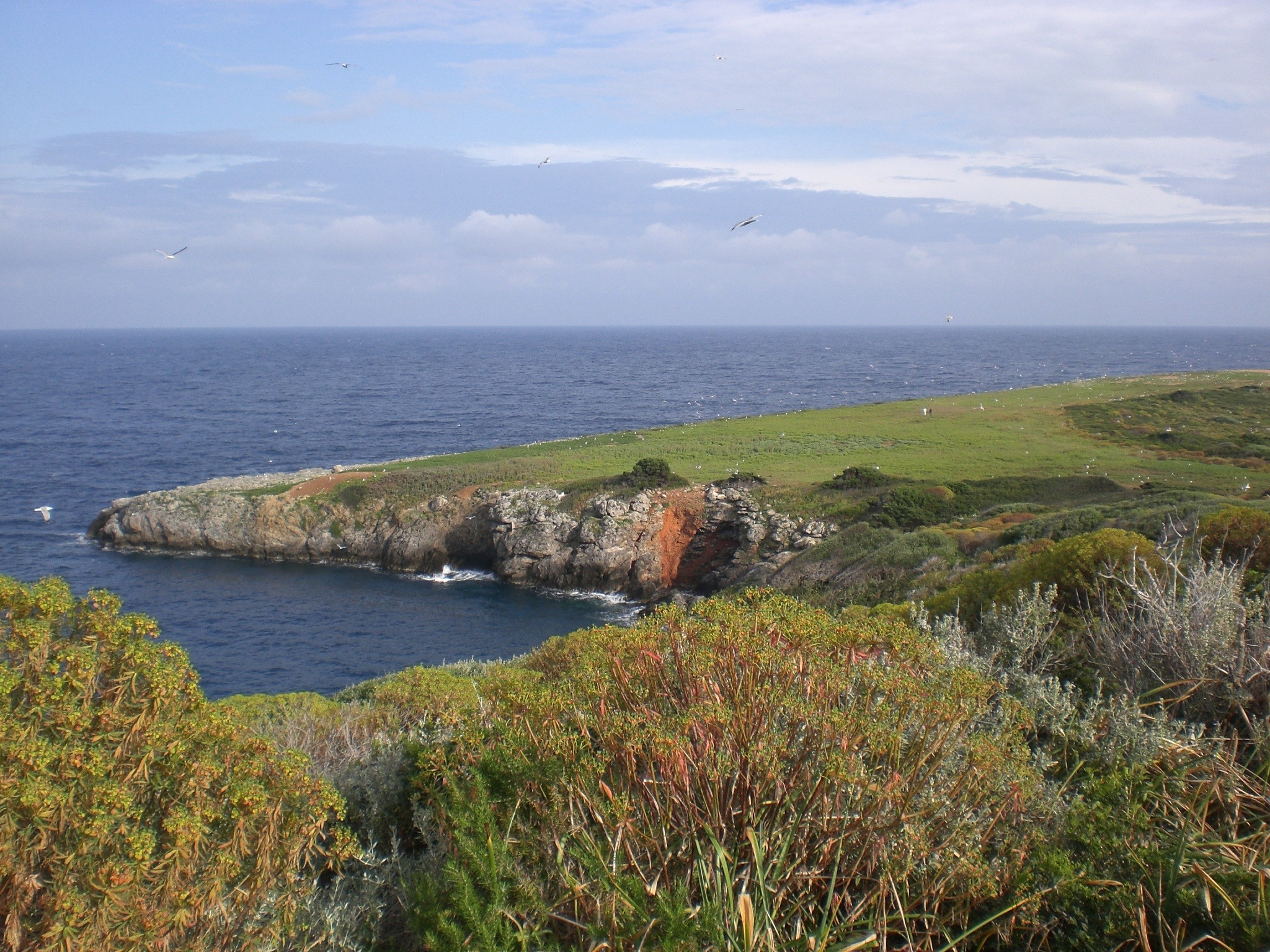
Giannutri coast

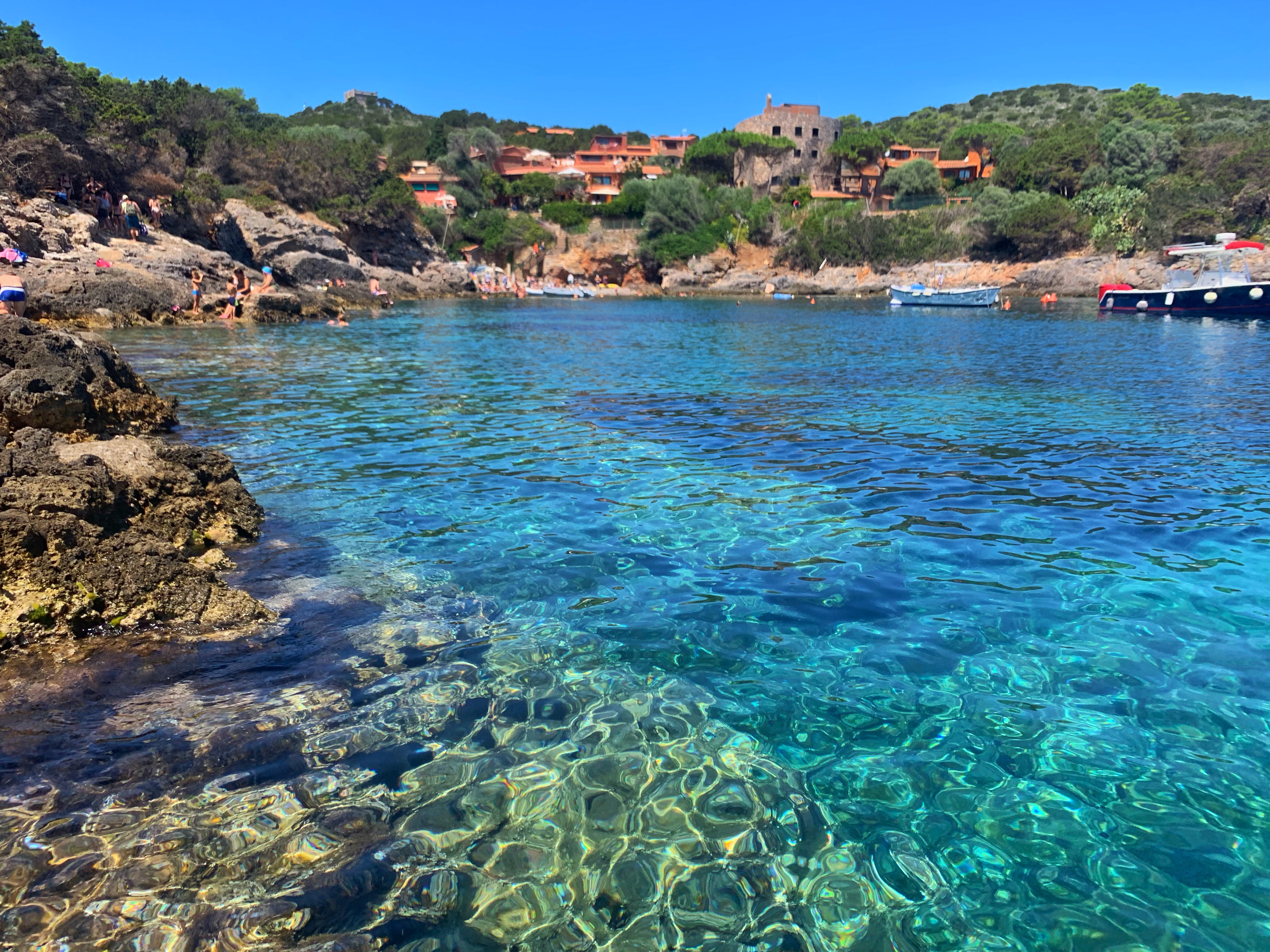
Cala Spalmatoio, Giannutri island

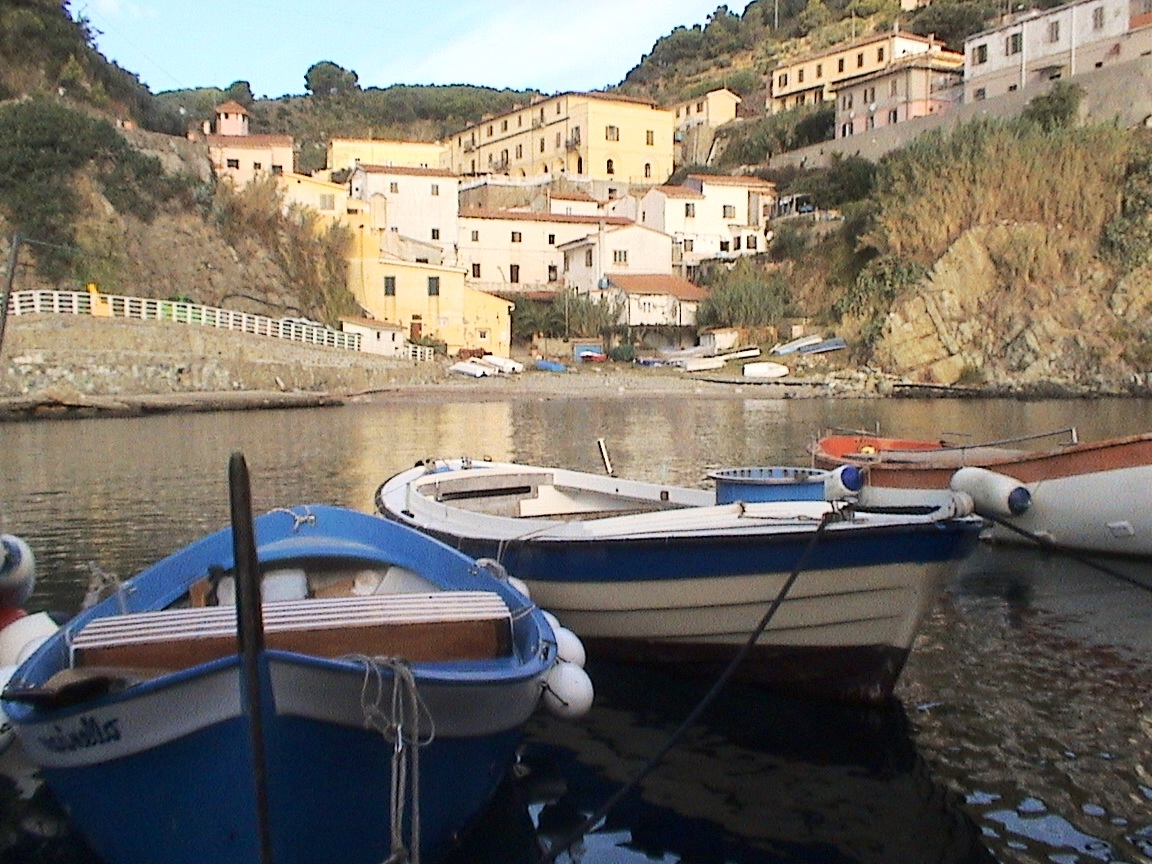
The village of Gorgona seen from the harbour

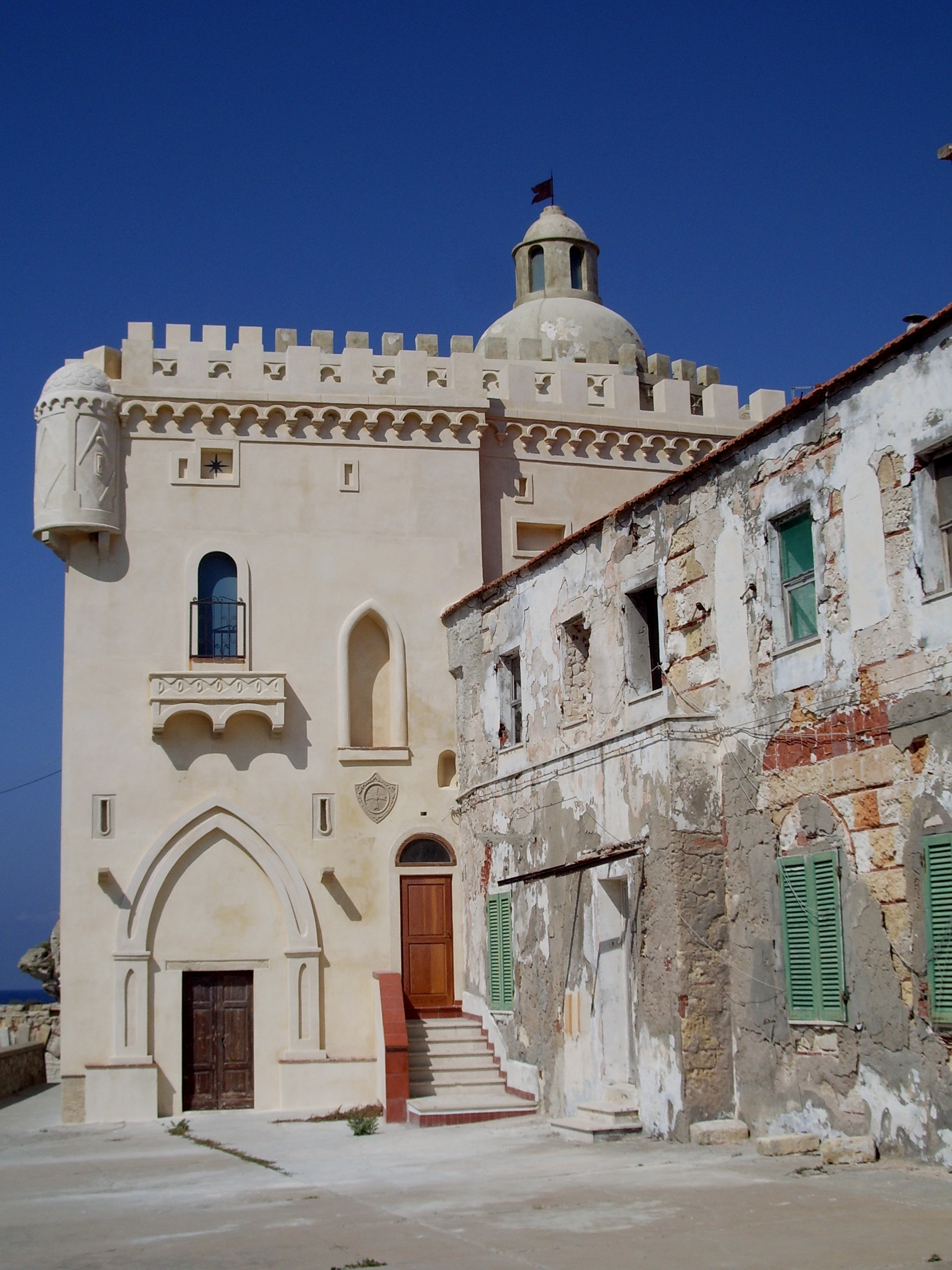
Palazzo della Specola, Pianosa island

== See also ==
- List of islands of Italy
