= List of islands of Italy =

Map of Italian islands

This is a list of islands of Italy. There are nearly 450 islands in Italy, including islands in the Mediterranean Sea (including the marginal seas: Adriatic Sea, Ionian Sea, Libyan Sea, Ligurian Sea, Sea of Sardinia, Tyrrhenian Sea, and inland islands in lakes and rivers. The largest island is Sicily with an area of 25,711 km^{2} (9,927 sq mi). The outlying islands of Italy make up an official region of Insular Italy with an area of 49,801 km^{2} (19,228 sq mi).

== Insular Italy ==
Italy has a coastline and border of 7,600 km (4,700 mi) on the Mediterranean Sea. The following sections list the islands by coastal region, major island, lagoon, or archipelago.

=== Adriatic coast of Apulia ===
- Faraglioni di Baia dei Mergoli

41°44′48″N 16°08′47″E

- Isola di Campi

41°48′54″N 16°12′00″E

=== Calabria ===
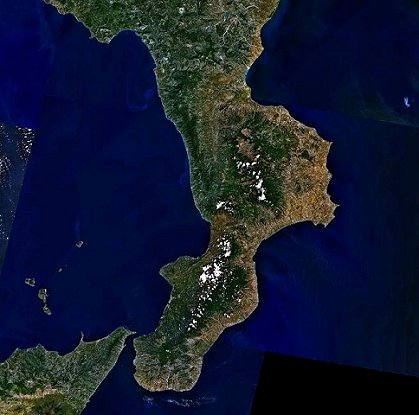
Calabria

Islands off the coast of Calabria include:

- Cirella - 39°41′56″N 15°48′07″E
- Coreca Reefs - 39°05′41″N 16°04′49″E
- Isola di Dino (uninhabited) - 39°52′26″N 15°46′30″E
- Formiche Skerries - 38°39′35″N 15°50′43″E
- Galea Skerries - 38°36′22″N 15°50′59″E
- Galera Skerries - 39°59′53″N 16°36′41″E
- Godano Skerry - 38°38′20″N 15°49′34″E
- Grilla Skerry -40°01′12″N 16°36′26″E
- Incudine Skerry - 39°58′50″N 16°37′04″E
- Isca Skerries - 39°08′52″N 16°03′27″E
- Monaca Skerry - 38°43′38″N 16°01′11″E
- Oremus Skerries - 39°37′17″N 15°50′49″E
- Palombaro Skerry - 38°41′06″N 15°55′11″E
- Pietra Galera Skerry - 38°20′25″N 15°49′47″E
- Pietra Grande Skerry - 38°45′11″N 16°34′03″E
- Ringa Skerries, 38°41′04″N 15°55′01″E
- Safò Skerries - 38°43′19″N 16°03′57″E
- Regina Skerries, 39°28′07″N 15°58′13″E
- Santo Ianni - 39°58′02″N 15°42′57″E
- Cervaro Skerry - 40°04′38″N 16°36′19″E
- Scorzone Skerry - 39°51′24″N 15°47′20″E
- Riaci Skerries, 38°40′17″N 15°52′07″E
- Trachini Skerry, 38°22′45″N 15°51′23″E
- Ulivo Skerry - 38°22′53″N 15°51′25″E
- Vrace Skerry - 38°43′38″N 16°01′17″E

=== Campanian Archipelago ===
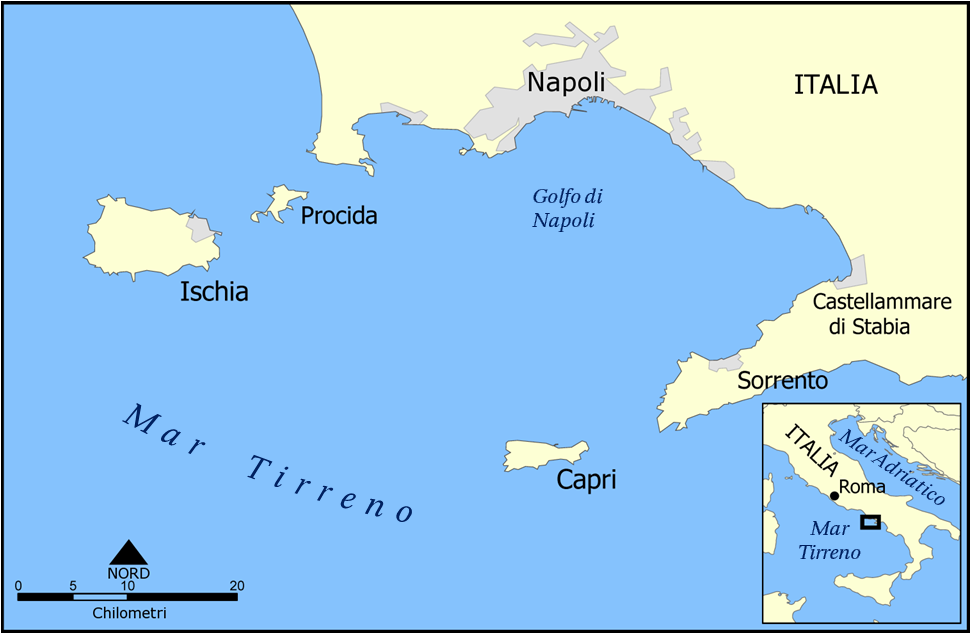
Flegrean Islands

Islands in the Campanian Archipelago include:

- Flegrean Isles
  - Capri - 40°33′00″N 14°14′00″E
    - Capri Faraglioni rocks - 40°32′24″N 14°15′11″E
    - Monacone Skerry - 40°32′37″N 14°15′24″E
    - Unghia Marina Skerry - 40°32′44″N 14°14′43″E
  - Ischia (8th largest island at 46 km^{2} (18 sq mi)) - 40°43′52″N 13°53′45″E
    - Aragonese Castle - 40°43′54″N 13°57′53″E
    - La Nave Skerry - 40°42′26″N 13°51′13″E
    - Lorio Skerry - 40°44′07″N 13°51′08″E
    - Sant'Anna Skerries - 40°43′37″N 13°57′40″E
    - Levante Skerry - 40°47′41″N 14°10′00″E
    - Ponente Skerry - 40°47′53″N 14°09′37″E
- Gaiola - 40°47′30″N 14°11′13″E
- Li Galli - 40°34′52″N 14°25′59″E
  - Castelluccia Islet - 40°34′54″N 14°25′47″E
  - Il Gallo Lungo - 40°34′57″N 14°26′07″E
  - Nisida - 40°47′43″N 14°09′48″E
  - Rotonda Islet - 40°34′48″N 14°25′48″E
- Isola Licosa - 40°15′05″N 14°54′01″E
- Megaride - 40°49′41″N 14°14′54″E
- Pennata - 40°47′32″N 14°05′19″E
- Procida - 40°45′30″N 14°01′00″E
  - Vivara - 40°44′40″N 13°59′37″E
- Rovigliano Skerry - 40°43′46″N 14°27′49″E
- San Martino - 40°47′56″N 14°02′12″E
- Vervece Skerry - 40°37′08″N 14°19′29″E
- Vetara Skerry - 40°35′00″N 14°23′51″E

=== Cheradi Islands ===
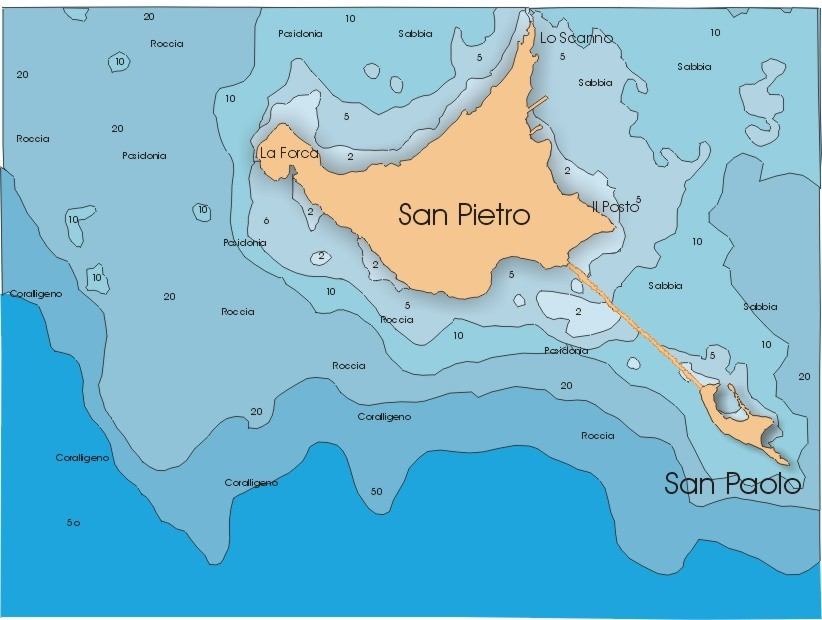
Cheradi Islands

The Cheradi Islands include:

- Campo Islet - 40°03′14″N 17°58′09″E
- Gallipoli - 40°03′20″N 17°59′30″E
- San Paolo - 40°26′19″N 17°10′31″E
- San Pietro - 40°26′58″N 17°09′23″E
- Sant'Andrea - 40°02′56″N 17°56′59″E

=== Grado Lagoon ===
There are nearly 120 islands in the Marano Grado Lagoon of the Adriatic Sea, including:

- Anfora Island (canal) - 45°45′14″N 13°16′19″E
- Barbana - 45°42′12″N 13°25′23″E
- Fossalon Island near Grado - 45°40′40″N 13°23′41″E
- Isola di Grado - 45°40′49″N 13°25′05″E
- Isola Morgo, 45°42′24″N 13°19′01″E
- San Pietro d'Orio - 45°41′28″N 13°21′02″E
- Schiusa Island (canal) - 45°41′00″N 13°24′00″E

=== Gulf of La Spezia ===
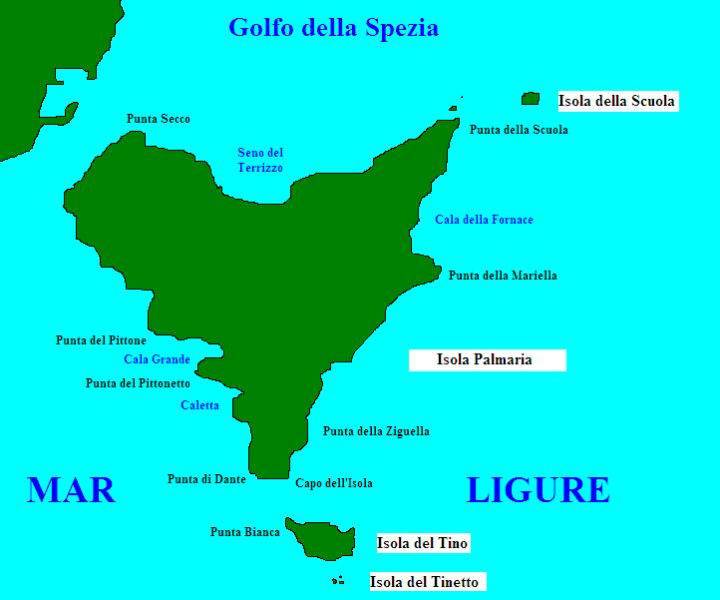
Arcipelago Spezzino (Liguria)

Islands in the Gulf of La Spezia include:

- Ferale Skerry - 44°04′16″N 9°46′52″E
- Palmaria - 44°02′34″N 9°50′38″E
- Scola - 44°03′06″N 9°51′30″E
- Tinetto - 44°01′25″N 9°51′04″E
- Tino - 44°01′37″N 9°51′03″E

=== Ligurian Islands ===
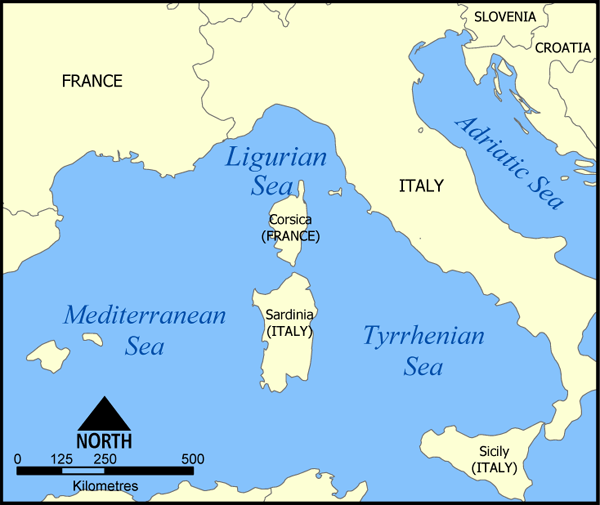
Liguarian Sea

The Italian islands in the Ligurian Sea include:

- Bergeggi (uninhabited 44°14′04″N 8°26′42″E
- Gallinara (private) - 44°01′32″N 8°13′35″E

=== Marano Lagoon ===
Islands in the Marano Lagoon include:

- Isola Marinetta - 45°42′24″N 13°09′44″E
- Martignano Island - 45°42′24″N 13°10′29″E
- Isola Sant'Andrea - 45°42′55″N 13°12′58″E

=== Pedagne peninsula ===
Islands in the Pedagne Peninsula include:

- Isola Traversa - 40°39′28″N 17°59′27″E
- Isola Chiesa - 40°39′22″N 17°59′38″E
- Isla Monacello - 40°39′28″N 17°59′30″E
- Isole Pedagne, 40°39′16″N 18°00′01″E
- Isole Pedagne Grande - 40°39′16″N 18°00′11″E

=== Pontine Islands ===
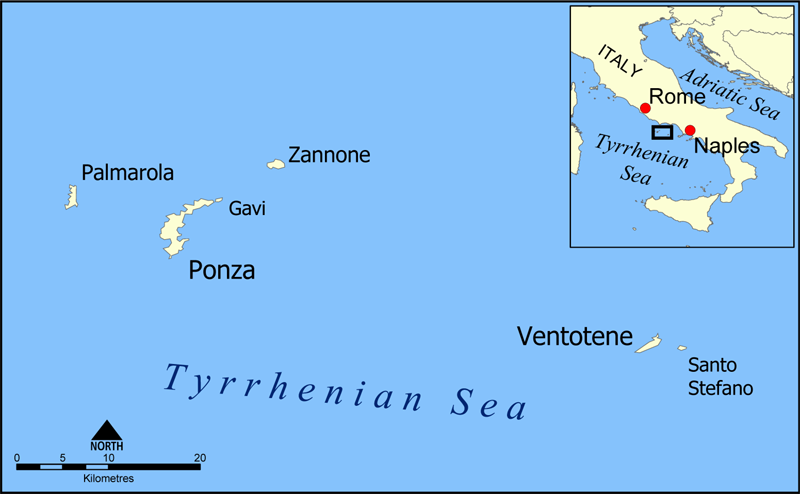
Pontine Islands

Islands in the Pontine Islands archipelago (Tyrrhenian Sea) include:

- Isolo di Gavi (uninhabited) - 40°56′07″N 13°00′03″E
  - Le Scoglitelle Skerries - 40°56′16″N 13°00′35″E
  - Piana di Mezzo Skerry - 40°56′31″N 13°01′00″E
  - Rosso Skerry - 40°56′48″N 13°01′29″E
- Palmarola - 40°56′13″N 12°51′29″E
  - Faraglioni di Mezzogiorno - 40°55′24″N 12°50′53″E
  - Forcina Skerry - 40°56′18″N 12°51′41″E
  - I Piatti Skerries - 40°56′52″N 12°51′00″E
  - Pallante Skerry - 40°55′43″N 12°50′56″E
  - Scuncillo Skerry - 40°57′02″N 12°51′14″E
  - Suvace Skerry - 40°55′38″N 12°51′37″E
- Ponza - 40°54′27″N 12°57′09″E
  - Aniello Antonio Skerry - 40°55′21″N 12°58′38″E
  - Cantina Skerries - 40°55′26″N 12°57′59″E
  - Faraglioni della Madonna - 40°53′40″N 12°58′22″E
  - Faraglioni di Calzo - 40°53′05″N 12°57′55″E
  - Faraglioni di Maria Rosa - 40°54′45″N 12°56′45″E
  - Felce Skerries - 40°56′06″N 12°59′28″E
  - Montagnello Skerry - 40°54′13″N 12°56′36″E
  - Ravia Skerry - 40°54′00″N 12°57′56″E
  - Rosso Skerry - 40°53′51″N 12°58′22″E
- Santo Stefano - 40°47′22″N 13°27′15″E
- Ventotene - 40°47′37″N 13°25′33″E
- Nave Skerry - 40°47′42″N 13°26′05″E
- Zannone (uninhabited) - 40°58′14″N 13°03′18″E

=== Porto Cesareo lagoon ===
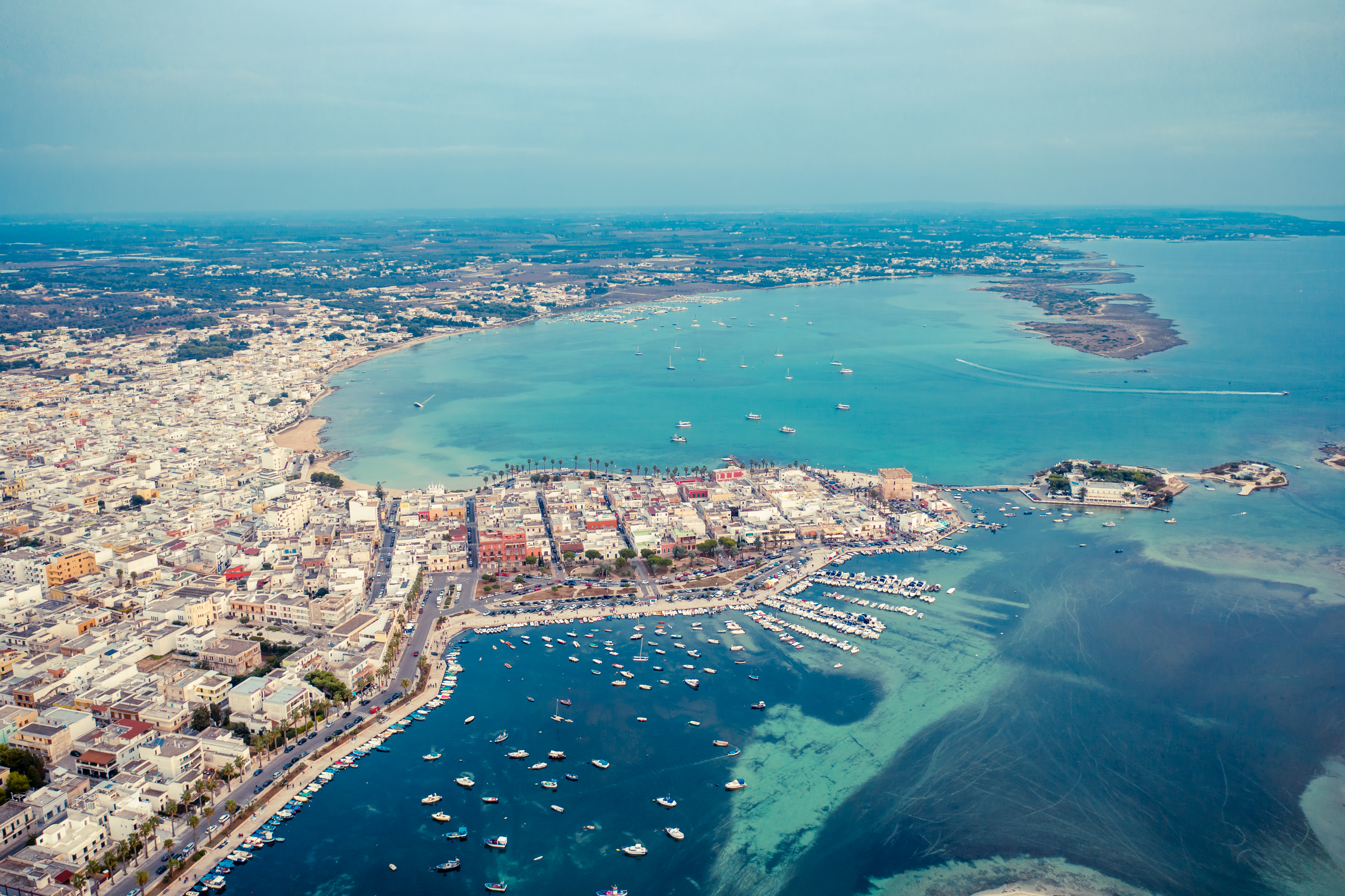
Porto Cesareo

Islands in the Porto Cesareo lagoon (40°15′11″N 17°54′05″E) include:

- Conigli - 40°15′36″N 17°53′01″E
- Lo Scoglio - 40°15′20″N 17°53′28″E
- Malva - 40°16′12″N 17°52′00″E
- Isola della Testa - 40°15′13″N 17°53′25″E
- Russa Skerry - 40°00′29″N 16°36′41″E
- Sant'Isidoro - 40°13′08″N 17°55′16″E

=== Sardinia ===
Island of Sardinia

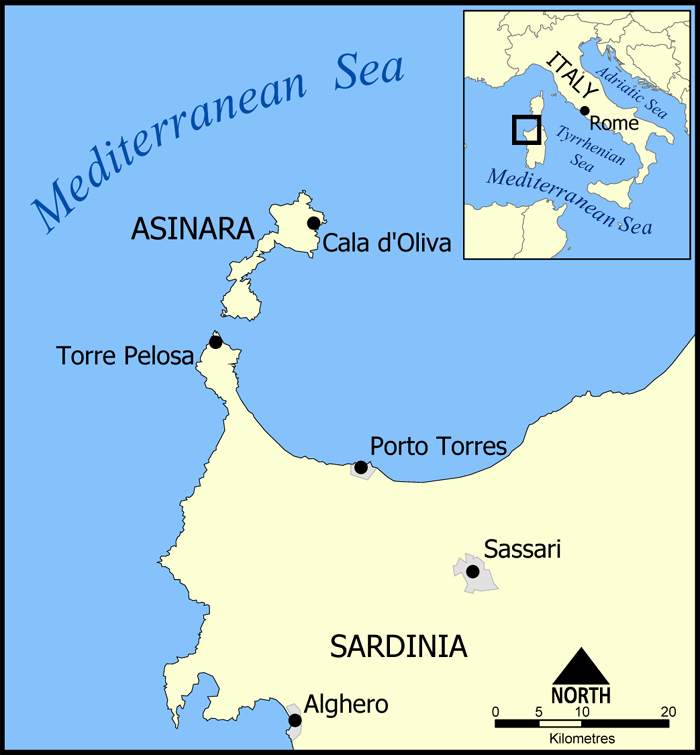
Asinara Island

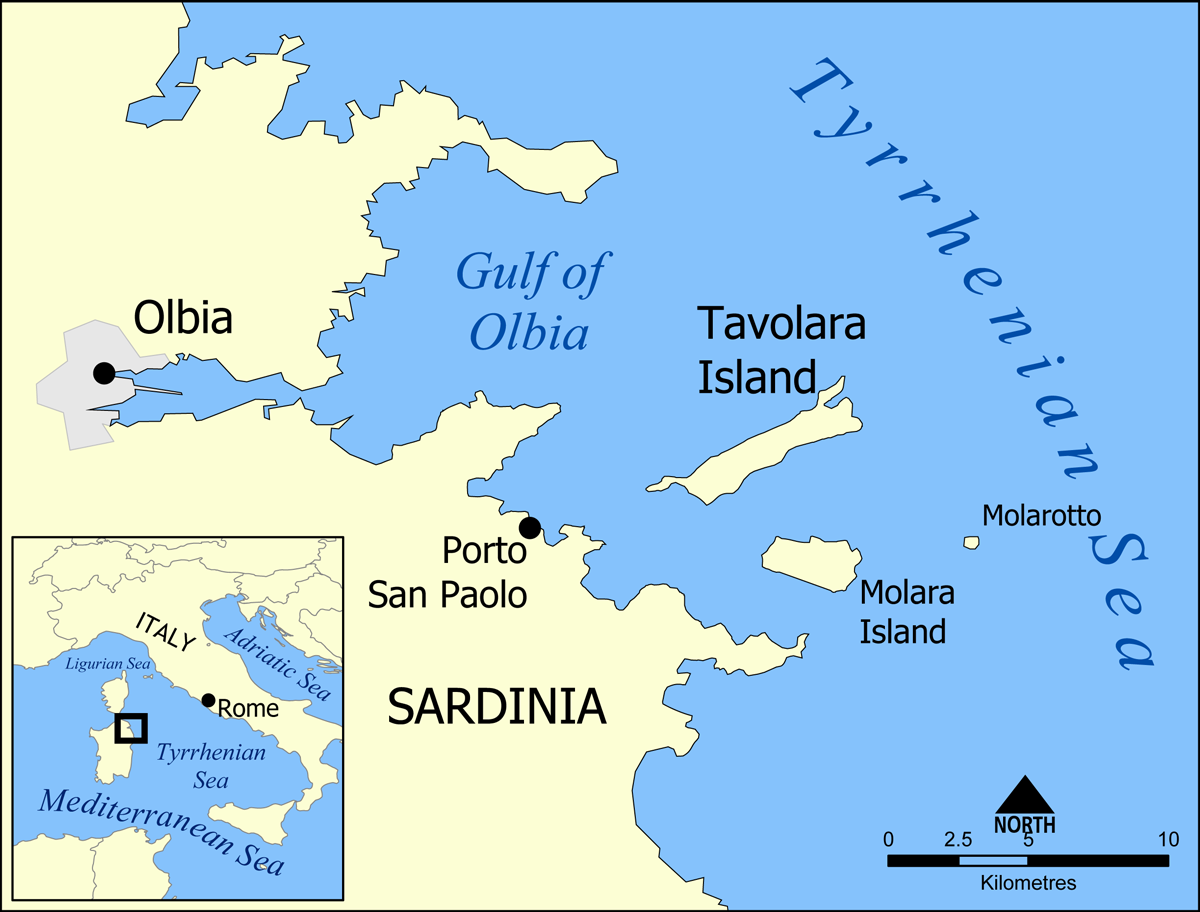
Tavolara Island

Sardinia is the second largest island (24,089 km^{2} (9,301 sq mi)) (40°00′00″N 9°00′00″E) and includes the following outlying islands:

- Agusteri Skerries - 39°18′44″N 8°25′37″E
- Bocca - 40°55′14″N 9°34′01″E
- Asinara (7th largest island at 51 km^{2} (20 sq mi))- 41°02′57″N 8°15′28″E
  - Bocca Islet - 40°59′08″N 8°12′48″E
  - Candelere Islets - 41°03′06″N 8°15′02″E
  - Piana Island - 40°58′30″N 8°13′05″E
    - Isolotto - 40°58′02″N 8°13′29″E
  - Sgombro Islet - 41°01′43″N 8°15′08″E
- Barca Sconcia - 40°55′03″N 9°38′50″E
- Campionna - 38°54′52″N 8°45′56″E
- Cana Islet - 40°51′52″N 9°40′37″E
- Caogheddas - 39°54′15″N 8°23′49″E
- Cappucini Island - 41°09′12″N 9°30′07″E
- Catalano Skerry - 39°52′54″N 8°16′32″E
- Cau Islet - 41°04′29″N 9°35′14″E
- Cavalli Island - 40°53′08″N 9°38′25″E
- Cavoli - 39°05′12″N 9°31′54″E
- Colombaia Skerry - 41°13′58″N 9°16′45″E
- Coltellazzo - 38°59′06″N 9°01′23″E
- Corona Niedda Skerries - 40°12′36″N 8°27′18″E
- Cruccianas - 39°03′56″N 8°29′05″E
- delle Rocche Islet - 41°07′01″N 9°34′08″E
- de sa Scruidda - 39°04′59″N 8°30′35″E
- Faraglioni di Cea - 39°52′20″N 9°41′08″E
- Ferraglione Islets - 38°52′55″N 8°49′38″E
- Figarolo - 40°58′49″N 9°38′36″E
- Foradada Skerry - 40°34′14″N 8°09′05″E
- Geniò Skerry - 39°05′41″N 8°16′58″E
- Is Canneddas Skerry
- La Ghignetta Skerry - 39°11′59″N 8°22′10″E
- Maddalena archipelago
  - Barrettinelli di Dentro - 41°16′32″N 9°24′11″E
  - Barrettinelli di Fuori - 41°18′06″N 9°24′03″E
  - Barrettini - 41°17′02″N 9°24′05″E
  - Bisce Islet - 41°09′52″N 9°31′21″E
  - Budelli (uninhabited)- 41°17′01″N 9°21′03″E
  - Caprera - 41°12′26″N 9°27′40″E
    - Italiani Islands - 41°13′33″N 9°27′20″E
    - Pecora Islet - 41°10′58″N 9°29′08″E
    - Porco Islet - 41°10′28″N 9°27′39″E
  - Corcelli - 41°17′40″N 9°24′00″E
  - La Maddalena - 41°14′09″N 9°24′52″E
    - Abbatoggia - 41°15′12″N 9°23′59″E
    - Chiesa Island - 41°12′50″N 9°25′03″E
    - Giardinelli Island - 41°13′58″N 9°26′26″E
  - Piana (La Maddalena) - 41°17′42″N 9°24′18″E
  - Razzoli - 41°18′04″N 9°20′52″E
  - Santa Maria (Sardinia) Island - 41°17′54″N 9°22′29″E
  - Santo Stefano - 41°11′53″N 9°24′43″E
    - Roma Islet - 41°11′47″N 9°23′48″E
  - Spargi (uninhabited) - 41°14′28″N 9°20′43″E
    - Spargiotto - 41°15′01″N 9°19′25″E
    - Spargiottello Skerry - 41°15′06″N 9°19′15″E
- Mal di Ventre (private) - 39°59′26″N 8°18′17″E
  - Marmorata Islets - 41°15′14″N 9°14′17″E
- Monte Russo Skerries - 41°09′29″N 9°07′11″E
- Morto Skerry - 39°18′18″N 8°18′17″E
- Mortorio - 41°04′37″N 9°36′15″E
  - Mortoriotto Skerries - 41°05′10″N 9°37′06″E
- Municca Islet - 41°15′02″N 9°11′04″E
  - Munichedda Skerry - 41°15′12″N 9°11′08″E
- Nibani Islands - 41°07′35″N 9°33′58″E
- Ogliastra Island - 39°58′27″N 9°42′12″E
- Pan di Zucchero Skerry - 39°20′02″N 8°24′02″E
- Patron Fiaso - 40°54′17″N 9°34′59″E
- Pedrami Islet - 40°41′06″N 9°46′01″E
- Peppino Skerry - 39°14′13″N 9°34′20″E
- Piana (Capo Caccia) - 40°36′13″N 8°08′28″E
- Piscadeddus Skerries - 39°07′27″N 9°27′54″E
- Porcu e Scriba - 39°04′05″N 8°29′43″E
- Porri Islet - 40°52′50″N 8°12′49″E
- Portisco Islet - 41°02′31″N 9°31′44″E
- Portolucas - 40°55′17″N 9°38′01″E
- Poveri Islets] - 41°05′38″N 9°34′51″E
- Quirra Islet - 39°31′29″N 9°39′32″E
- Rossa (Trinità d'Agultu e Vignola) - 41°00′51″N 8°51′48″E
- Rossa (Teulada) - 38°54′53″N 8°42′59″E
- Ruia Islet - 40°49′40″N 9°42′28″E
- Sa Craba Skerry - 40°19′14″N 8°26′30″E
- Sa Mesalonga - 40°02′46″N 8°23′48″E
- Sa Pagliosa Skerry - 40°21′37″N 8°22′39″E
- Sa Tonnara Skerry - 40°03′13″N 8°24′13″E
- San Macario - 39°00′12″N 9°01′56″E
- Sant'Elmo Skerry - 39°06′09″N 9°31′38″E
- Santo Stefano Skerry - 39°06′48″N 9°29′58″E
- Serpentara - 39°08′24″N 9°36′20″E
- Sarrala Skerry - 39°39′59″N 9°39′38″E
- Soffi - 41°03′52″N 9°34′32″E
  - Le Camere Islets - 41°04′12″N 9°35′10″E
- Su Cardolinu - 38°53′53″N 8°53′26″E
- Su Giudeu - 38°52′56″N 8°51′54″E
- Su Scoglio Mannu - 39°13′36″N 8°21′23″E
- Su Scoglitteddu - 39°12′11″N 8°22′29″E
- Sulcis Archipelago
  - Piana (Sulcis) - 39°11′30″N 8°19′15″E
  - San Pietro (5th largest at 51 km^{2} (20 sq mi)) - 39°08′57″N 8°16′09″E
    - Cala Vinagra - 39°09′59″N 8°14′33″E
    - Catena Skerry - 39°11′46″N 8°19′11″E
    - Corno Islet - 39°08′51″N 8°12′28″E
    - Ratti Island - 39°11′09″N 8°19′08″E
    - Spine Skerries- 39°08′10″N 8°14′41″E
    - Stea Skerry - 39°10′32″N 8°15′45″E
  - Sant'Antioco (4th largest island at 109 km^{2} (42 sq mi))- 39°02′41″N 8°25′01″E
    - Manna Islet - 39°04′39″N 8°30′09″E
    - Mangiabarche Skerry - 39°04′35″N 8°20′44″E
    - Toro Islet - 38°51′42″N 8°24′34″E
    - Vacca Islet - 38°56′14″N 8°26′59″E
    - Vitello - 38°56′29″N 8°27′01″E
- Sant'Elia Skerry - 39°11′01″N 9°08′32″E
- Tavolara Islands - 40°54′18″N 9°42′49″E
  - Molara Island - 40°52′09″N 9°43′39″E
  - Molarotto - 40°52′29″N 9°46′41″E
  - Ogliastra Islet - 39°58′27″N 9°42′14″E
  - Proratora - 40°50′48″N 9°43′24″E
  - Quirra Skerry - 39°31′28″N 9°39′31″E
  - Rosso Islet - 40°52′39″N 9°40′17″E
  - Rujia Islet - 40°32′21″N 9°49′07″E
  - Ratti Islet - 39°11′09″N 8°19′08″E
- Tuaredda - 38°53′30″N 8°48′48″E

=== Sicily ===
Islands of Sicily

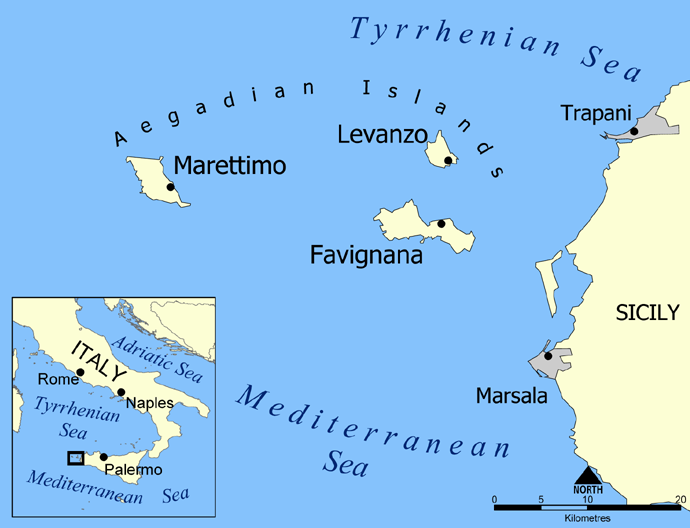
Aegadian Islands

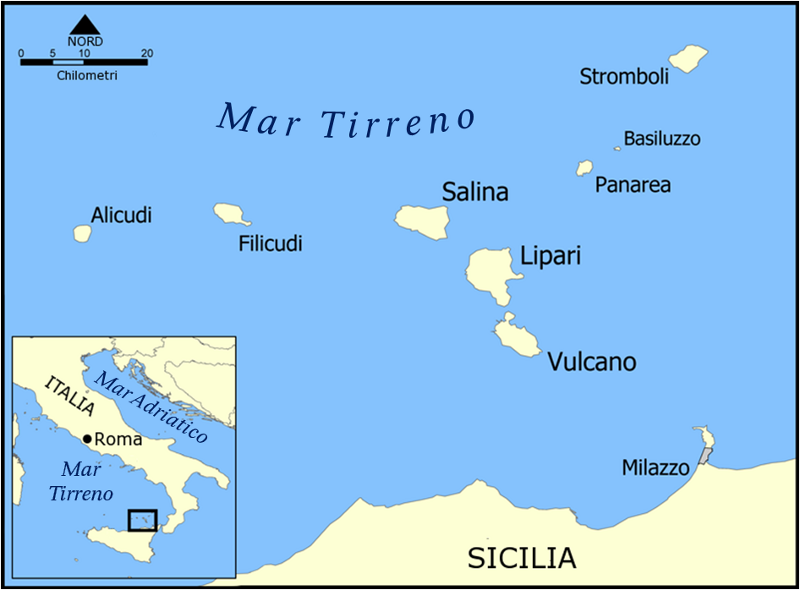
Aeolian Islands

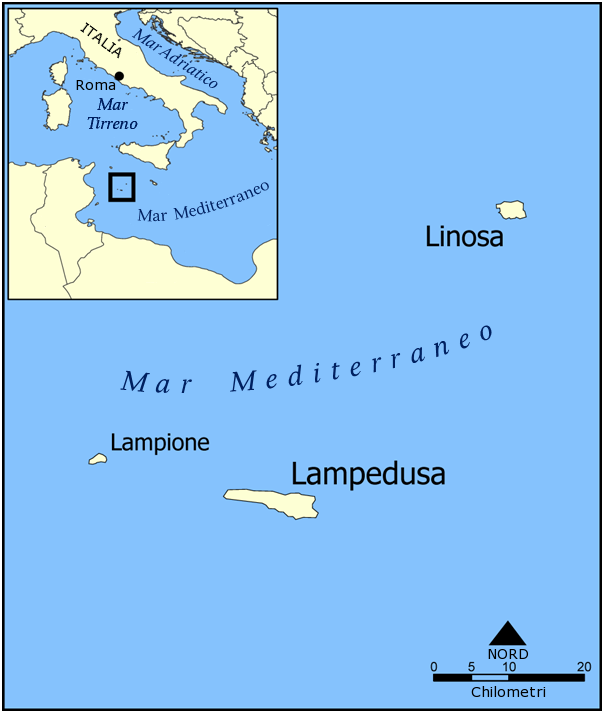
Pelagian Islands

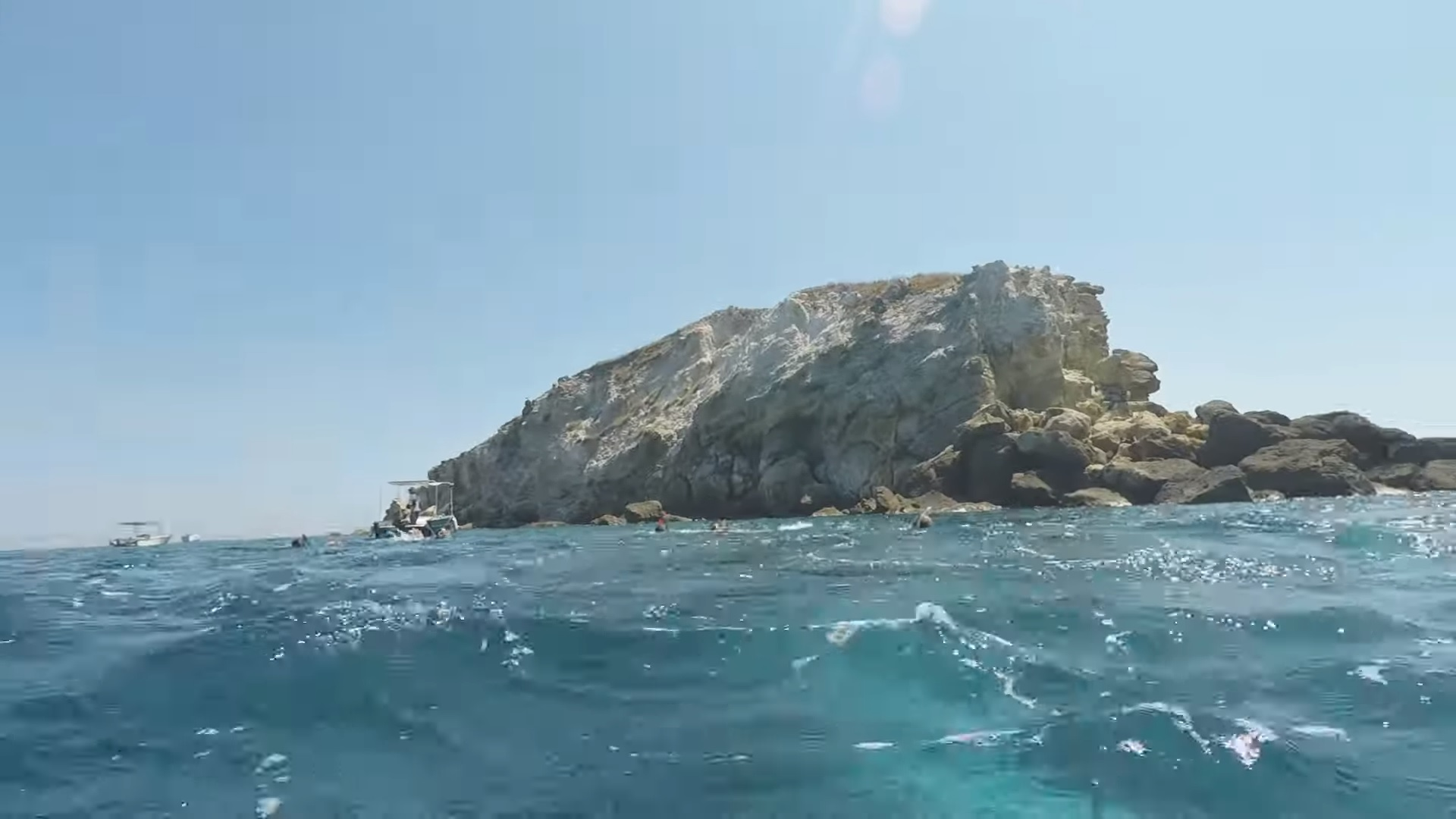
Bottaro Islet

Sicily is the largest island at 25,832.39 km^{2} (9,973.94 sq mi) (37°30′N 14°00′E) and includes the following outlying islands:

- Aegadian Islands include:
  - Favignana - 37°55′34″N 12°19′16″E
    - Galeotta Islet - 37°54′43″N 12°17′55″E
    - Galera Islet - 37°54′52″N 12°17′25″E
    - Palumbo Skerry - 37°54′52″N 12°18′40″E
    - Preveto Islet - 37°54′52″N 12°18′08″E
  - Formica Islet - 37°59′21″N 12°25′32″E
  - Levanzo - 38°00′00″N 12°20′00″E
  - Il Faraglione (it) - 37°59′12″N 12°19′43″E
  - Isola Maraone (it) - 37°59′25″N 12°24′50″E
  - Marettimo - 37°58′10″N 12°03′26″E
    - Camello Skerry - 37°59′00″N 12°03′55″E
- Augusta - 37°13′41″N 15°13′18″E
- Bella - 37°51′01″N 15°18′03″E
- Brolo Skerry - 38°09′54″N 14°49′32″E
- Capo Passero Island - 36°41′13″N 15°08′56″E
- Correnti Islet - 36°38′44″N 15°04′39″E
- Aeolian Islands include:
  - Alicudi - 38°32′38″N 14°21′07″E
    - Palomba Skerry - 38°31′57″N 14°21′37″E
  - Basiluzzo - 38°39′48″N 15°06′50″E
    - Bottaro Rock - 38°38′15″N 15°06′39″E
    - Nave Skerry - 38°38′49″N 15°03′51″E
    - Spinazzola Skerry - 38°39′52″N 15°06′29″E
  - Filicudi - 38°34′17″N 14°33′45″E
    - Cuddurra Skerry - 38°34′11″N 14°32′37″E
    - Fortuna Skerry - 38°34′26″N 14°32′24″E
    - Giafante Skerry - 38°35′13″N 14°32′46″E
    - La Canna Skerry - 38°34′57″N 14°31′16″E
    - Mitra Skerry - 38°34′43″N 14°32′20″E
    - Montenassari Skerry - 38°34′56″N 14°31′37″E
  - Lipari (9th largest 37 km^{2} (14 sq mi)) - 38°29′23″N 14°56′07″E
    - Faraglioni of Lipari - 38°26′23″N 14°56′35″E
    - Pietra del Bagno Skerry - 38°28′30″N 14°53′45″E
  - Panarea - 38°38′15″N 15°04′00″E
    - Dattilo Islet - 38°38′22″N 15°05′50″E
    - Le Formiche Skerries - 38°37′38″N 15°05′02″E
    - Le Guglie Skerries - 38°38′21″N 15°05′46″E
    - Lisca Bianca Islet - 38°38′21″N 15°06′50″E
    - Lisca Nera Skerries - 38°38′05″N 15°06′24″E
    - Panarelli Skerry - 38°38′32″N 15°05′59″E
  - Salina (10th largest at 26 km^{2} (10 sq mi)) - 38°33′55″N 14°50′00″E
    - Faraglione Skerry - 38°34′46″N 14°48′03″E
  - Stromboli - 38°47′38″N 15°12′40″E
    - Strombolicchio - 38°49′02″N 15°15′07″E
  - Vulcano - 38°23′58″N 14°57′50″E
    - Quaglietto Stone - 38°24′00″N 14°56′19″E
    - Sirene Skerry - 38°25′13″N 14°57′04″E
- Asinelli Islet - 38°03′51″N 12°31′46″E
- Carabiniere Skerry - 37°04′42″N 15°17′51″E
- Castelluccio Skerries - 37°02′38″N 15°18′09″E
- Colombaia Islet - 38°00′41″N 12°29′36″E
- Cyclopean Isles islands include:
  - Lachea - 37°33′41″N 15°10′00″E
  - Faraglione Grande - 37°33′35″N 15°09′56″E
  - Faraglione di Mezzo
  - Faraglione degli Uccelli
- Faraglioni di Ciriga - 36°41′42″N 14°58′49″E
- Femmine Islet - 38°12′37″N 13°14′09″E
- Ferdinandea (submerged volcano) - 37°10′00″N 12°43′00″E
- Gucciarda Skerries - 37°17′28″N 13°27′08″E
- Iannuzzo Skerry - 36°41′07″N 14°58′31″E
- La Galera Skerry - 37°02′30″N 15°17′43″E
- Malconsiglio Skerry - 38°01′30″N 12°29′48″E
- Milocca Skerry - 37°00′16″N 15°16′53″E
- Ortygia - 37°03′42″N 15°17′41″E
- Ognina Islet - 36°58′45″N 15°15′49″E
- Palumbo Skerry (Trapani) - 38°00′45″N 12°29′19″E
- Pantelleria (5th largest island at 83 km^{2} (32 sq mi)) - 36°47′20″N 11°59′38″E
  - Faraglione di Dietro Isola - 36°45′25″N 12°03′11″E
  - Faraglione di Tracino - 36°47′56″N 12°03′07″E
  - Galera della Salina Skerry - 36°45′20″N 12°03′07″E
  - Scoglietti Skerry - 36°44′07″N 12°01′34″E
- Patti Skerry - 38°09′39″N 14°59′32″E
- Patti Stone - 38°09′40″N 14°59′23″E
- Pelagian Islands include:
  - Lampedusa - 35°30′56″N 12°34′23″E
    - Conigli Islet - 35°30′37″N 12°33′30″E
    - Faraglione - 35°31′44″N 12°32′39″E
    - Pignolta Skerry - 35°31′37″N 12°31′25″E
    - Sacramento Skerry - 35°31′44″N 12°31′42″E
  - Lampione (uninhabited) - 35°33′06″N 12°19′18″E
  - Linosa - 35°52′00″N 12°52′00″E
    - Faraglioni di Linosa - 35°52′03″N 12°52′56″E
    - Bovi Marini Skerries - 35°52′18″N 12°52′50″E
- Palumbo Skerry (Trapani) - 38°00′45″N 12°29′19″E
- Piccola Islet - 36°44′18″N 15°07′08″E
- Pietra Patella Skerry - 37°11′23″N 13°39′25″E
- Pizzo Skerries - 37°04′19″N 15°17′53″E
- Porcelli Skerries - 38°02′38″N 12°26′22″E
- Porri (Sicily) - 36°41′11″N 14°55′55″E
- Rocca San Nicola Islet - 37°06′44″N 13°51′23″E
- San Biagio Skerry - 38°02′31″N 14°30′40″E
- Scialandro Skerry - 38°06′55″N 12°41′07″E
- Scibiliana Skerry - 37°43′50″N 12°28′10″E
- Stagnone Lagoon (Isolo dello Stagnone it) include:
  - Isola Grande (it) - 37°52′54″N 12°26′33″E
  - Isola La Scuola (it) - 37°51′46″N 12°27′24″E
  - San Pantaleo - 37°52′06″N 12°28′07″E
  - Isola Santa Maria (it) - 37°52′56″N 12°27′28″E
- Torre Avalos Islet - 37°12′42″N 15°13′27″E
- Scoglio Due Fratelli - 37°05′08″N 15°18′06″E
- Ustica - 38°42′19″N 13°10′34″E
  - Colombara Skerry - 38°43′11″N 13°10′58″E
  - Medico Skerry - 38°42′57″N 13°09′21″E
  - Pastizza Skerry - 38°42′08″N 13°11′35″E
- Vendicari Islet - 36°47′31″N 15°06′19″E
- Vittoria Garcia Islet - 37°14′09″N 15°12′15″E
- Zio Gennaro Skerry - 37°51′34″N 15°18′08″E

=== Tremiti Islands ===
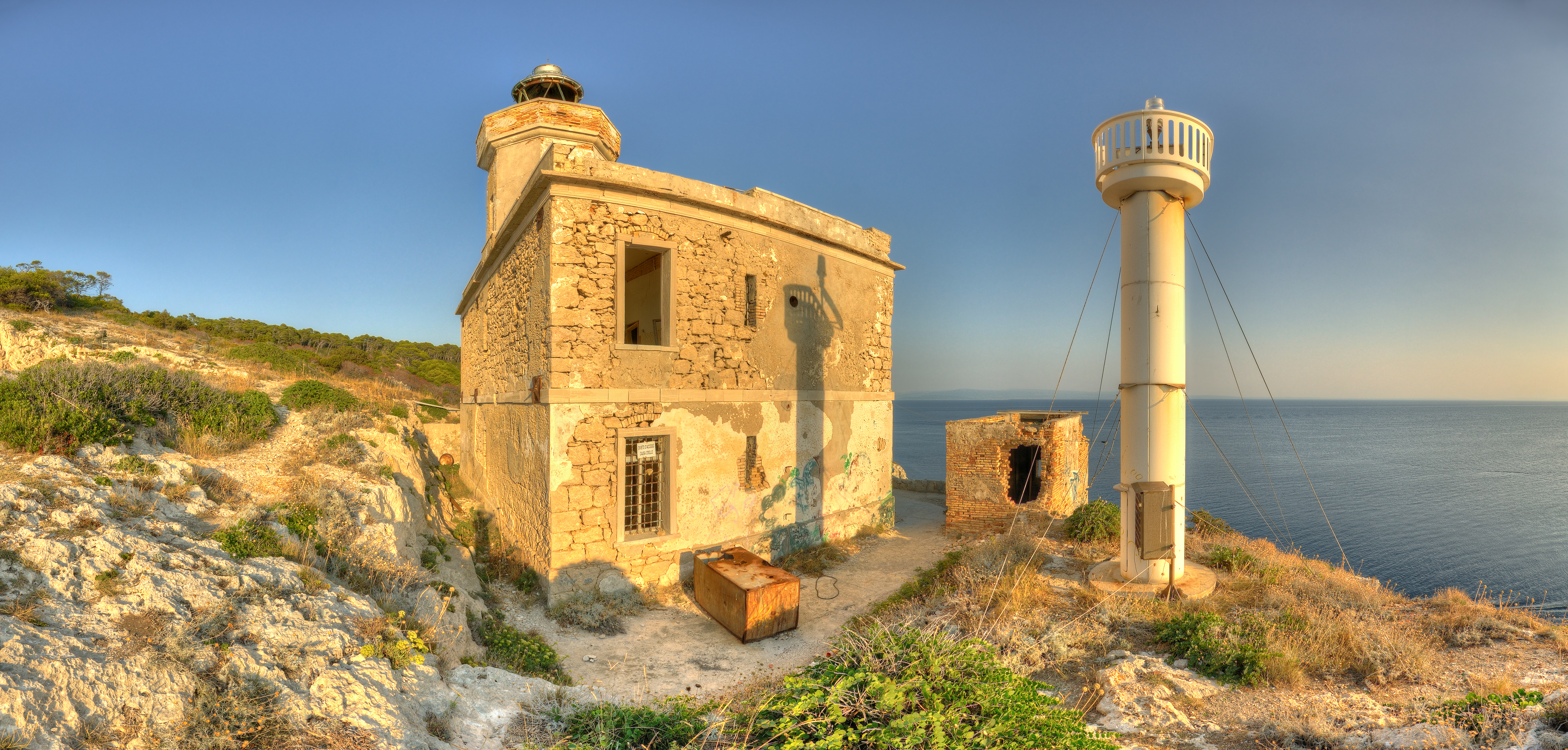
Isola San Domino lighthouse

Islands in the Tremiti Islands are in the Adriatic Sea and include:

- Capraia - 42°08′13″N 15°30′47″E
- Isola San Domino - 42°06′53″N 15°29′15″E
- Isola San Nicola - 42°07′27″N 15°30′38″E
- Cretaccio - 42°07′21″N 15°29′59″E
- Isola Pianosa - 42°13′29″N 15°44′52″E

=== Tuscan Archipelago ===
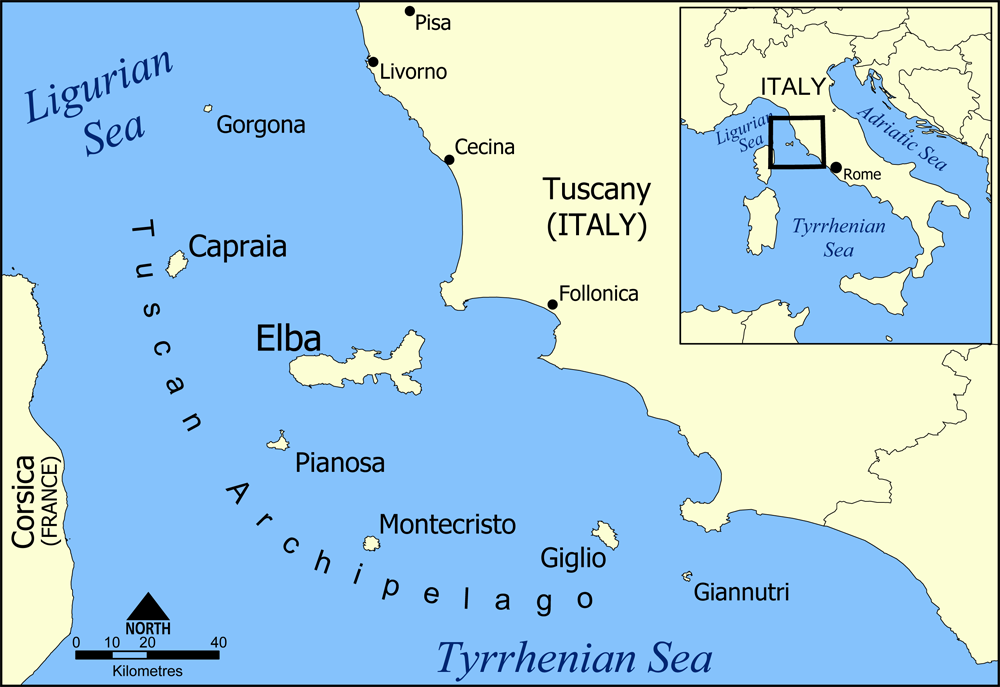
Tuscan Archipelago

Islands in the Tuscan Archipelago include:

- Argentarola Islet - 42°25′07″N 11°04′53″E
- Cappa Skerry - 42°20′59″N 10°52′57″E
- Capra Skerry - 43°04′02″N 9°49′02″E
- Capraia - 43°02′31″N 9°49′19″E
- Cerboli - 42°51′30″N 10°32′53″E
- Corbella Skerries - 42°44′04″N 10°19′11″E
- Elba (3rd largest at 223 km^{2} (86 sq mi) - 42°46′58″N 10°17′11″E
- Faraglione del Giglio - 42°22′11″N 10°52′02″E
- Formica di Burano - 42°22′50″N 11°18′40″E
- Formiche di Capraia - 43°04′30″N 9°49′47″E
- Formiche di Grosseto - 42°34′35″N 10°52′55″E
- Formiche della Zanca - 42°48′23″N 10°07′35″E
- Gatto Skerry - 43°00′22″N 9°48′59″E
- Gemini Skerries - 42°43′05″N 10°22′25″E
- Giannutri - 42°15′00″N 11°06′00″E
- Giglio - 42°21′00″N 10°54′00″E
- Gorgona - 43°25′45″N 9°53′55″E
- I Fratelli Skerry - 42°49′05″N 10°19′58″E
- Rossa Islet - 42°22′40″N 11°07′49″E
- Isolotto - 42°22′53″N 11°12′38″E
- Sparviero Islet - 42°47′51″N 10°42′44″E
- La Nave Skerry - 42°49′49″N 10°15′43″E
- Le Scole Skerries - 42°21′21″N 10°55′44″E
- Meloria - 43°32′53″N 10°13′09″E
- Montecristo - 42°20′00″N 10°19′00″E
- Mosè Skerry - 43°03′05″N 9°48′04″E
- Ogliera Skerry - 42°44′38″N 10°07′08″E
- Ortano Islet - 42°47′25″N 10°26′01″E
- Palmaiola - 42°51′58″N 10°28′30″E
- Paolina Islet - 42°47′22″N 10°13′53″E
- Peraiola Islet - 43°01′55″N 9°47′49″E
- Pianosa - 42°35′00″N 10°05′00″E
- Scarpa Skerry - 42°37′19″N 10°04′48″E
- Schiappino Skerry - 42°49′28″N 10°15′44″E
- Scoglietto di Portoferraio - 42°49′43″N 10°19′52″E
- Scoglio d'Africa - 42°18′06″N 10°04′00″E
- Scoglione - 43°00′53″N 9°49′26″E
- Scola Skerry - 42°35′02″N 10°06′23″E
- Topi Islet - 42°52′15″N 10°25′24″E
- Vada Shoal - 43°19′13″N 10°21′49″E

=== Venetian Lagoon ===
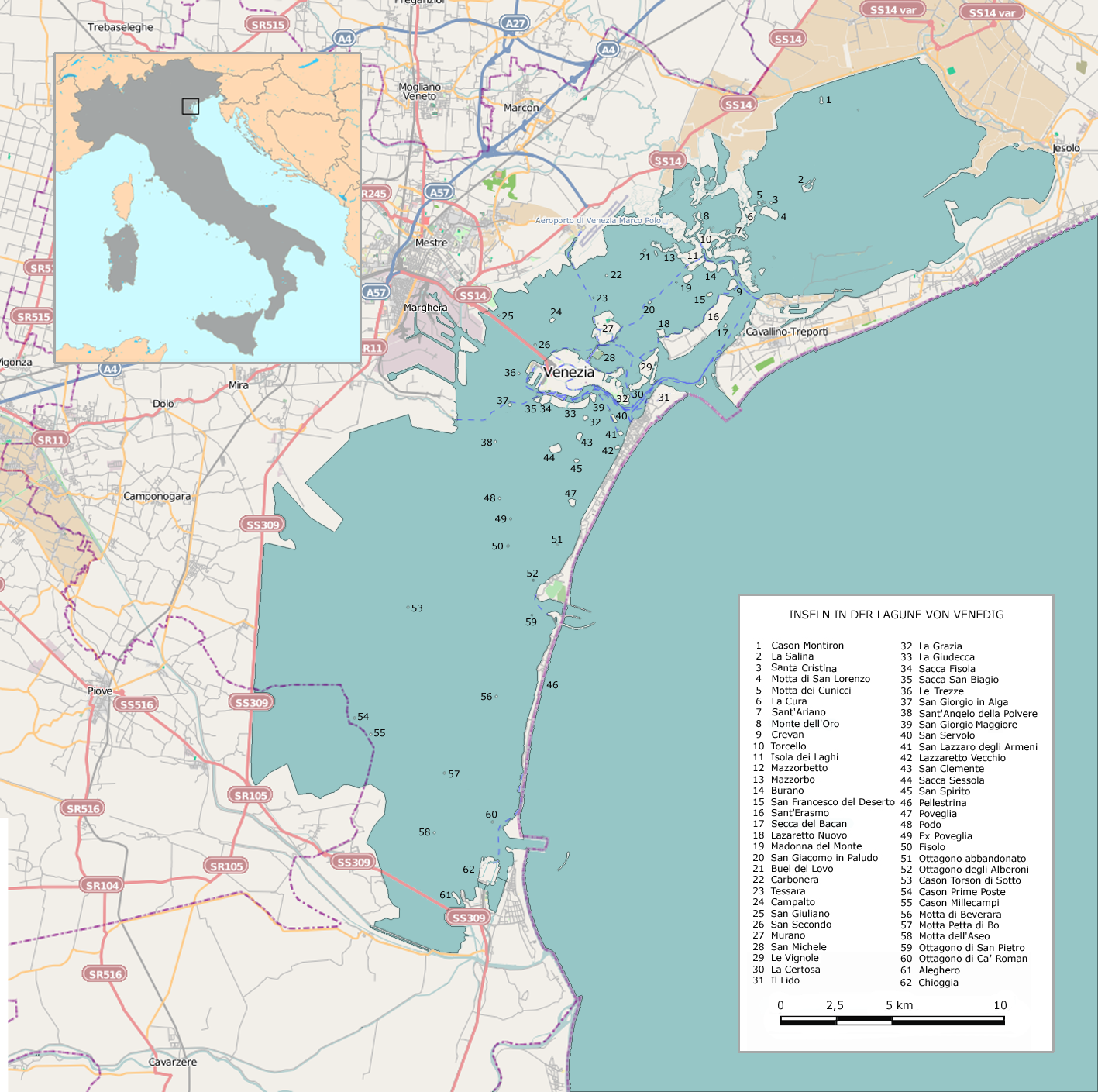
Venetian Lagoon islands

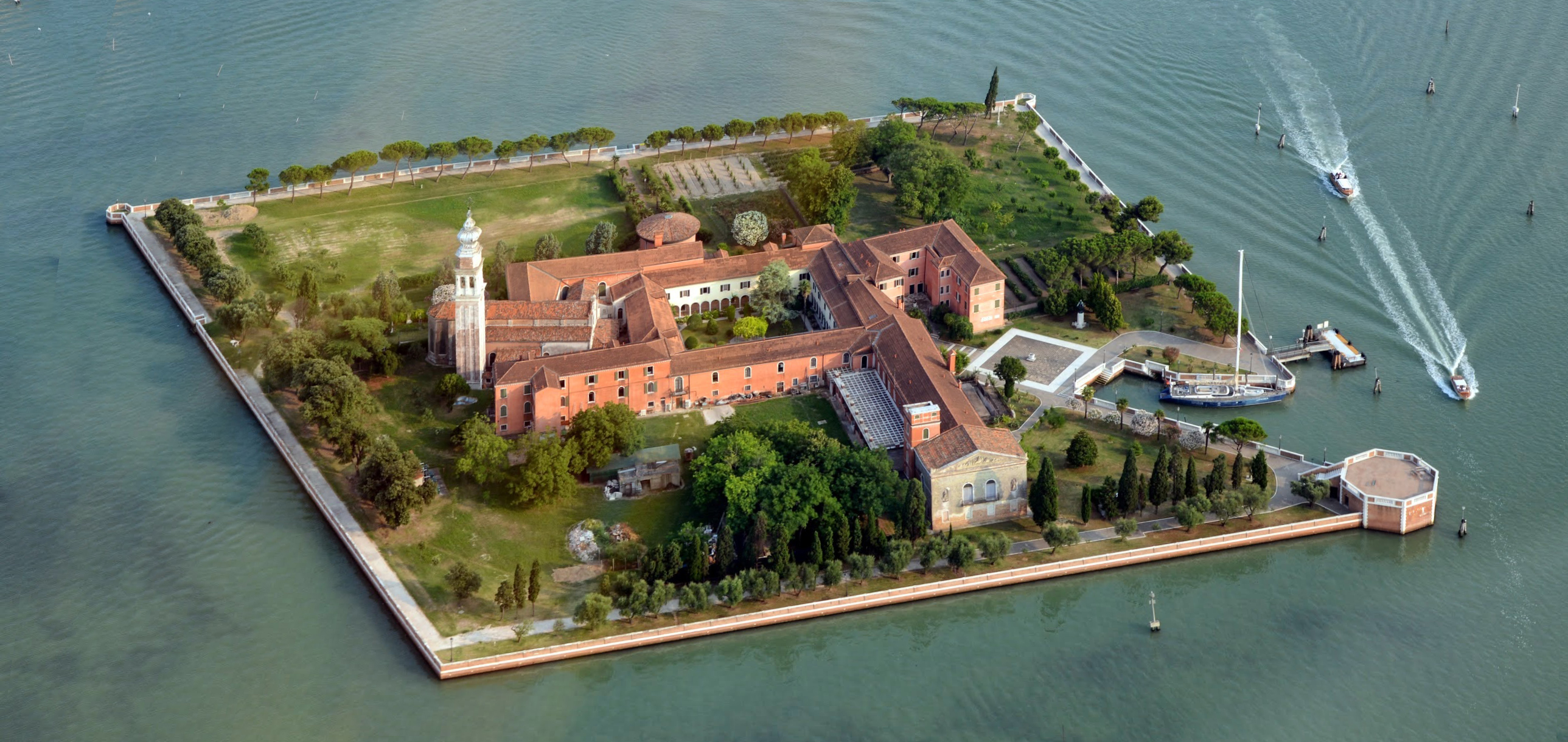
San Lazzaro degli Armeni

Islands in the Venetian Lagoon of the Adriatic Sea include:

- Albarella- 45°04′39″N 12°20′25″E
- Aleghero - 45°12′32″N 12°15′31″E
- Baccan di Sant'Erasmo - 45°26′03″N 12°24′43″E
- Buel del Lovo - 45°29′33″N 12°22′35″E
- Burano - 45°29′09″N 12°25′03″E
- Campalto - 45°27′42″N 12°19′07″E
- Campana Isola - 45°23′02″N 12°17′09″E
- Carbonera Isola - 45°28′52″N 12°21′09″E
- Cason Montiron - 45°33′14″N 12°30′35″E
- Chioggia - 45°13′11″N 12°16′44″E
- Crevan - 45°28′40″N 12°26′02″E
- Ex Poveglia - 45°22′30″N 12°17′34″E
- Fisolo - 45°21′47″N 12°17′27″E
- Giudecca - 45°25′31″N 12°19′35″E
- Isola dei Laghi - 45°29′43″N 12°24′31″E
- Isola dell'Unione - 45°26′15″N 12°20′09″E
- La Certosa - 45°26′02″N 12°22′26″E
- La Cura Island - 45°30′25″N 12°26′32″E
- La Salina Island - 45°30′11″N 12°28′23″E
- Lazzaretto Nuovo - 45°27′22″N 12°23′10″E
- Lazzaretto Vecchio - 45°24′22″N 12°21′34″E
- Lido - 45°24′02″N 12°21′38″E
- Madonna del Monte - 45°28′42″N 12°23′46″E
- Mazzorbetto - 45°29′23″N 12°24′27″E
- Mazzorbo - 45°29′13″N 12°24′33″E
- Monte dell'Oro - 45°31′01″N 12°25′00″E
- Motta dei Cunicci - 45°30′47″N 12°27′19″E
- Motta di San Lorenzo - 45°30′12″N 12°27′42″E
- Murano - 45°27′23″N 12°21′11″E
- Ottagono Abbandonato - 45°21′49″N 12°19′18″E
- Ottagono Alberoni - 45°20′53″N 12°18′25″E
- Ottagono Ca' Roman - 45°14′36″N 12°17′02″E
- Ottagono Poveglia - 45°22′50″N 12°19′54″E
- Ottagono San Pietro - 45°19′58″N 12°18′23″E
- Pellestrina - 45°17′47″N 12°18′30″E
- Poveglia - 45°22′55″N 12°19′52″E
- Sacca Fisola - 45°25′39″N 12°18′54″E
- Sacca San Biagio - 45°25′37″N 12°18′35″E
- Sacca Sessola - 45°24′20″N 12°19′15″E
- San Clemente - 45°24′40″N 12°20′11″E
- San Francesco del Deserto - 45°28′24″N 12°25′01″E
- San Giacomo in Paludo - 45°28′10″N 12°22′46″E
- San Giorgio in Alga - 45°25′30″N 12°17′32″E
- San Giorgio Maggiore - 45°25′41″N 12°20′39″E
- San Giuliano - 45°27′50″N 12°17′11″E
- San Lazzaro degli Armeni - 45°24′44″N 12°21′41″E
- San Marco in Boccalama (former island) - 45°23′19″N 12°16′53″E
- San Michele - 45°26′48″N 12°20′50″E
- San Pietro di Castello - 45°26′02″N 12°21′36″E
- San Secondo - 45°27′05″N 12°18′27″E
- San Servolo - 45°25′07″N 12°21′26″E
- Sant'Andrea - 45°26′04″N 12°22′52″E
- Sant'Angelo della Polvere (uninhabited) - 45°24′31″N 12°17′00″E
- Sant'Elena - 45°25′38″N 12°21′54″E
- Sant'Erasmo - 45°27′27″N 12°24′45″E
- Santa Cristina Island - 45°30′33″N 12°27′16″E
- Santa Maria della Grazia - 45°25′09″N 12°20′22″E
- Santo Spirito - 45°24′01″N 12°20′03″E
- Sottomarina - 45°11′56″N 12°17′35″E
- Spignon - 45°20′34″N 12°17′44″E
- Tessera Island - 45°28′17″N 12°20′38″E
- Torcello - 45°29′48″N 12°25′02″E
- Trezze - 45°26′17″N 12°17′52″E
- Tronchetto - 45°26′29″N 12°18′20″E
- Venice - 45°26′15″N 12°20′09″E
- Vignole - 45°26′33″N 12°22′45″E

== Islands in lakes and rivers ==
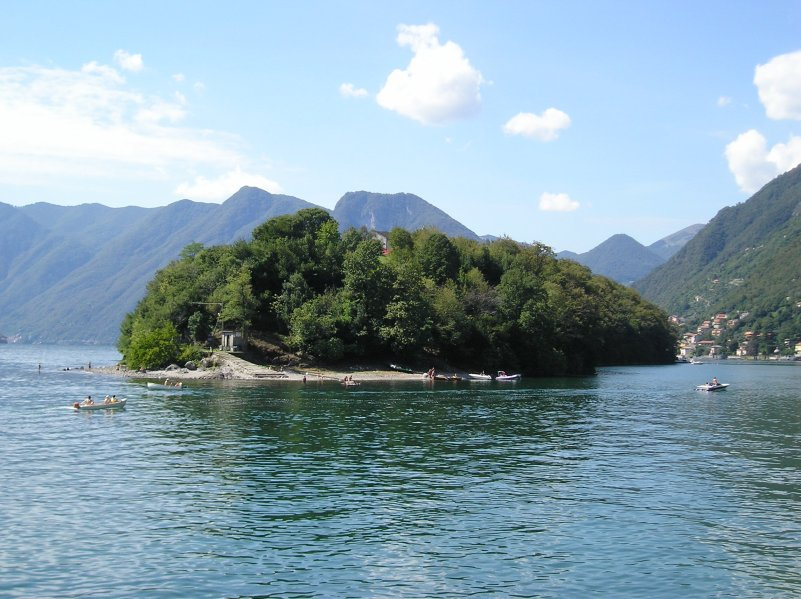
Isola Comacina

Islands in inland lakes and rivers include:

- Lago di Bolsena
  - Isola Bisentina, 42°34′56″N 11°54′26″E
  - Isola Martana, 42°32′57″N 11°57′08″E
- Lago di Como
  - Isola Comacina, 45°57′54″N 9°10′31″E
- Lago di Garda
  - Isola del Garda (private), 45°35′00″N 10°35′00″E
  - Isola dell'Olivo, 45°45′15″N 10°47′42″E
  - Isola di San Biagio, 45°48′42.55″N 8°43′04.69″E
  - Isola del Sogno, 45°44′51″N 10°47′39″E
  - Isola del Trimelone
- Lago d'Iseo
  - Isola di Loreto
  - Montisola (Monte Isola), 45°42′00″N 10°05′00″E
  - Isola di San Paolo, 40°26′20″N 17°10′30″E
- Lago Maggiore
  - Isole Borromee
    - Isola Bella, 45°53′44″N 8°31′36″E
    - Isola Madre, 45°54′42″N 8°32′17″E
    - Scoglio della Malghera, 45°53′34″N 8°31′26″E
    - Isola dei Pescatori (or Isola Superiore), 45°54′02″N 8°31′14″E
    - Isolino di San Giovanni, 45°55′00″N 8°33′19″E
  - Castelli di Cannero, 46°01′26″N 8°42′19″E
  - Isolino Partegora, 45°46′8″N 8°34′40″E
- Lago d'Orta
  - Isola San Giulio, 45°47′46″N 8°23′59″E
- Lago Trasimeno
  - Isola Polvese, 43°07′02″N 12°08′18″E
  - Isola Maggiore, 43°10′34″N 12°05′30″E
  - Isola Minore, 43°11′00″N 12°07′00″E
- Tiber River
  - Isola Tiberina, 41°53′27″N 12°28′38″E
  - Isola Sacra, 41°45′N 12°15′E
- Po River delta
  - Isola Albarella, 45°04′10″N 12°20′40″E
  - Isola d'Ariano, 44°58′30″N 12°10′55″E
  - Isola Donzella

== See also ==
- Insular Italy
- List of islands in the Mediterranean
- List of islands in the Adriatic
- List of islands
- List of bridges in Italy
