= Sacca =

Sacca may refer to:

- Sacca (Buddhism), a Pāli word meaning "real" or "true"

== Places ==
- Sacca, the word for an artificial island in the Venetian Lagoon, see Sacca Fisola, Sacca San Biagio and Sacca Sessola

== People ==
Given name

- Jerome Sacca Kina Guezere (1952–2005), Beninese politician
- Sacca Lafia (born 1944), Beninese politician

Surname

- Ammonius Saccas, the master of Plotinus and Origen
- Brian Sacca (born 1978), American actor, writer and producer
- John Sacca (born 1971), American football player
- Chris Sacca, American venture investor and public speaker
- Crystal English Sacca, American venture investor and author
- Jimmy Sacca (1929-2015), member of singing group The Hilltoppers
- Tony Sacca (born 1970), American football player
- Roberto Saccà (born 1961), German operatic tenor

== Other uses ==
- Sacca-kiriyā, a solemn declaration of truth, expressed in ritual speech
- Samudaya sacca, the Four Noble Truths of Buddhism
