= Punta Filetto Lighthouse =

Lighthouse in Sardinia, Italy

Punta Filetto
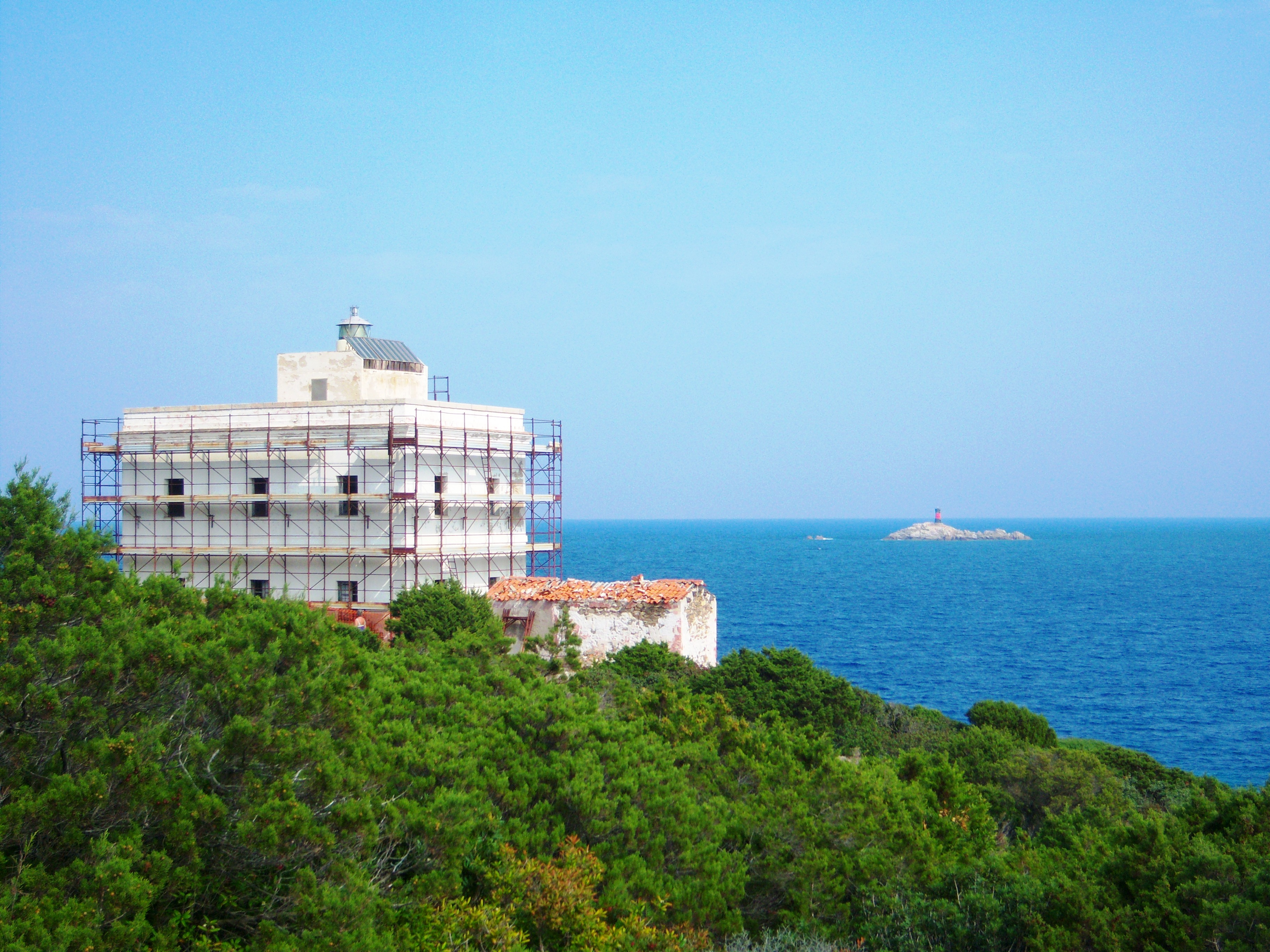
- Punta Filetto Lighthouse in 2009
- Location: Isola Santa Maria; Maddalena archipelago Sardinia; Italy
- Coordinates: 41°17′55″N 9°23′02″E

Tower
- Constructed: 1913
- Foundation: masonry base
- Construction: masonry tower
- Automated: 1972
- Height: 12 metres (39 ft)
- Shape: quadrangular tower with balcony and lantern
- Markings: white tower and lantern, grey metallic lantern dome
- Power source: solar power
- Operator: Marina Militare
- Fog signal: no

Light
- Focal height: 17 metres (56 ft)
- Lens: Type TD 345; Focal length: 187.5
- Intensity: MaxiHalo-60 EFF
- Range: 10 nautical miles (19 km; 12 mi)
- Characteristic: Fl (4) W 20s.
- Italy no.: 1004 E.F.

Punta Filetto Lighthouse (Italian: Faro di Punta Filetto) is an active lighthouse located on the Isola Santa Maria, which makes part of the Maddalena archipelago, on the northern point of the island facing Barrettinelli di Fuori Lighthouse from which it is 1.4 kilometres (0.87 mi) away. The island is in the municipality of La Maddalena on the Tyrrhenian Sea.

== Description ==
The lighthouse was built in 1913 and consists of a masonry quadrangular tower, 12 metres (39 ft) high, with balcony and lantern atop a 2-storey keeper's house. The keeper's house and the tower are painted in white, the lantern dome in grey metallic. The light is positioned at 17 metres (56 ft) above sea level and emits four white flashes in a 20 seconds period visible up to a distance of 10 nautical miles (19 km; 12 mi). The lighthouse is completely automated, powered by a solar unit and managed by the Marina Militare with the identification code number 1004 E.F.

In the 1956–57 school year, after many request from the inhabitants of the islands of Razzoli, Santa Maria and Spargi, a popular school was established for the children of the lighthouse keepers and the shepherds who lived there. The school was hosted inside the lighthouse and the lessons, held by the teacher Masia, started only on January 9, 1957, due to a lack of means.

In 1972 the lighthouse was abandoned by the keepers because it was automated, the building began to fall in ruin and the Arcipelago di La Maddalena National Park restored it in 2006; however the structure was covered with a scaffolding as shown in the image taken in 2009 and so it is still left.

== See also ==
- List of lighthouses in Italy
