= Sant'Andrea Island =

Island in the Ionian Sea

Coordinates: 40°02′57″N 17°57′02″E

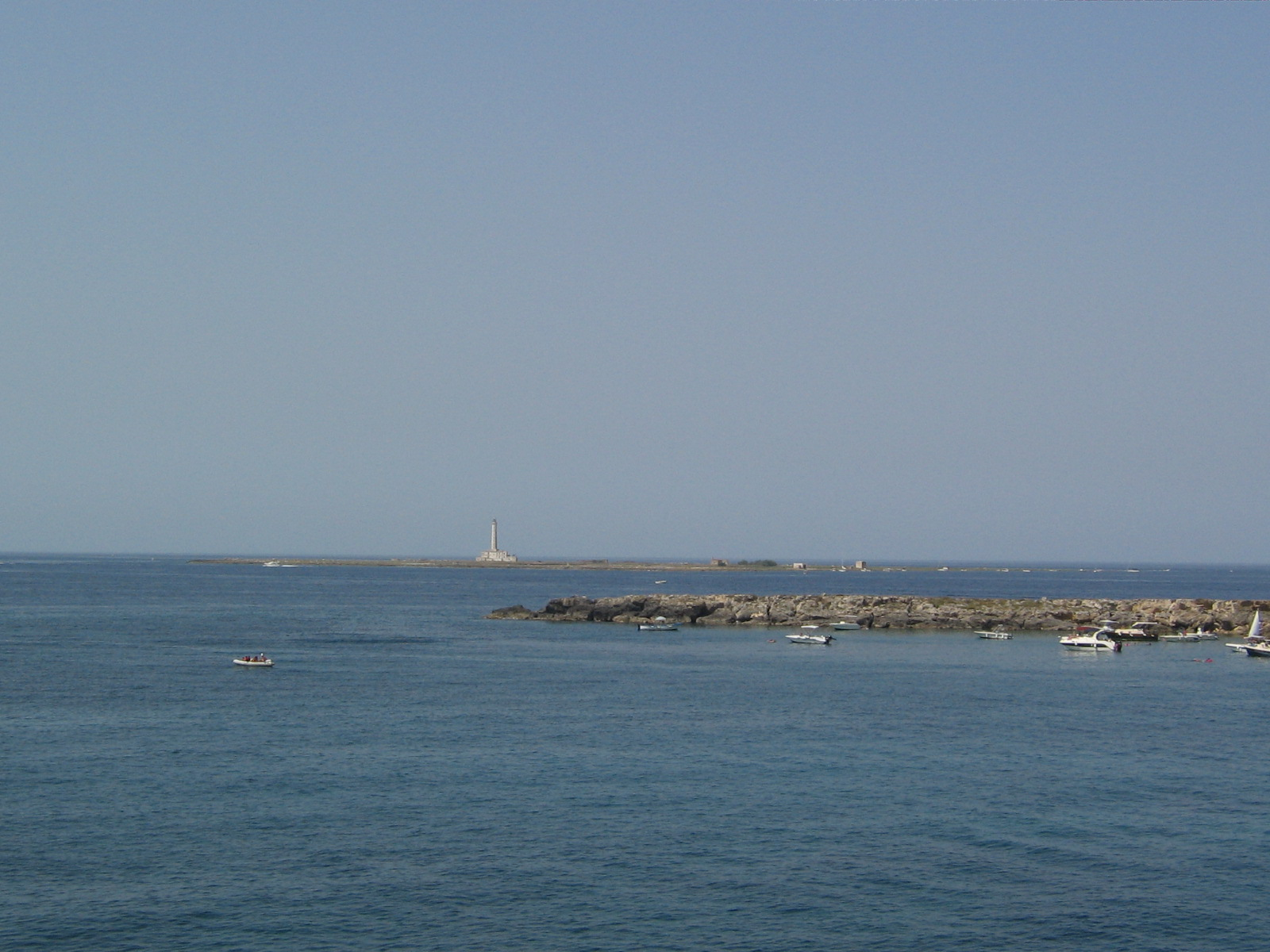
View towards the Island of Sant'Andrea.

Sant'Andrea Island (Italian: Isola di Sant'Andrea) is a small island near Gallipoli in the Ionian Sea.

== See also ==
- List of islands of Italy
- Isola Sant'Andrea Lighthouse
