= Formiche di Grosseto =

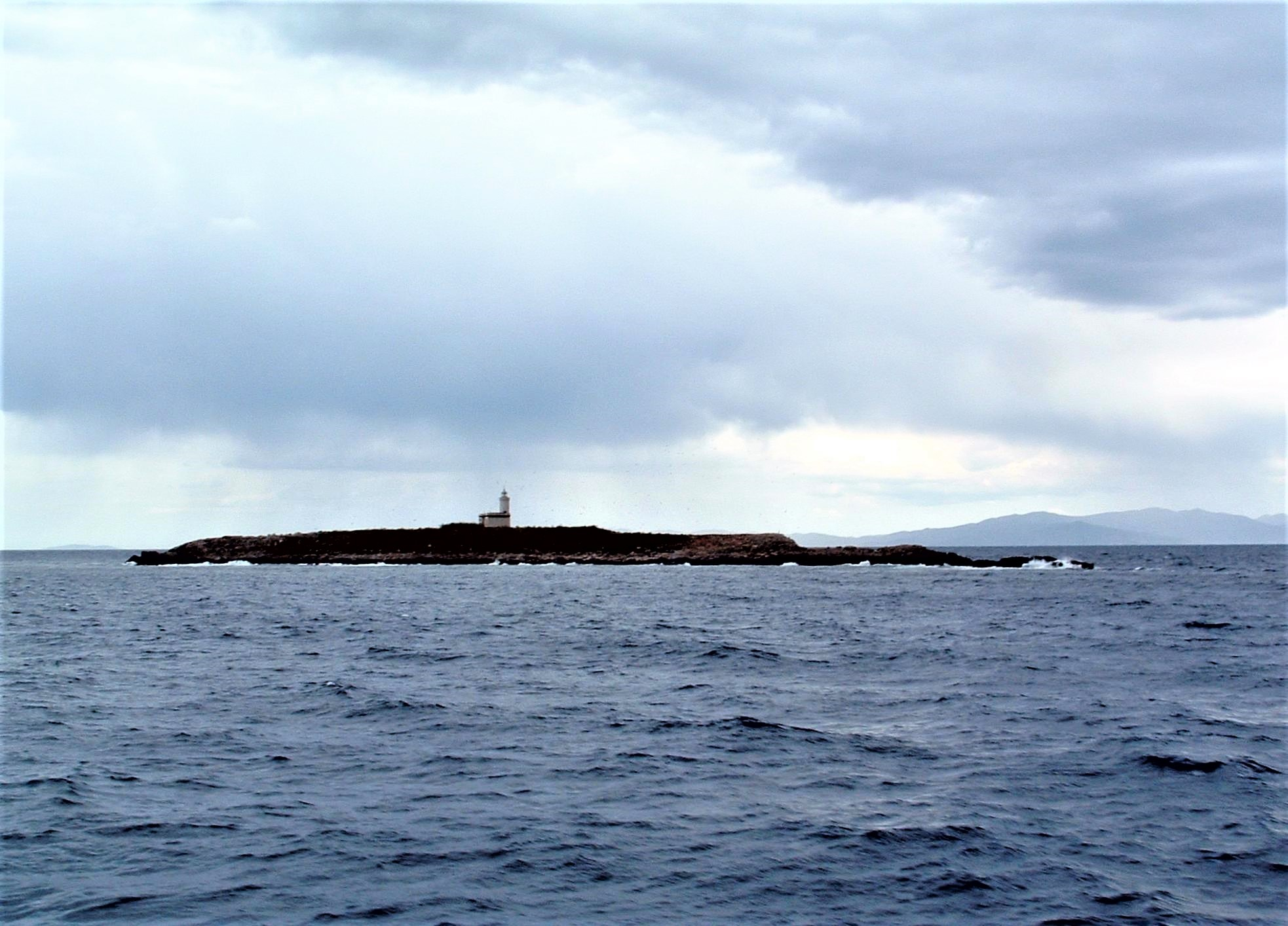
- The largest of the Formiche di Grosseto with the lighthouse

- Location within Tuscany

Geography
- Location: Tyrrhenian Sea
- Coordinates: 42°34′35.2″N 10°52′55.1″E
- Archipelago: Tuscan Archipelago
- Total islands: 3
- Major islands: Formica Grande
- Area: 0.12 km^{2} (0.046 sq mi)
- Highest elevation: 13 m (43 ft)

Administration
- Italy
- Region: Tuscany
- Province: Grosseto
- Comune: Grosseto

Demographics
- Population: uninhabited

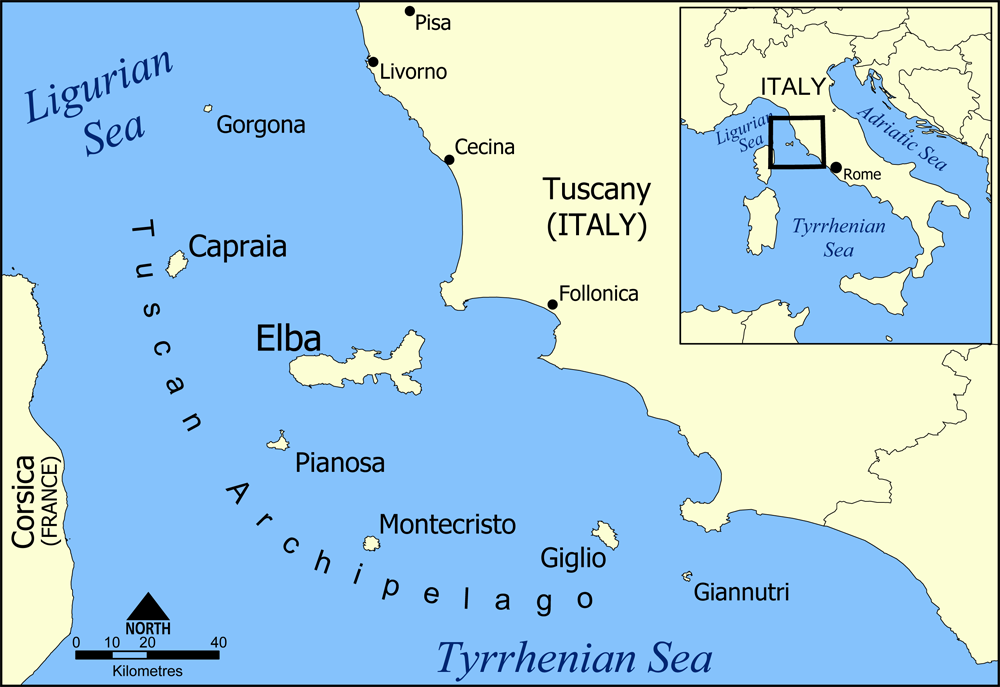
Map of the Tuscan Archipelago

The Formiche di Grosseto ("Ants of Grosseto") is a group of islets which emerge sharply in the Tuscan Archipelago, in front of the city of Grosseto, Italy. They are located in open sea among the coast of the Natural Park of Maremma and Pianosa, approximately 13 nautical miles (24 km) from Porto Santo Stefano on Monte Argentario and 9.4 miles (15.1 km) from Marina di Grosseto; they are part of the comune of Grosseto and are placed in a nature reserve which makes part of a special protection area.

== Description ==
The Formiche di Grosseto are three islets named, according to their dimensions, Formichino, Formica Media and Formica Grande which develop a total surface of about 120,000 square metres which extend lined up from north-west to south-east over one mile. Formichino is the smallest and is formed by two skerries, is the southernmost and has an area of only 20 square metres. Formica Media is a long narrow strip of rock that continues under water situated on a shoal. Formica Grande is the largest, has a rhomboidal shape, it is 370 metres long and 230 metres wide, is the northernmost and home the Scoglio Formiche di Grosseto lighthouse. The island has three old docking points on three different sides to permit the mooring depending on the wind and is equipped with a helipad utilized for the maintenance of the lighthouse.

== Flora and fauna ==
The Formiche di Grosseto is a place enjoyed by scuba divers for the richness of its waters. The seabed is prosperous in sponges, gorgoniidae, sabella spallanzanii and in fishes as grouper, sarago, conger, muraena, astice and lobster.

== See also ==
- List of islands of Italy
- Scoglio Formiche di Grosseto Lighthouse

== Gallery ==
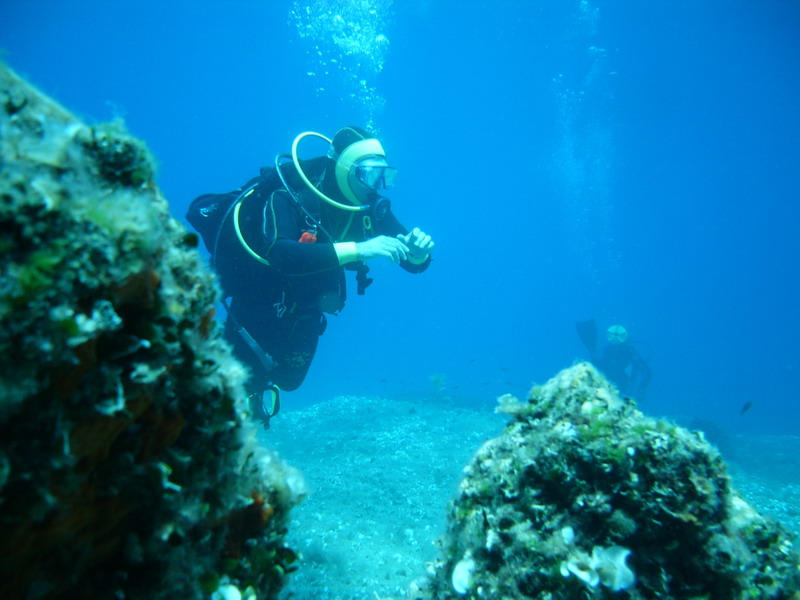
Diving at Formiche di Grosseto

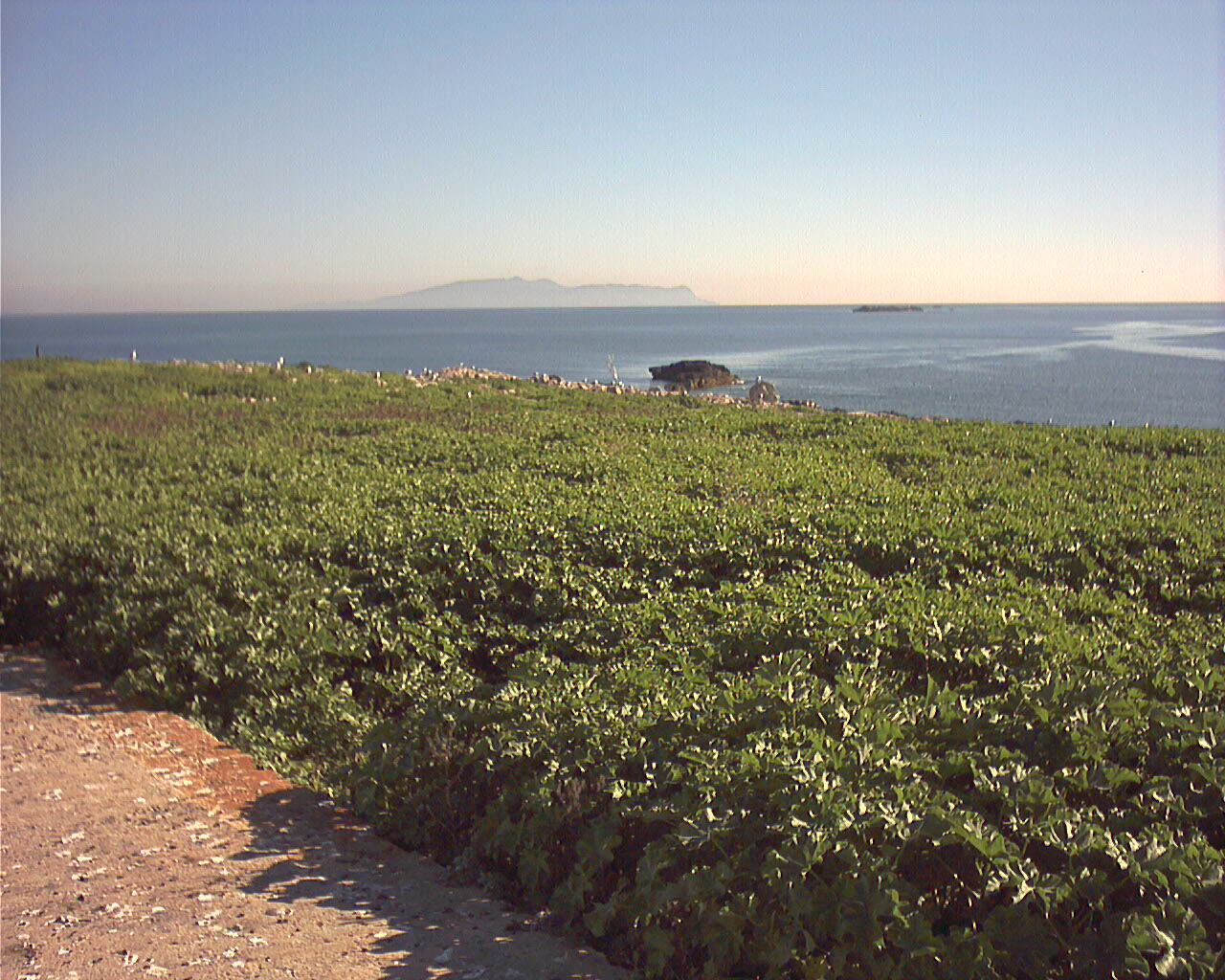
View from Formica grande
