= Cheradi Islands =

Group of islands in the Ionian Sea off the coast of Italy

Coordinates: 40.443°N 17.168°E

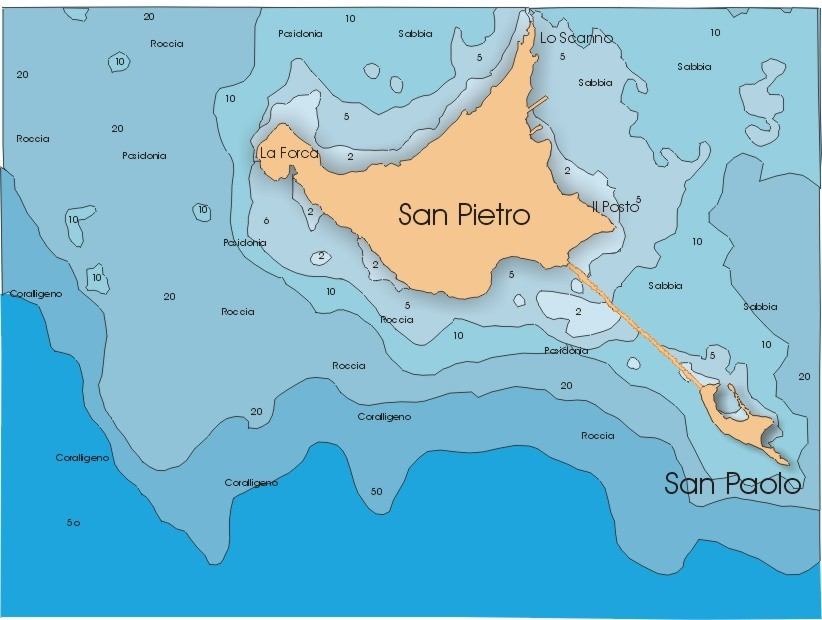
Map of Cheradi Islands

The Cheradi Islands (Italian: Isole Cheradi) in the Gulf of Taranto are a small archipelago of the harbor basin of the Mar Grande of Taranto. The island group consists of the two islands of San Pietro and San Paolo. Previously, there was still a third island, San Nicolicchio, but was destroyed through the expansion of the cargo port. Administratively, the islands belong to the old town of Taranto (municipality III Città Vecchia - Borgo).

== See also ==
- List of islands of Italy
