= Barrettini =

Island in Italy

Coordinates: 41°17′N 9°24′E

Geography
- Location: Tyrrhenian Sea
- Archipelago: Maddalena archipelago

Administration
- Italy
- Autonomous region: Sardinia
- Province: Gallura North-East Sardinia

Barrettini is a small island of the Italian autonomous region of Sardinia. It is just north of the island of Sardinia. It is located east of Budelli on the north eastern part of Sardinia on the Tyrrhenian Sea.

== Weather ==
Winters on the island can get very cold. One of the coldest months is February, and July is usually the sunniest month. Various types of precipitation occur throughout the year.

== Events ==
In 1993, a French ferry crashed into the island.

== See also ==
- List of islands of Italy
