= Isola dei Cavoli Lighthouse =

Lighthouse in Italy

Isola dei Cavoli
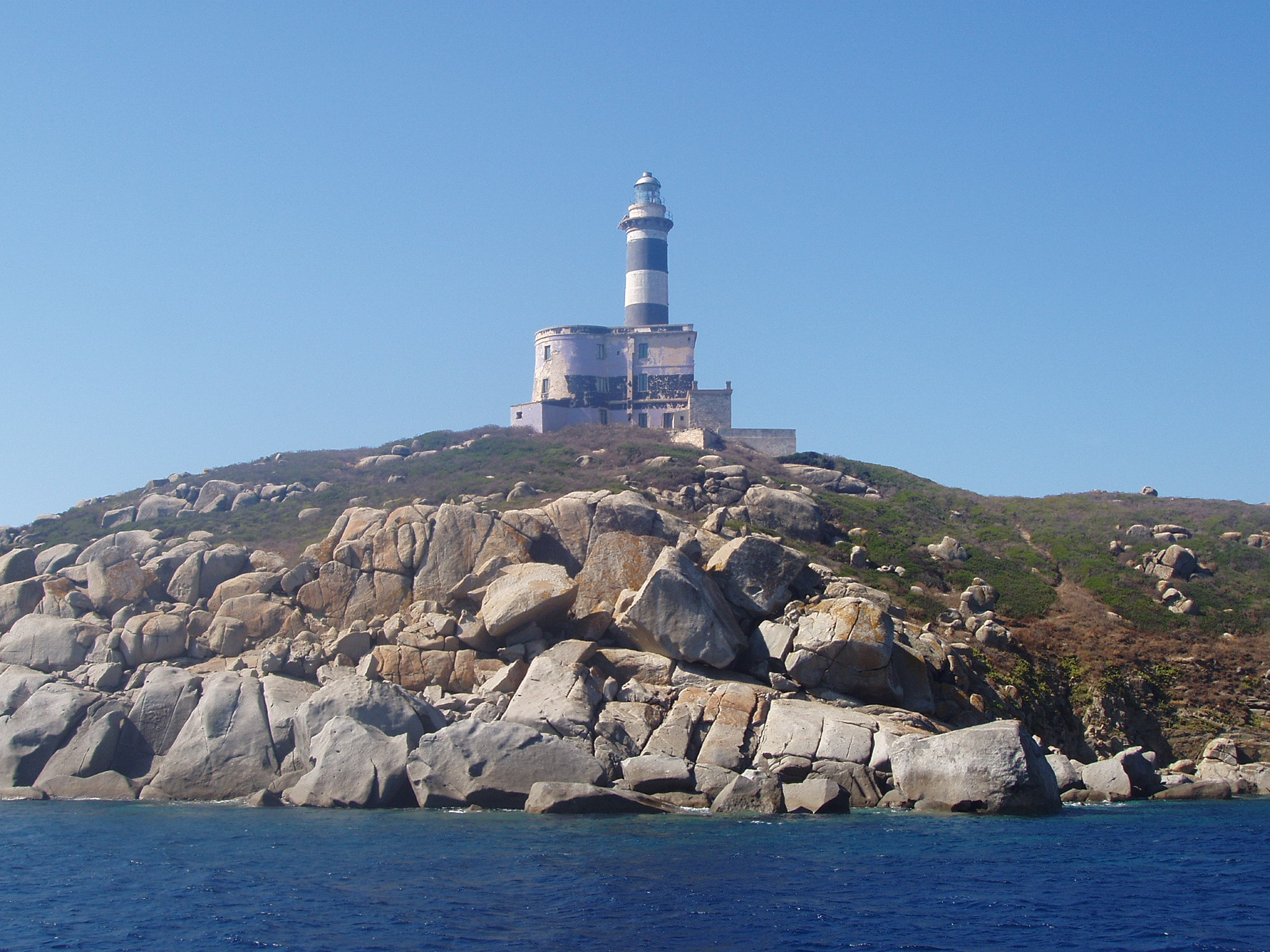
- Isola dei Cavoli Lighthouse
- Location: Isola dei Cavoli; Villasimius; Sardinia; Italy
- Coordinates: 39°05′19″N 9°32′00″E

Tower
- Constructed: 1858
- Foundation: masonry base
- Construction: masonry tower
- Automated: yes
- Height: 37 metres (121 ft)
- Shape: cylindrical tower with balcony and lantern atop a 3-storey keeper's house
- Markings: white and black horizontal bands tower, white lantern, grey metallic lantern dome
- Power source: solar power
- Operator: Marina Militare
- Fog signal: no

Light
- Focal height: 74 metres (243 ft)
- Intensity: LED MBL 400
- Range: 11 nautical miles (20 km; 13 mi)
- Characteristic: Fl (2) WR 10s.
- Italy no.: 1262 E.F.

Isola dei Cavoli Lighthouse (Italian: Faro di Isola dei Cavoli) is an active lighthouse located on a small islet, 690 metres (2,260 ft) from Cape Carbonara, the southeasternmost tip of Sardinia in the municipality of Villasimius on the Tyrrhenian Sea.

== Description ==
The lighthouse was built in 1858 and consists of a masonry cylindrical tower, 37 metres (121 ft) high, with balcony and lantern atop a massive 3-storey keeper's house. The tower is painted with white and black horizontal band, the lantern in white and the lantern dome in grey metallic. The light is positioned at 74 metres (243 ft) above sea level and emits two white or red flashes, depending on the directions, in a 10 seconds period visible up to a distance of 11 nautical miles (20 km; 13 mi). The lighthouse is completely automated, powered by a solar unit and managed by the Marina Militare with the identification code number 1262 E.F. The lighthouse, being automated, it is no longer inhabited by the keepers consequently host the botanical and zoological research centre of the University of Cagliari.

== See also ==
- List of lighthouses in Italy
