= Isola della Bocca Lighthouse =

Lighthouse in Sardinia, Italy

Isola della Bocca
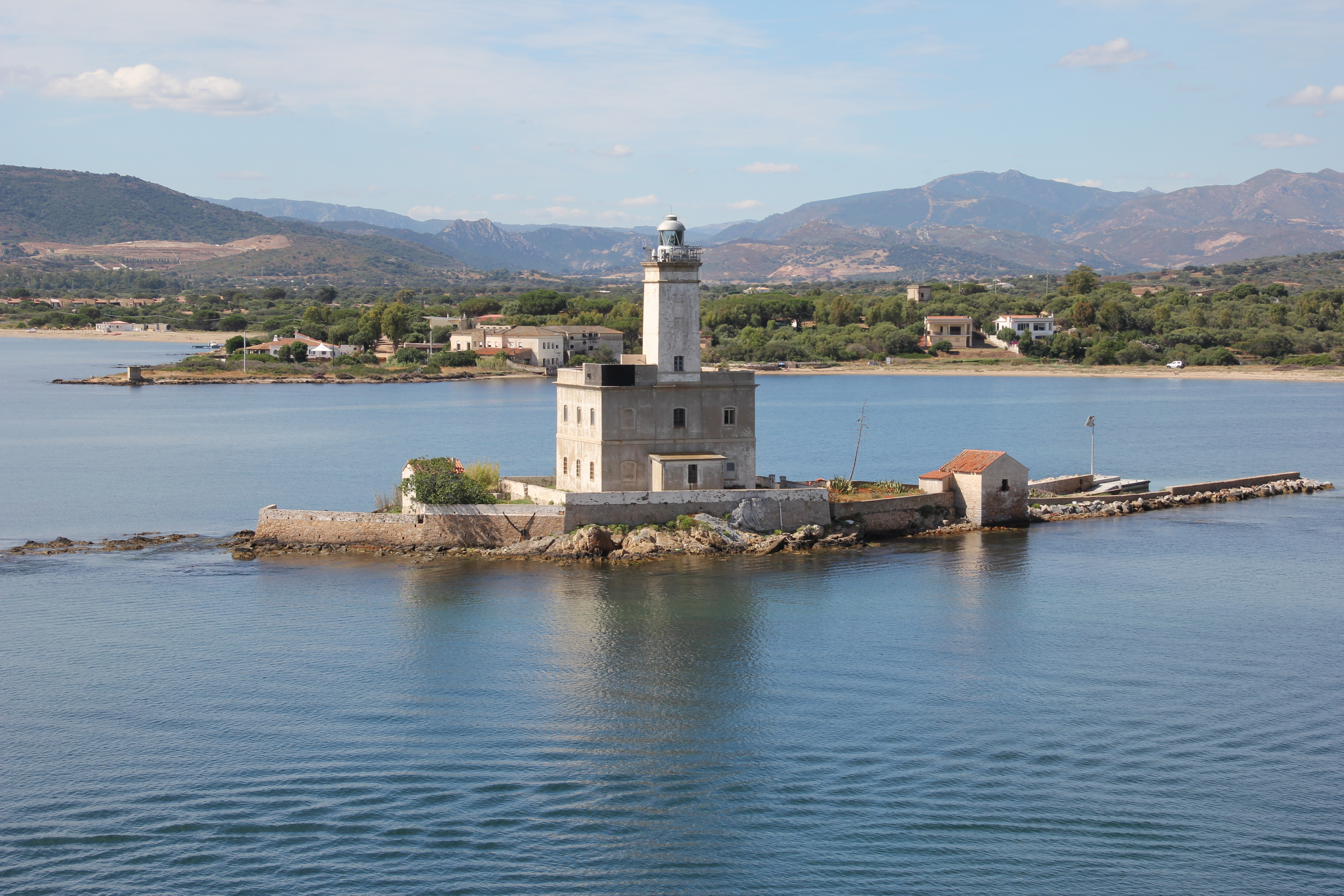
- Isola della Bocca Lighthouse
- Location: Isola della Bocca; Olbia; Sardinia; Italy
- Coordinates: 40°55′14″N 9°34′01″E

Tower
- Constructed: 1887
- Foundation: masonry base
- Construction: masonry tower
- Automated: yes
- Height: 22 metres (72 ft)
- Shape: quadrangular tower with balcony and lantern
- Markings: white tower and lantern, grey metallic lantern dome
- Power source: mains electricity
- Operator: Marina Militare
- Fog signal: no

Light
- Focal height: 24 metres (79 ft)
- Lens: Type TD 375; Focal length: 187,5mm
- Intensity: main: AL 1000 W reserve: LABI 100 W
- Range: main: 15 nautical miles (28 km; 17 mi) reserve: 11 nautical miles (20 km; 13 mi)
- Characteristic: L Fl W 5s. (temporary inactive)
- Italy no.: 1170 E.F.

Isola della Bocca Lighthouse (Italian: Faro di Isola della Bocca) is an active lighthouse located on a small islet, at the southern entrance of the outer Port of Olbia, 250 metres (820 ft) from the mainland, in the municipality of Olbia on the Tyrrhenian Sea.

== Description ==
The lighthouse was built in 1887 and consists of a masonry quadrangular tower, 22 metres (72 ft) high, with balcony and lantern atop the seaside of the keeper's house. The tower and the lantern are painted white and the lantern dome in grey metallic. The light is positioned at 24 metres (79 ft) above sea level and emits one white long flash in a 5 seconds period visible up to a distance of 15 nautical miles (28 km; 17 mi). The lighthouse is completely automated and managed by the Marina Militare with the identification code number 1170 E.F.

== See also ==
- List of lighthouses in Italy
