= Scoglio Formiche di Grosseto Lighthouse =

Scoglio Formiche di Grosseto
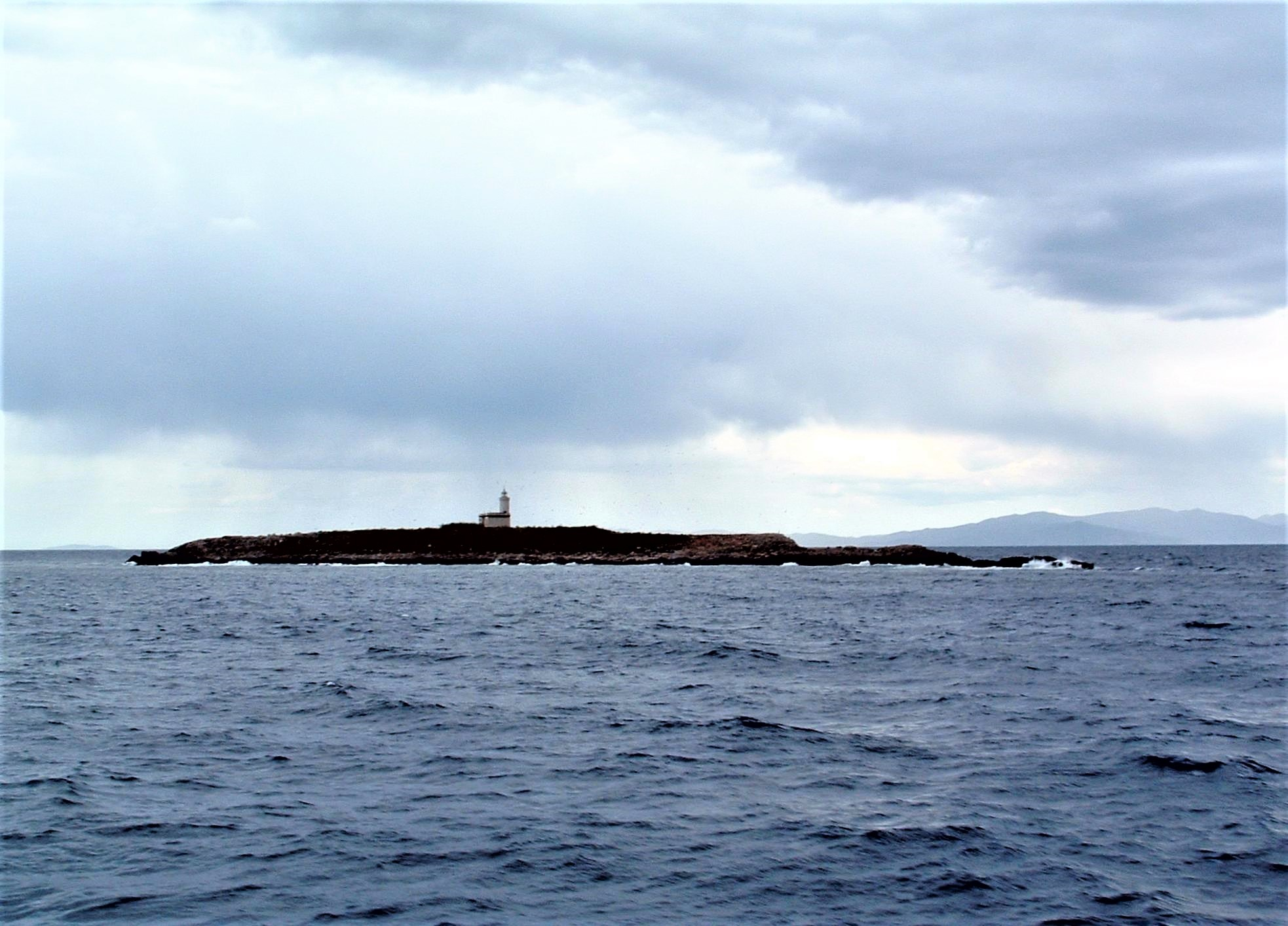
- Scoglio Formiche di Grosseto Lighthouse
- Location: Marina di Grosseto; Tuscany; Italy
- Coordinates: 42°34′35″N 10°52′55″E

Tower
- Constructed: 1919
- Foundation: cobrete base
- Construction: concrete and brick tower
- Height: 39 feet (12 m)
- Shape: cylindrical tower with lantern and gallery on one-story keeper’s house
- Markings: white tower
- Power source: solar power
- Operator: Marina Militare

Light
- Focal height: 75 feet (23 m)
- Lens: Type OF
- Intensity: LABI 100 W
- Range: 10 nautical miles (19 km; 12 mi)
- Characteristic: FI W 6s.
- Italy no.: 2136 E.F

Scoglio Formiche di Grosseto Lighthouse Italian: Faro delle Formiche di Grosseto is an active lighthouse established on the largest of three skerries located 9 nautical miles (17 km; 10 mi) south west of Marina di Grosseto.

== Description ==
The lighthouse and the keeper’s house were built in 1901 and restored in 1919 by the Regia Marina. The lighthouse consists of a white building and a cylindrical tower, with balcony and lantern, 12 metres (39 ft) high built on the front side. The power is supplied by a solar panel and the lantern emits one single white flash every 6 seconds visible up to 11 nautical miles (20 km; 13 mi). The lighthouse is fully automated and operated by Marina Militare identified by the code number 2136 E.F.

== See also ==
- List of lighthouses in Italy
