= Isola Sant'Andrea Lighthouse =

Isola Sant'Andrea
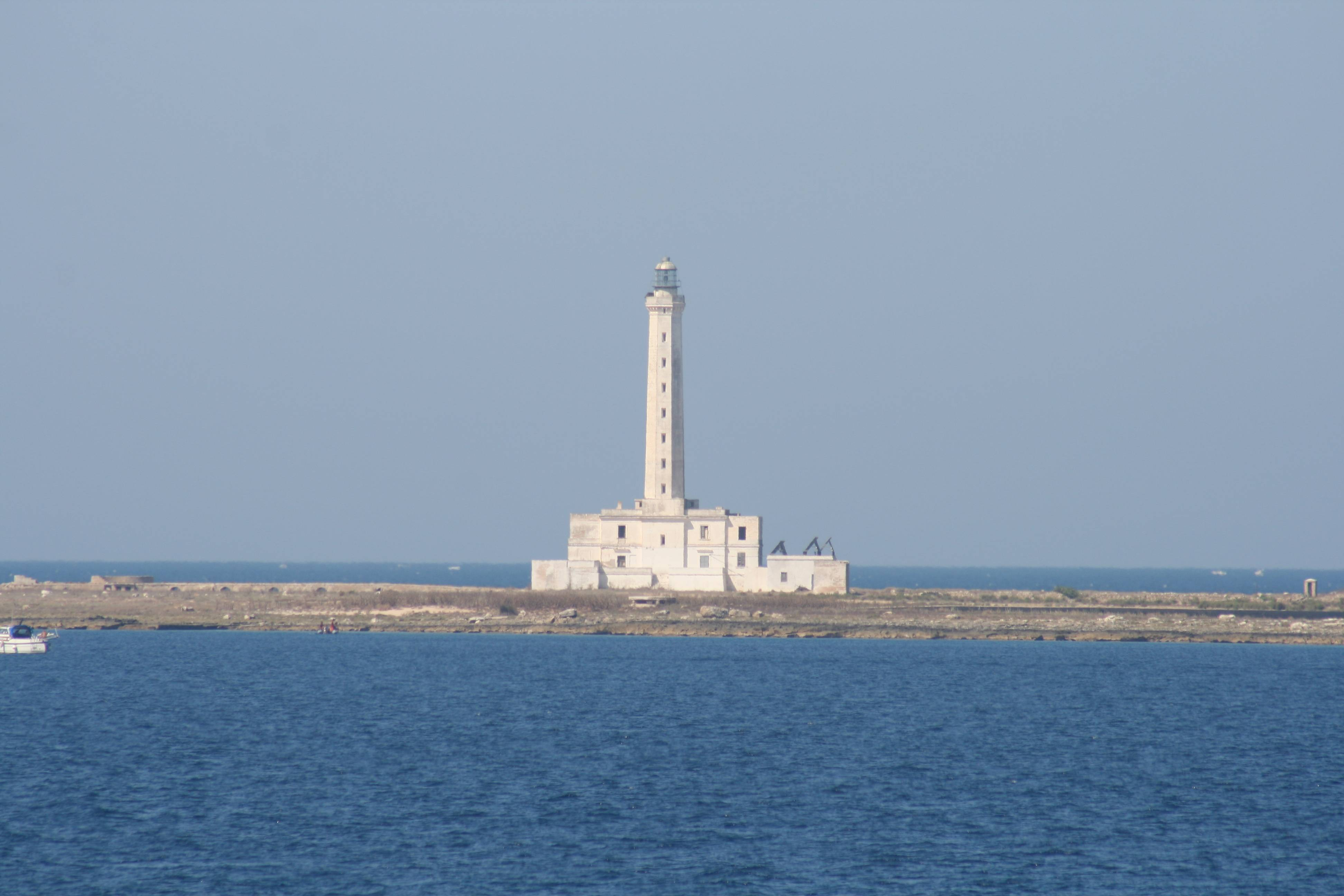
- Isola Sant'Andrea Lighthouse
- Location: Gallipoli; Apulia; Italy
- Coordinates: 40°02′50″N 17°56′44″E

Tower
- Constructed: 1865
- Foundation: concrete base
- Construction: concrete tower
- Automated: yes
- Height: 43 metres (141 ft)
- Shape: octagonal prism tower with balcony and lantern
- Markings: white tower, grey metallic lantern dome
- Power source: solar power
- Operator: Marina Militare
- Fog signal: no

Light
- Focal height: 45 metres (148 ft)
- Lens: Type OR250 focal length: 125 mm
- Intensity: main: AL 250 W reserve: MRB 300LED
- Range: main: 19 nautical miles (35 km; 22 mi) reserve: 15 nautical miles (28 km; 17 mi)
- Characteristic: Fl (2) W 10s.
- Italy no.: 3562 E.F.

Isola Sant'Andrea Lighthouse (Italian: Faro di Isola Sant'Andrea) is an active lighthouse located on a flat islet, the Isola Sant'Andrea, positioned at 0.8 nautical miles (1.5 km; 0.92 mi) from Gallipoli on the Ionian Sea.

== Description ==
The lighthouse was built in 1865 and consists of a white octagonal prism tower, 43 feet (13 m) high, with balcony and lantern, rising from a 2-storey white keeper's house. The lantern, painted in grey metallic, is positioned at 45 metres (148 ft) above sea level and emits two white flashes in a 10 seconds period, visible up to a distance of 19 nautical miles (35 km; 22 mi). The lighthouse is completely automated and is managed by the Marina Militare with the identification code number 3562 E.F.

== See also ==
- List of lighthouses in Italy
- Gallipoli
