= Barrettinelli di Fuori Lighthouse =

Barrettinelli di Fuori
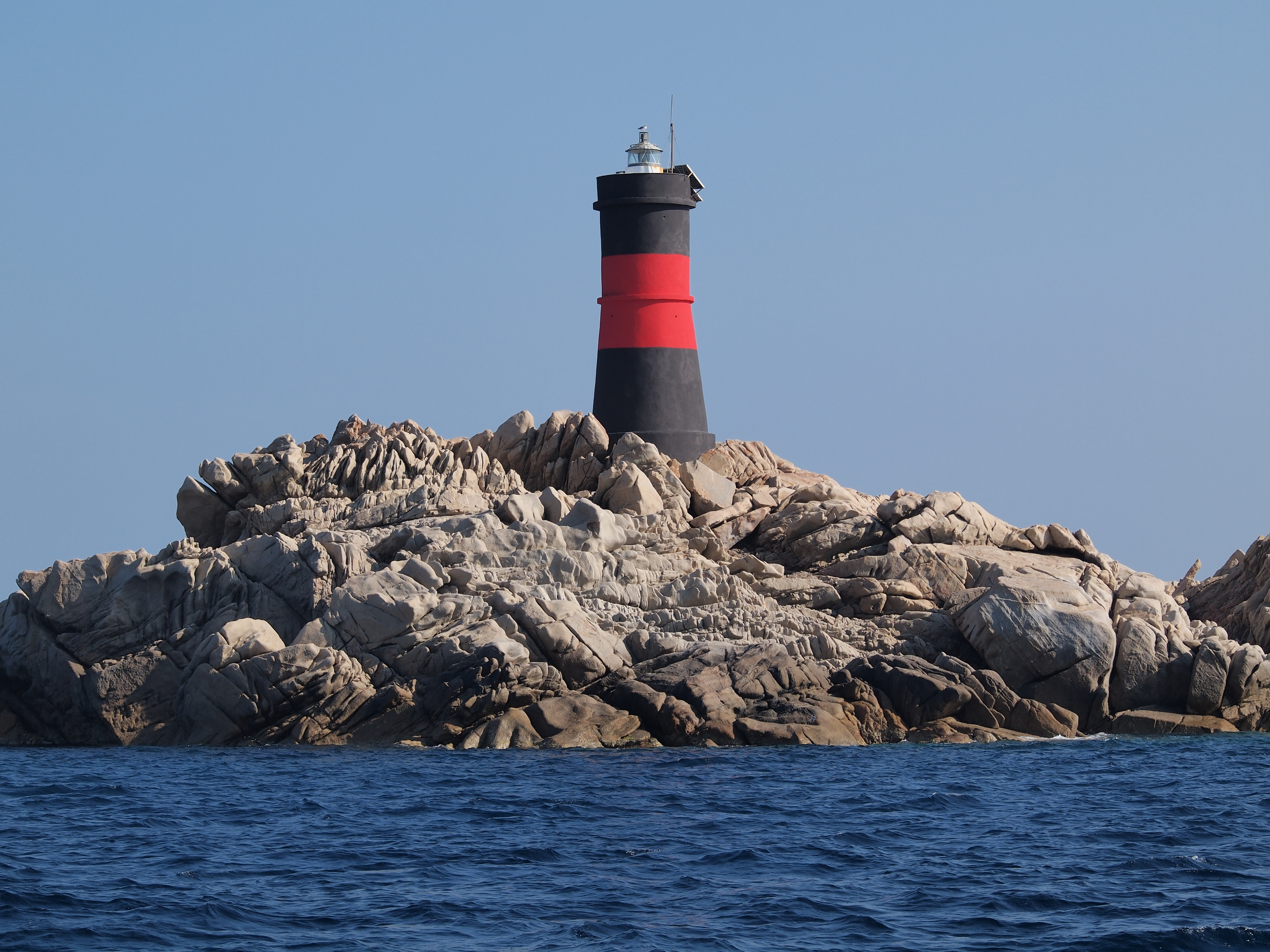
- Barrettinelli di Fuori Lighthouse
- Location: Maddalena archipelago Sardinia; Italy
- Coordinates: 41°18′06″N 9°24′03″E

Tower
- Constructed: 1936 (first)
- Construction: stone tower
- Automated: 1985
- Height: 12 metres (39 ft)
- Shape: cylindrical tower with balcony and lantern removed
- Markings: black tower with an horizontal red band
- Power source: solar power
- Operator: Marina Militare
- Fog signal: no

Light
- First lit: 1961 (current)
- Focal height: 22 metres (72 ft)
- Lens: Type TD 375; Focal length: 187,5 mm
- Intensity: MaxiHalo 60-EFF
- Range: 11 nautical miles (20 km; 13 mi)
- Characteristic: Fl (2) W 10 s.
- Italy no.: 1010 E.F.

Barrettinelli di Fuori Lighthouse (Italian: Faro di Barrettinelli di Fuori) is a light situated on the granitic Barrettinelli rocks, 103 metres (338 ft) long and 62 metres (203 ft) wide, in the Maddalena archipelago at 1.35 kilometres (0.84 mi) east of Isola Santa Maria and 300 metres (980 ft) north of Isola Corcelli.

== Description ==
The first lighthouse was built by Regia Marina in 1936, during World War II went destroyed; in 1960 was built a skeletal tower 10 metres (33 ft) high and the following year was substituted by the current lighthouse in stone. The tower, 12 metres (39 ft) high, is painted black with an horizontal central red band; the light is powered by a solar unit installed in 1985. The lantern, which mounts a Type TD 375 optics with a Focal length of 187,5mm, is positioned at 22 metres (72 ft) above sea level and emits two white flashes in a 10 seconds period visible up to a distance of 11 nautical miles (20 km; 13 mi). The lighthouse is completely automated and managed by the Marina Militare with the identification code number 1010 E.F.

== See also ==
- List of lighthouses in Italy
