= Sacca Fisola =

Artificial island

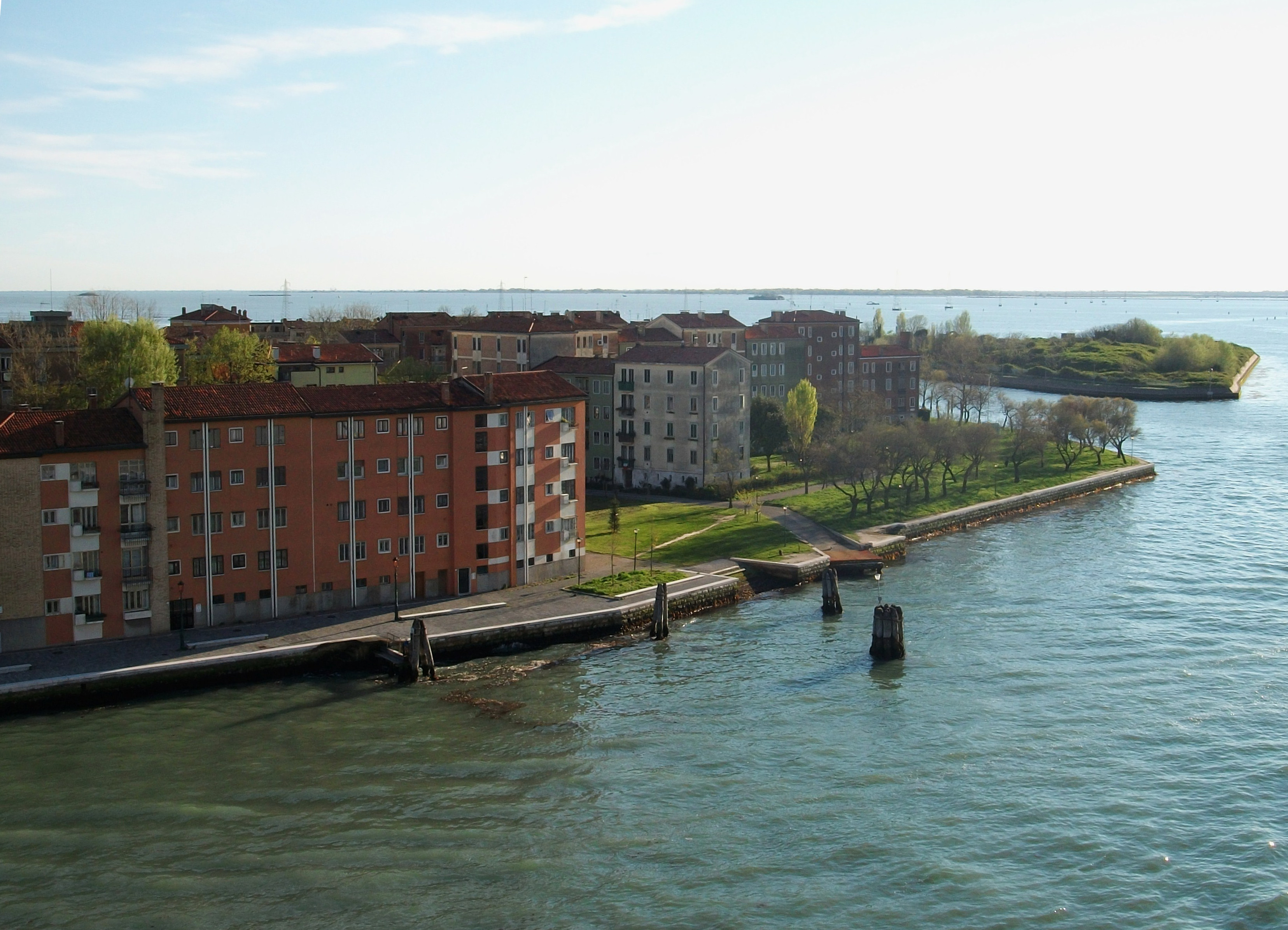
- View from the north

- Location within Venetian Lagoon

Geography
- Coordinates: 45.427612°N 12.31498°E
- Adjacent to: Venetian Lagoon

Administration
- Italy
- Region: Veneto
- Province: Province of Venice

Sacca Fisola is an artificial island in the Venetian Lagoon. It is a largely modern residential area.

== Geography ==
Sacca Fisola lies at the western end of the Giudecca—to which it is connected by bridge—and east of Sacca San Biagio. It is home to a public swimming pool.

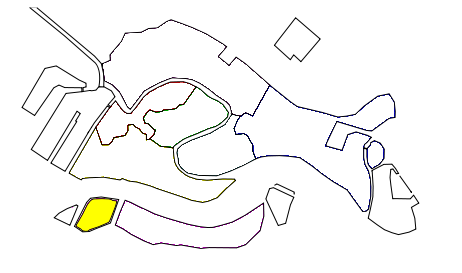
Location of Sacca Fisola in Venice

== Festivals and events ==
The island has a weekly Thursday market.

== Demographics ==
It has a reputation for the Communist leanings of its voting-age population.

== Gallery ==
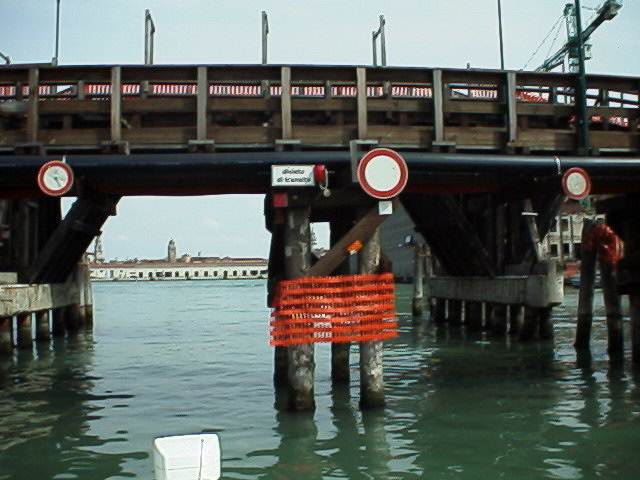
Bridge connecting Sacca Fisola with Giudecca

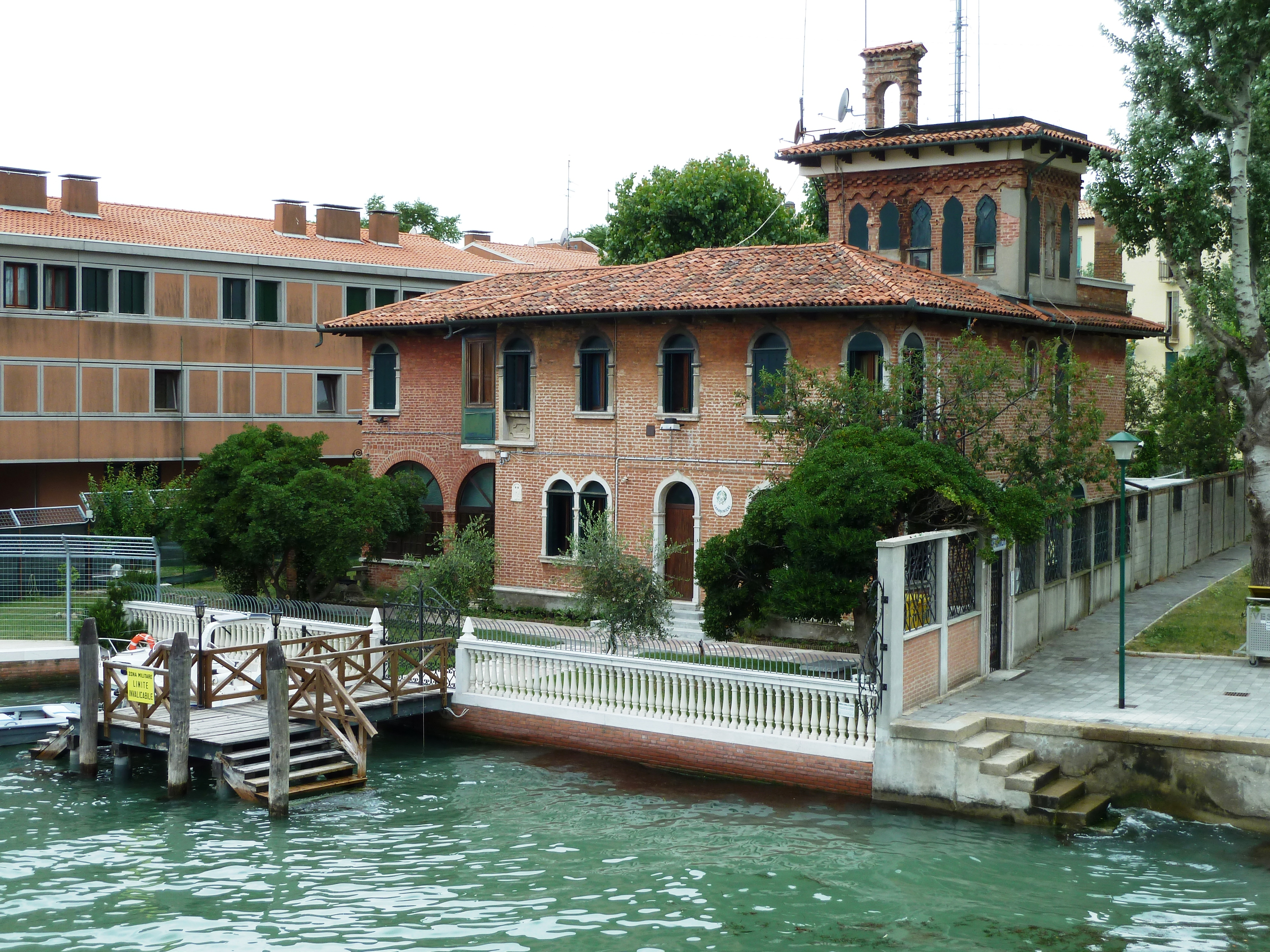
Carabinier barracks

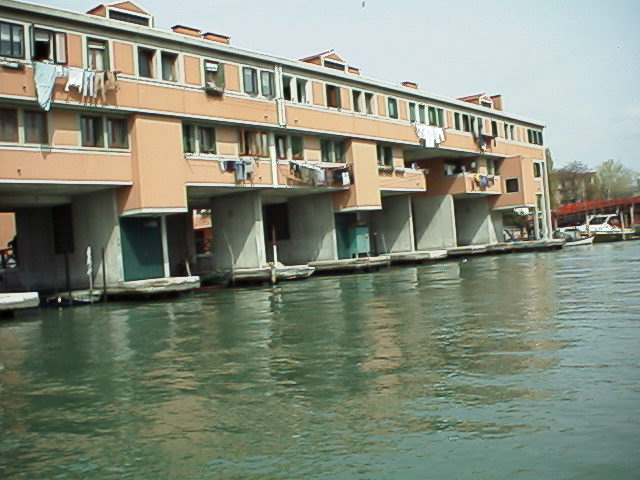
Houses

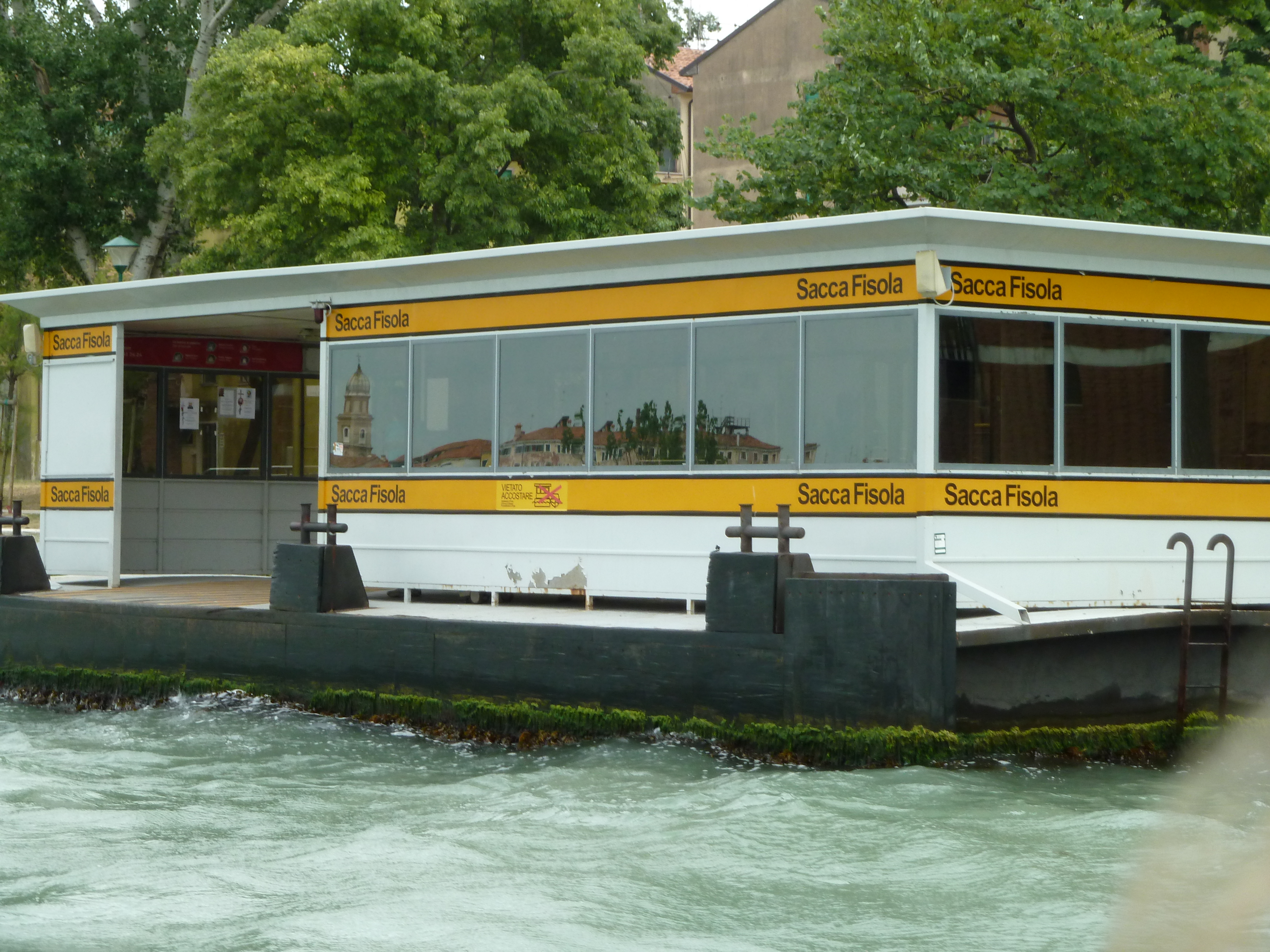
Boat stop
