= Sacca San Biagio =

Uninhabited island in the Venetian Lagoon

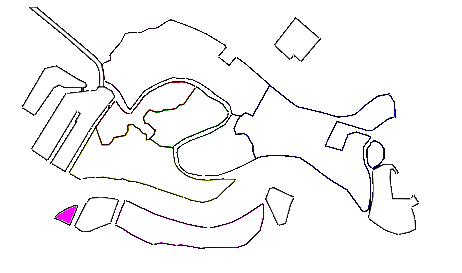

- Location within Venetian Lagoon

Geography
- Coordinates: 45.42682°N 12.30925°E

Administration
- Italy
- Region: Veneto
- Province: Province of Venice

Sacca San Biagio is an uninhabited island in the Venetian Lagoon which, like other "sacche" (Sacca Sessola, Sacca Fisola, etc.), is artificial. It lies immediately to the west of Sacca Fisola, to which it is connected by a bridge, and was built between the 1920s and the 1950s from trash.

It hosted a trash incinerator from 1973 to 1985. It is now being improved, with proposals for a theme park and cultural center.

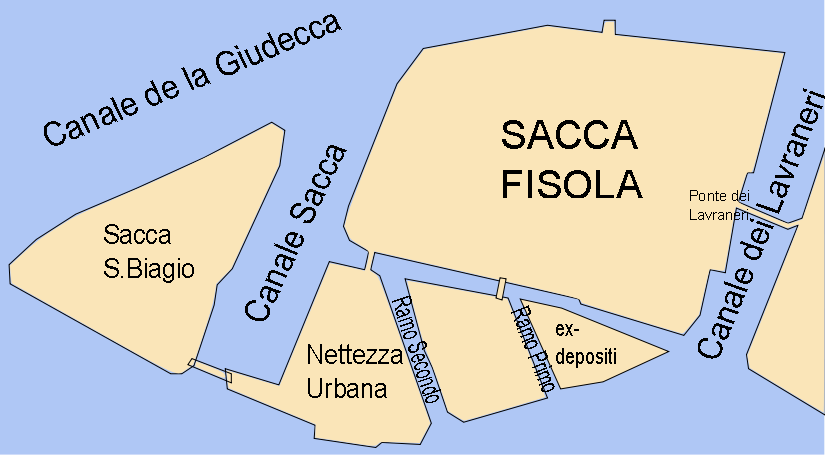
Map

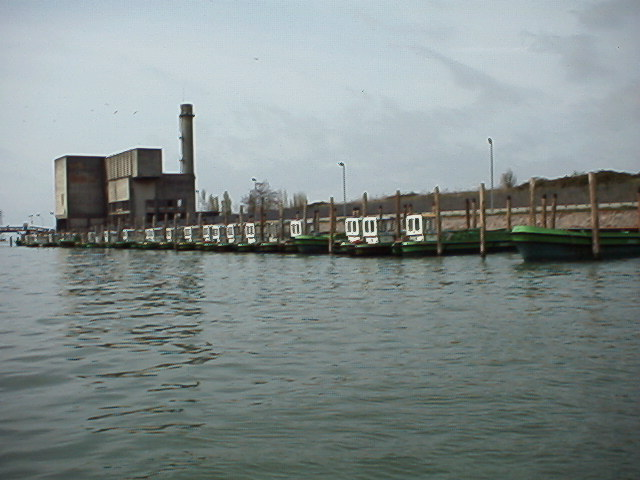
Sacca San Biagio with trash barges and the now-demolished incinerator
