= Climate of Italy =

Köppen climate classification types of Italy

The climate of Italy is highly diverse. In most of the inland northern and central regions, the climate ranges from humid subtropical to humid continental and oceanic. The climate of the Po Valley geographical region is mostly humid subtropical, with cool winters and hot summers. The coastal areas of Liguria, perience a Mediterranean climate according to the Köppen climate classification.

Between the north and south, there can be a considerable difference in temperature, especially during in winter: on some winter days, it can be −2 °C (28 °F) and snowing in Milan, while it is 8 °C (46.4 °F) in Rome and 20 °C (68 °F) in Palermo. Temperature differences are less extreme in the summer. On 11 August 2021, an agricultural monitoring station near Syracuse recorded 48.8 °C (119.8 °F) which constitutes the official record for the highest temperature in Europe according to the World Meteorological Organization.

Italy is experiencing widespread impacts of climate change, with an increase in extreme events such as thunderstorms heatwaves, droughts and more frequent flooding. For example, Venice is facing increasing issues due to sea level rise. Italy faces many challenges adapting to climate change including the economic, social, and environmental impacts that climate change creates, as well as an increasingly problematic death toll from the health risks that come with climate change.

== Generality ==
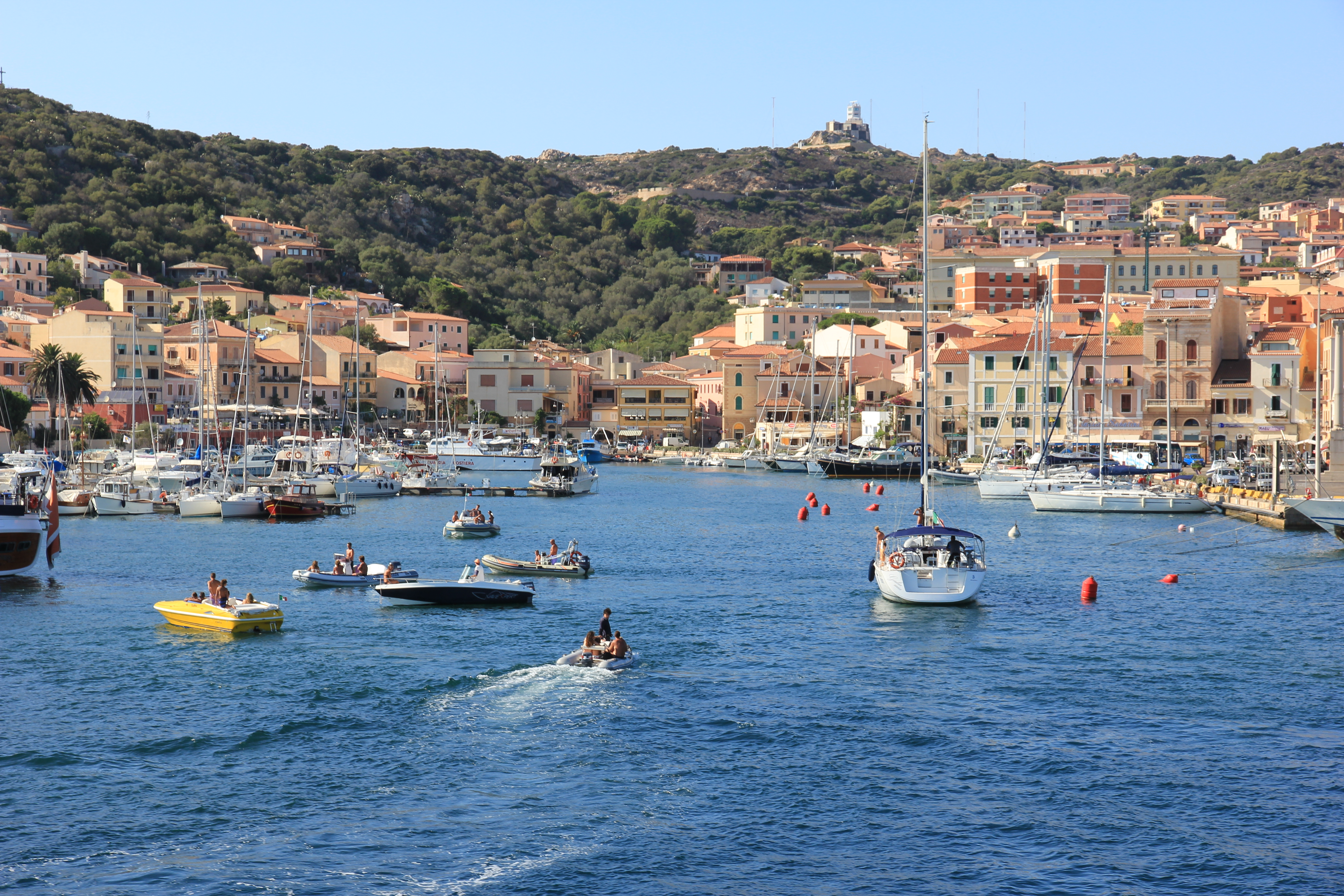
Summer in La Maddalena, Sardinia

The Italian climate is influenced by the Mediterranean Sea, a large body of water that surrounds Italy on every side except the north. This sea constitutes a reservoir of heat and humidity for Italy. Within the southern temperate zone, they determine a Mediterranean climate with local differences due to the geomorphology of the territory, which tends to make its mitigating effects felt, especially in high pressure conditions.

In addition to Mediterranean influences, the Italian climate is partly affected by the western currents, especially in the intermediate seasons, as well as by the dynamics in the Atlantic Ocean, with its cyclones that travel from west by the reciprocal position, on a synoptic level, of the Azores anticyclone and the African subtropical anticyclone. The cold winter air are in part influenced by the mountain ranges of the Alps and the Apennines. The mitigating effect of the Mediterranean is added to this condition, with a tendency to reinvigorate, due to the transfer of sensible heat and humidity, the weakened perturbations from the west or with the formation of Mediterranean Low or Mediterranean cyclogenesis.

== Geography ==
Topographic map of Italy

Italy is located in southern Europe and it is also considered a part of western Europe between latitudes 35° and 47° N, and longitudes 6° and 19° E. To the north, Italy borders Switzerland, France, Austria and Slovenia and is roughly delimited by the Alpine watershed, enclosing the Po Valley and the Venetian Plain. To the south, it consists of the entirety of the Italian Peninsula, crossed by the Apennines, and the two Mediterranean islands of Sicily and Sardinia, in addition to many smaller islands. The sovereign states of San Marino and Vatican City are enclaves within Italy, while Campione d'Italia is an Italian exclave in Switzerland.

Italy is part of the Northern Hemisphere. The country's total area is 301,230 square kilometres (116,306 sq mi), of which 294,020 km^{2} (113,522 sq mi) is land and 7,210 km^{2} (2,784 sq mi) is water. Including islands, Italy has a coastline of 7,900 km (4,900 mi) on the Adriatic Sea, Ionian Sea, Tyrrhenian Sea, Ligurian Sea, Sea of Sardinia and Strait of Sicily, and borders shared with France (488 km (303 mi)), Austria (430 km (267 mi)), Slovenia (232 km (144 mi)) and Switzerland (740 km (460 mi)). San Marino (39 km (24 mi)) and Vatican City (3.2 km (2.0 mi)), both enclaves, account for the remainder.

Over 35% of the Italian territory is mountainous. The Apennine Mountains form the peninsula's backbone, and the Alps form most of its northern boundary, where Italy's highest point is located on Mont Blanc summit (Monte Bianco) (4,810 m or 15,780 ft). Other worldwide-known mountains in Italy include the Matterhorn (Monte Cervino), Monte Rosa, Gran Paradiso in the West Alps, and Bernina, Stelvio and Dolomites along the eastern side. The Po, Italy's longest river (652 kilometres or 405 miles), flows from the Alps on the western border with France and crosses the Po Valley on its way to the Adriatic Sea. The Po Valley is the largest plain in Italy, with 46,000 km^{2} (18,000 sq mi), and it represents over 70% of the total plain area in the country.

== Description ==
Conditions on the coast are different from those in the interior, particularly during the winter months when the higher altitudes tend to be cold, wet, and often snowy. The coastal regions have mild winters and warm, and generally dry summers, although lowland valleys can be quite hot in summer. Average winter temperatures vary from 0 °C (32 °F) in the Alps to 12 °C (54 °F) in Sicily, so average summer temperatures range from 20 °C (68 °F) to over 25 °C (77 °F). Winters can vary widely across the country, with lingering cold, foggy and snowy periods in the north and milder, sunnier conditions in the south, summers can be hot and humid across the country, particularly in the south while northern and central areas can experience occasional strong thunderstorms from spring to autumn.

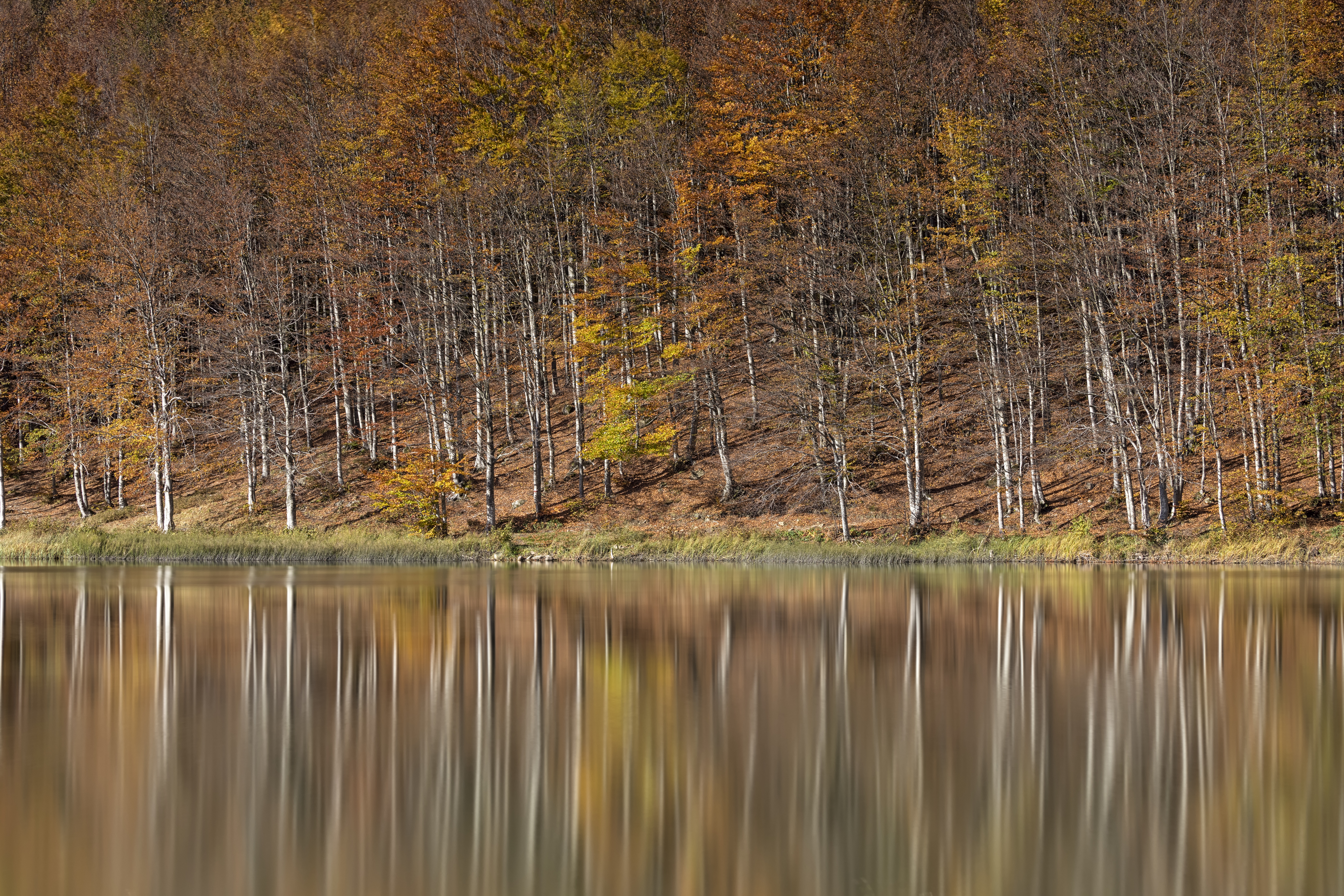
Lake Pranda in Tuscan–Emilian Apennines in October

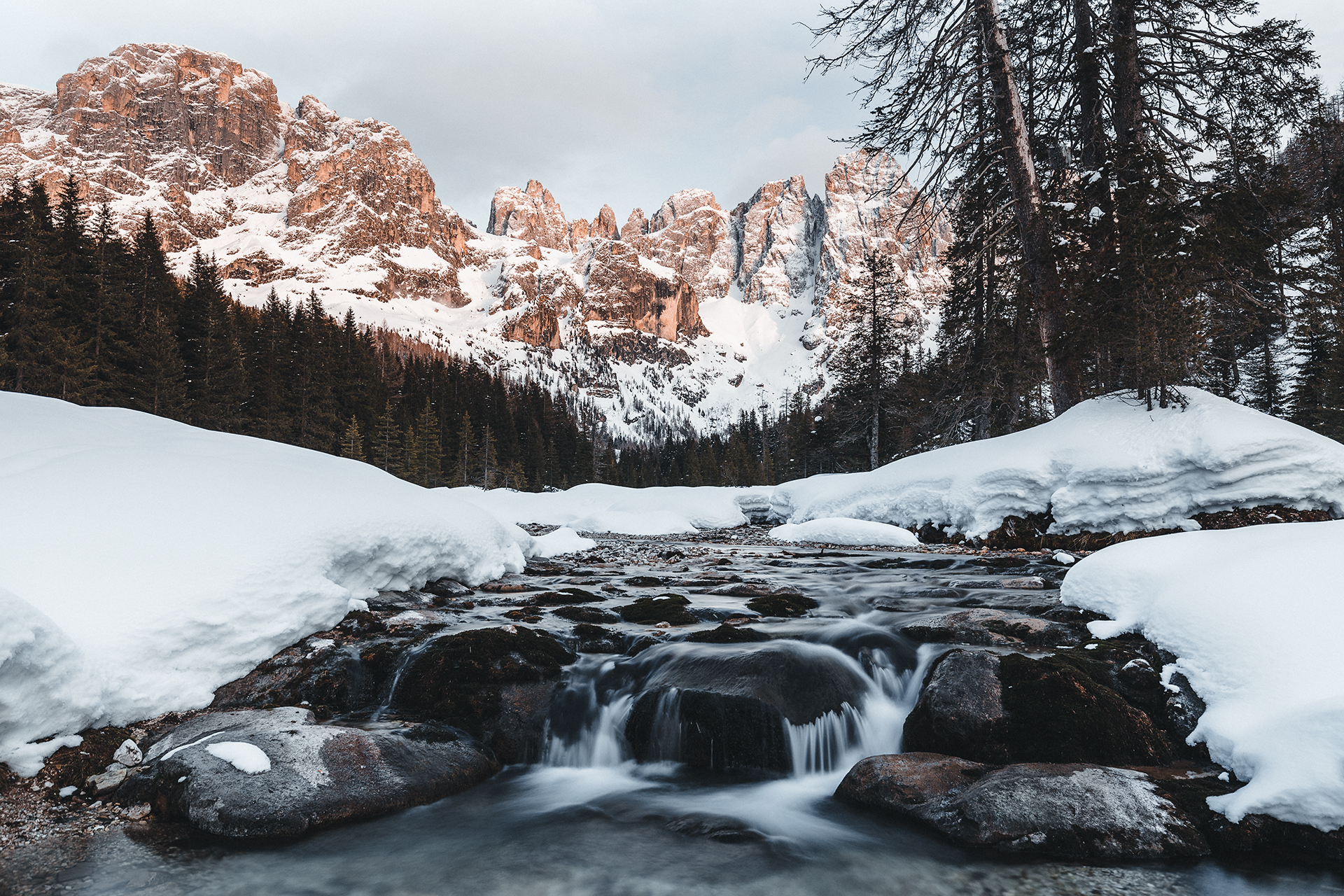
Nature reserve Paneveggio in Trentino in March

The east coast of the Italian Peninsula is not as wet as the west coast but is usually colder in the winter. The east coast north of Pescara is occasionally affected by the cold bora winds in winter and spring, but the wind is less strong here than around Trieste. During these frosty spells from E–NE, cities like Rimini, Ancona, Pescara and the entire eastern hillside of the Apennines can be affected by true "blizzards". The town of Fabriano, located just around 300 m (984 ft) at an elevation can often see 50–60 cm (20–24 in) of fresh snow fall in 24 hours during these episodes.

On the coast from Ravenna to Venice and Trieste, snow falls more rarely. During cold spells from the east, the cold wind can be harsh but with bright skies. During the snowfalls that affect Northern Italy, the Adriatic coast can see a milder Sirocco, wind which makes snow turn to rain. The mild effects of this wind often disappear just a few kilometres inland, and sometimes the coast from Venice to Jesolo sees snow while it is raining in Trieste and its surroundings, the Po River mouths and Ravenna. Rarely, the city of Trieste has experienced snow blizzards with north-eastern winds. In the colder winters, the Venice Lagoon may freeze, and in the coldest ones,it may even fareez enough to walk on the ice sheet (December 1788). Further south, snow may occur inland but it rarely happens at sea level, though snow at sea level has been recorded as far south as Sicily. Winters are generally milder in the coastal areas of the south, Sicily and Sardinia.

Summer is usually more stable, although the northern regions often have thunderstorms in the afternoon and night hours and some grey and rainy days. So, while south of Florence, the summer is typically dry and sunny; in the north, it tends to be more humid and cloudy. The humidity can make the northern plains particularly uncomfortable.

Spring and autumn weather can be very changeable, with sunny and warm weeks (sometimes with summer-like temperatures) suddenly interrupted by cold spells or followed by rainy and cloudy weeks.

== Sunshine duration, solar irradiance and cloud cover ==
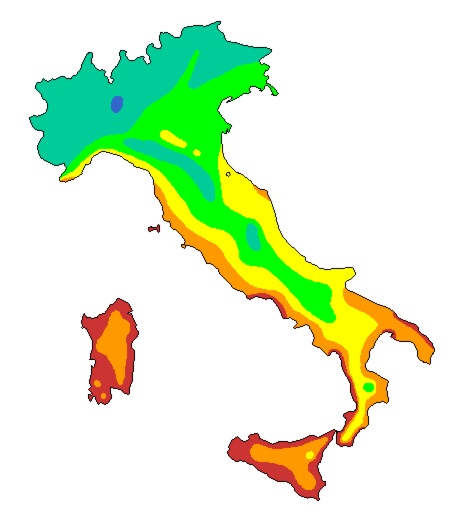
Map of the average annual sunshine duration in Italy (in hours)
< 1,799 h
1,800-1,999 h
2,000-2,199 h
2,200-2,399 h
2,400-2,599 h
> 2,600 h

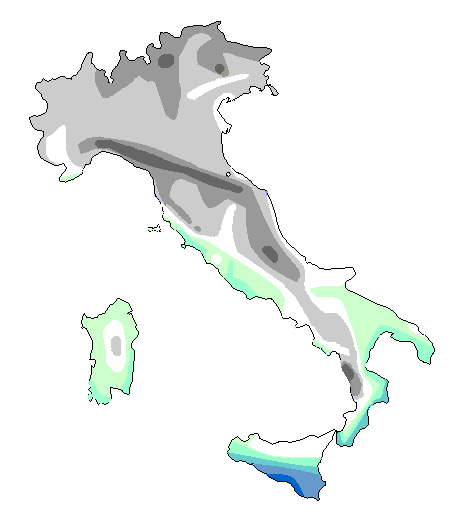
Map of the average annual cloud cover in Italy (in okta)
< 2,750 okta
2,750 - 3,000 okta
3,000 - 3,250 okta
3,250 - 3,500 okta
3,500 - 3,750 okta
3,750 - 4,000 okta
4,000 - 4,250 okta
4,250 - 4,500 okta
> 4,500 okta

Based on the maps of sunshine duration and on global solar irradiance in Italy, the areas with the highest values are the coasts of Sardinia, the western and southern coastal strip of Sicily, the whole of Apulia, south of Bari, and the coastal strips of the southern Tuscan Archipelago. All these areas have values of more than 2,600 hours of sunshine per year, with an average of more than seven hours per day.

On average, the northern and eastern coastal strip of Sicily, the innermost areas of Sardinia, the entire western peninsular coast to the south of Livorno, including the flat and hilly areas of the hinterland, the Ionian coast between Calabria and Basilicata, the inland areas of Lucania, the Adriatic coasts of Molise and the whole of northern Apulia, receive between 2,400 and 2,600 hours of sunshine per year (between 6.5 and seven hours per day).

Values between 2,200 and 2,400 hours of sunshine per year (between 6 and 6.5 hours per day) are recorded in the innermost areas of Sicily, in some sections of the Calabrian Ionian coast, and in the corresponding inland areas, along the Adriatic coast of Abruzzo, in Liguria, Versilia, the inland areas of northern and eastern Tuscany, in Umbria and in the hinterland of southern Lazio and Campania. All the other areas north of the imaginary oblique transversal line, drawn between the area immediately north of the city of Genoa and the border between Marche and Abruzzo, record annual average values that do not reach 2,200 hours or less than six hours per day.

The highest annual average values in the network of pyranometric stations relating to global solar irradiance are higher than 18 MJ/m^{2} (0.46 kWh/sq ft) and pertain to the southern and southeastern extremities of Sicily. Average annual values between 16 MJ/m^{2} (0.41 kWh/sq ft) and 18 MJ/m^{2} (0.46 kWh/sq ft) are recorded over a large part of the Aosta Valley, on the western alpine extremity of Piedmont, on the island of Pianosa, and in the coastal and sublittoral areas of the central and southern Lazio, in the south-central Apulia, Calabria, Sardinia and most of Sicily (including the islands of Ustica, Pantelleria and Lampedusa).

Average annual values between 14 MJ/m^{2} (0.36 kWh/sq ft) and 16 MJ/m^{2} (0.41 kWh/sq ft) affect western Liguria, a large part of Tuscany, and central-northern Lazio, a large part of the Marche, Abruzzo and Molise, Campania, Basilicata, northern Puglia and northeastern Sardinia. Average annual values between 12 MJ/m^{2} (0.31 kWh/sq ft) and 14 MJ/m^{2} (0.36 kWh/sq ft) occur in central-eastern Piedmont, eastern Liguria, Lombardy, Trentino-Alto Adige, Veneto, Friuli-Venezia Giulia, most of Emilia-Romagna and on the Apennine ridge between Emilia, Tuscany, Umbria, Marche and Lazio. Average annual values of less than 12 MJ/m^{2} (0.31 kWh/sq ft) are recorded in an area of the Tuscan-Emilian Apennines, which includes the highest peaks.

Cloud cover generally tends to reach the lowest average values in the month of July, while the highest average values, according to the different climatic zones, can occur several months between late autumn and the early part of spring, with the highest average values recorded in most of the territory in November.

== Precipitation ==
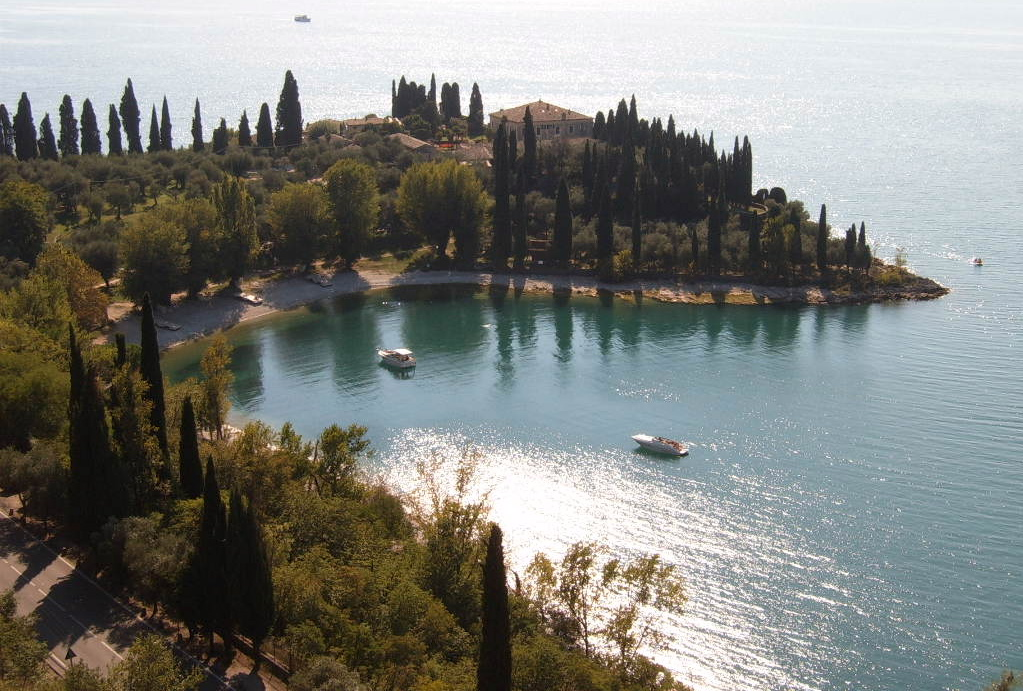
Lake Garda in spring

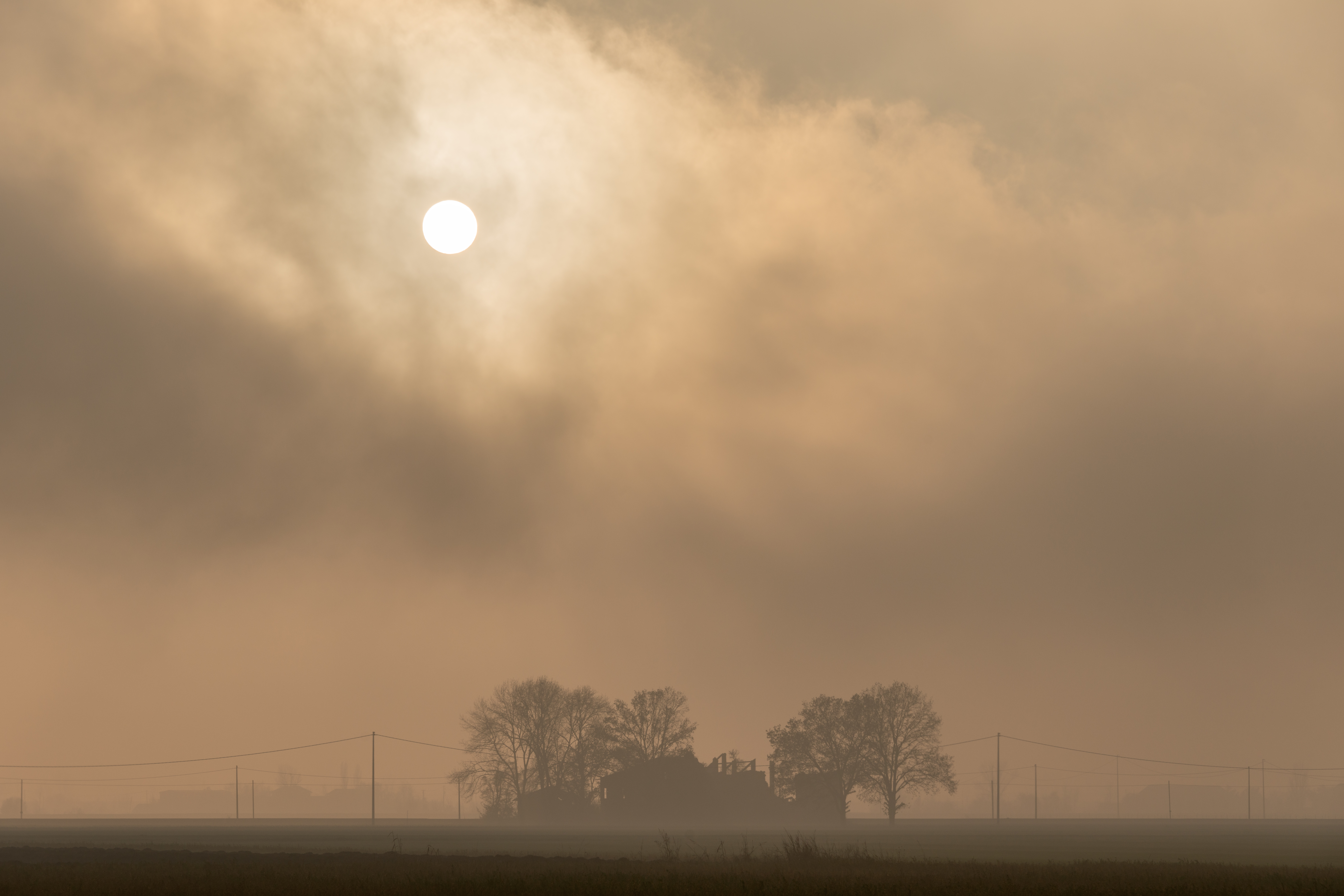
Fog in Po Valley is frequent during the winter time

In the south, summer marks a distinct dry season, characteristic of Mediterranean climates. This includes cities such as Naples, Rome, Bari, and Palermo. In the north, precipitation is more evenly distributed throughout the year, although the summer is usually slightly wetter. Between November and March, the Po Valley is often covered by fog, especially in the central zone (Pavia, Piacenza, Cremona, and Mantua), while the number of days with lows below 0 °C (32 °F) is usually from between 60 and 90 a year, with peaks of 100–110 days in the mainly rural zones.

Snow is quite common between early December and early March in cities like Turin, Milan, and Bologna, but sometimes it appears in late November or late March and even April. In the winter of 2005–2006, Milan received around 0.75–0.8 m (2 ft 5.53 in – 2 ft 7.50 in) or 75–80 cm (29.5–31.5 in) of fresh snow, Como around 1 m (3 ft 3.37 in) or 100 cm (39.4 in), Brescia 0.5 m (1 ft 7.69 in) or 50 cm (19.7 in), Trento 1.6 m (5 ft 2.99 in) or 160 cm (63.0 in), Vicenza around 0.45 m (1 ft 5.72 in) or 45 cm (17.7 in), Bologna around 0.3 m (11.81 in) or 30 cm (11.8 in), and Piacenza around 0.8 m (2 ft 7.50 in) or 80 cm (31.5 in)

Often, the largest snowfalls happen in February, sometime in January or March. In the Alps, snowfalls more in autumn and spring over 1,500 m (4,921 ft), because winter is usually marked by cold and dry periods; while the Apennines see many more snow falls during winter, but they are warmer and less wet in the other seasons.

Both mountain chains can see up to 5–10 m (16 ft 4.85 in – 32 ft 9.70 in) or 500–1,000 cm (196.9–393.7 in) of snow in a year at 2,000 m (6,562 ft). On the highest peaks of the Alps, snow may fall even during mid summer, and glaciers are present.

== Temperatures ==
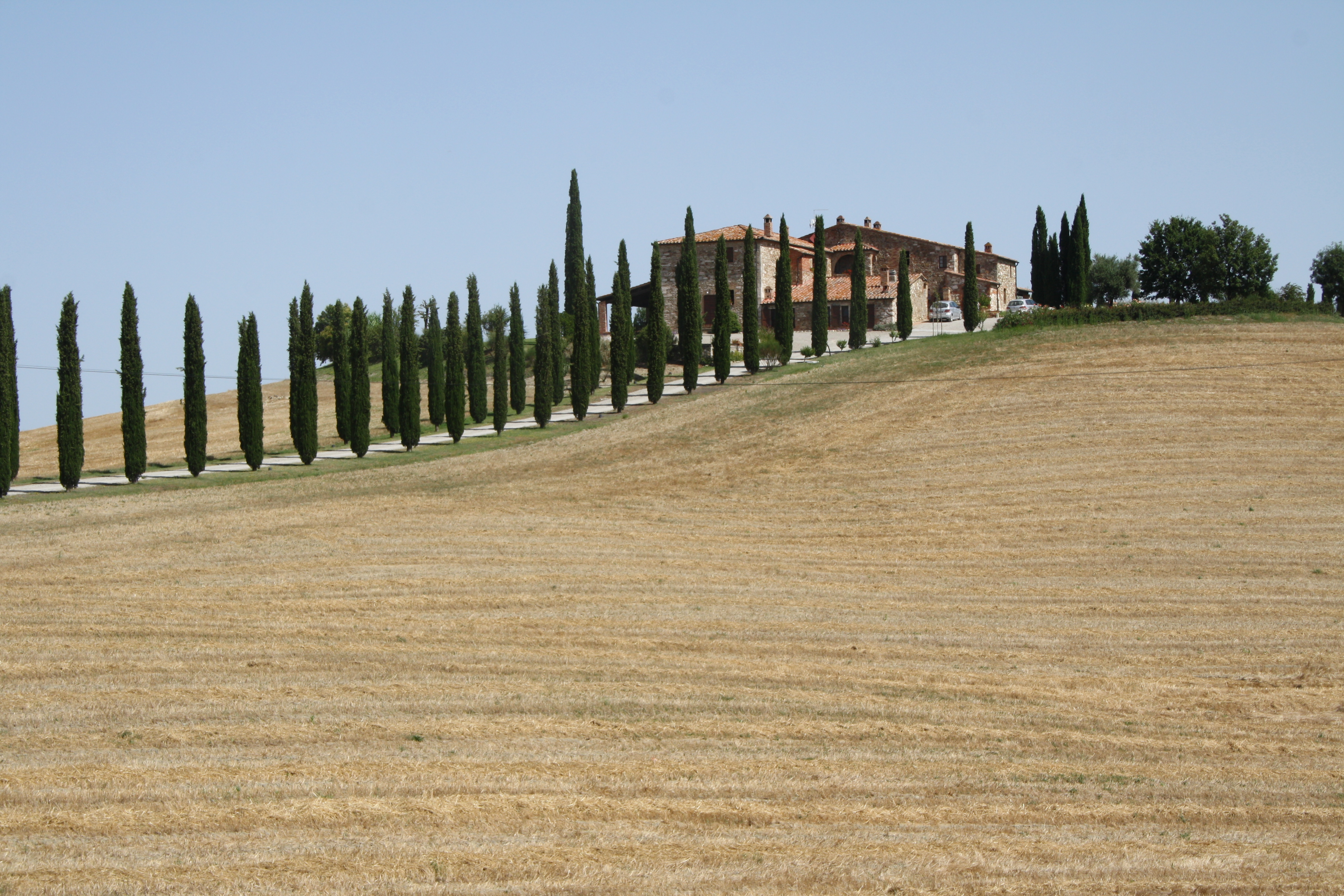
Tuscan landscape in Val d'Orcia during summer

Summer temperatures are often similar from north to south. July temperatures are 22–24 °C (71.6–75.2 °F) north of the River Po, as in Milan or Venice, and south of the River Po can reach 24–25 °C (75.2–77.0 °F) like in Bologna, with fewer thunderstorms; on the coasts of Central and Southern Italy, and in the nearby plains, mean temperatures range from 23 °C to 27 °C (80.6 °F). Generally, the hottest month is August in the south and July in the north; during these months, the thermometer can reach 38–42 °C (100.4–107.6 °F) in the south and 32–35 °C (89.6–95.0 °F) in the north; Sometimes the country can be split as during winter, with rain and 20–22 °C (68.0–71.6 °F) during the day in the north, and 30–40 °C (86–104 °F) in the south. However, having a hot and dry summer does not mean that Southern Italy will not see rain from June to August. Thunderstorms, while much more common in the humid north, occasionally also occur in the south. High humidity may keep nighttime temperatures high in Italy's cities during the summer months.

The coldest month is January: the Po Valley's mean temperature is between −1–1 °C (30.2–33.8 °F), Venice 2–3 °C (35.6–37.4 °F), Trieste 6–7 °C (42.8–44.6 °F), Florence 5–6 °C (41.0–42.8 °F), Rome 7–8 °C (44.6–46.4 °F), Naples 9 °C (48.2 °F), and Cagliari 12 °C (53.6 °F). Winter morning lows can occasionally reach −30 to −20 °C (−22.0 to −4.0 °F) in the Alps, −14 to −8 °C (6.8 to 17.6 °F) in the Po valley, −7 °C (19.4 °F) in Florence, −4 °C (24.8 °F) in Rome, −2 °C (28.4 °F) in Naples and 2 °C (35.6 °F) in Palermo. In cities like Rome and Milan, strong heat islands can exist, so that inside the urban area, winters can be milder and summers more sultry.

On some winter mornings it can be just −3 °C (26.6 °F) in Milan's Piazza del Duomo while −8 to −9 °C (17.6 to 15.8 °F) in the metropolitan outskirts, in Turin can be just −5 °C (23.0 °F) in the city centre and −10 to −12 °C (14.0 to 10.4 °F) in the metropolitan outskirts.

== Climates found in Italy ==
=== Hot semi-arid climate (BSh) ===
It is found in some areas of Sicily, Sardinia and the Pelagian Islands, for example in Lampedusa.

Climate data for Lampedusa
| Month | Jan | Feb | Mar | Apr | May | Jun | Jul | Aug | Sep | Oct | Nov | Dec | Year |
|---|---|---|---|---|---|---|---|---|---|---|---|---|---|
| Mean daily maximum °C (°F) | 15.1 (59.2) | 14.5 (58.1) | 15.3 (59.5) | 16.8 (62.2) | 19.5 (67.1) | 23.1 (73.6) | 26.0 (78.8) | 26.9 (80.4) | 25.6 (78.1) | 23.5 (74.3) | 20.2 (68.4) | 16.8 (62.2) | 20.3 (68.5) |
| Daily mean °C (°F) | 14.3 (57.7) | 13.7 (56.7) | 14.6 (58.3) | 16.1 (61.0) | 18.8 (65.8) | 22.4 (72.3) | 25.3 (77.5) | 26.2 (79.2) | 25.0 (77.0) | 22.8 (73.0) | 19.3 (66.7) | 16.0 (60.8) | 19.5 (67.2) |
| Mean daily minimum °C (°F) | 13.6 (56.5) | 12.9 (55.2) | 13.9 (57.0) | 15.4 (59.7) | 18.1 (64.6) | 21.6 (70.9) | 24.6 (76.3) | 25.6 (78.1) | 24.3 (75.7) | 22.0 (71.6) | 18.4 (65.1) | 15.2 (59.4) | 18.8 (65.8) |
| Average rainfall mm (inches) | 36.0 (1.42) | 32.0 (1.26) | 28.0 (1.10) | 7.0 (0.28) | 7.0 (0.28) | 3.0 (0.12) | 1.0 (0.04) | 4.0 (0.16) | 17.0 (0.67) | 51.0 (2.01) | 48.0 (1.89) | 36.0 (1.42) | 270 (10.65) |
| Average snowfall cm (inches) | 0 (0) | 0 (0) | 0 (0) | 0 (0) | 0 (0) | 0 (0) | 0 (0) | 0 (0) | 0 (0) | 0 (0) | 0 (0) | 0 (0) | 0 (0) |
| Average rainy days | 14 | 10 | 10 | 7 | 5 | 1 | 1 | 2 | 7 | 11 | 11 | 15 | 94 |
| Average snowy days | 0 | 0 | 0 | 0 | 0 | 0 | 0 | 0 | 0 | 0 | 0 | 0 | 0 |
| Average relative humidity (%) | 70 | 71 | 76 | 79 | 80 | 81 | 79 | 79 | 74 | 74 | 71 | 69 | 75 |
| Mean daily sunshine hours | 6 | 7 | 9 | 12 | 12 | 12 | 12 | 12 | 11 | 7 | 6 | 6 | 9 |
| Average ultraviolet index | 4 | 4 | 5 | 5 | 6 | 6 | 7 | 7 | 6 | 6 | 5 | 4 | 5 |
Source: Quando visitare, Lampedusa, Climate-Data, Lampedusa

=== Hot-summer Mediterranean climate (Csa) ===
It is found in all the coastal areas, excluding the northeastern area and the region of Liguria from Genoa to Savona, which have a Humid subtropical climate. The winter average varies from 6 °C (42.8 °F), in the northern areas, to 11–14 °C (51.8–57.2 °F) in the southern islands. During the summer, averages are near 23 °C (73.4 °F) in the north (Liguria) and sometimes reach 26–28 °C (78.8–82.4 °F) in the south. Precipitation mostly occurs during the winter. Snowfalls are rare and usually very light in the north, and almost never happen in the south. Summers are dry and hot. Main cities: Cagliari, Palermo, Naples, Rome, Pescara.

Climate data for Elmas-Cagliari (Elmas Airport), elevation: 5 m or 16 ft, 1981-2010 normals and extremes
| Month | Jan | Feb | Mar | Apr | May | Jun | Jul | Aug | Sep | Oct | Nov | Dec | Year |
|---|---|---|---|---|---|---|---|---|---|---|---|---|---|
| Mean daily maximum °C (°F) | 14.4 (57.9) | 15.0 (59.0) | 17.1 (62.8) | 19.5 (67.1) | 23.8 (74.8) | 28.2 (82.8) | 31.4 (88.5) | 31.7 (89.1) | 27.9 (82.2) | 23.7 (74.7) | 18.8 (65.8) | 15.5 (59.9) | 22.3 (72.1) |
| Daily mean °C (°F) | 9.9 (49.8) | 10.2 (50.4) | 12.1 (53.8) | 14.5 (58.1) | 18.4 (65.1) | 22.5 (72.5) | 25.6 (78.1) | 25.9 (78.6) | 22.7 (72.9) | 18.9 (66.0) | 14.3 (57.7) | 11.1 (52.0) | 17.2 (63.0) |
| Mean daily minimum °C (°F) | 5.4 (41.7) | 5.5 (41.9) | 7.2 (45.0) | 9.4 (48.9) | 13.1 (55.6) | 16.8 (62.2) | 19.7 (67.5) | 20.2 (68.4) | 17.5 (63.5) | 14.1 (57.4) | 9.9 (49.8) | 6.8 (44.2) | 12.2 (54.0) |
| Average rainfall mm (inches) | 30.8 (1.21) | 32.9 (1.30) | 28.6 (1.13) | 27.8 (1.09) | 18.3 (0.72) | 6.3 (0.25) | 2.3 (0.09) | 5.4 (0.21) | 24.0 (0.94) | 38.3 (1.51) | 49.5 (1.95) | 37.7 (1.48) | 301.9 (11.88) |
| Average snowfall cm (inches) | 0 (0) | 0 (0) | 0 (0) | 0 (0) | 0 (0) | 0 (0) | 0 (0) | 0 (0) | 0 (0) | 0 (0) | 0 (0) | 0 (0) | 0 (0) |
| Average rainy days | 5.5 | 5.2 | 4.7 | 5.1 | 3.6 | 1.2 | 0.6 | 1.1 | 3.7 | 5.5 | 7.8 | 6.6 | 50.6 |
| Average snowy days | 0 | 0 | 0 | 0 | 0 | 0 | 0 | 0 | 0 | 0 | 0 | 0 | 0 |
| Average relative humidity (%) | 79 | 77 | 75 | 73 | 71 | 67 | 65 | 65 | 71 | 77 | 79 | 80 | 73 |
| Mean daily sunshine hours | 5.6 | 6.4 | 7.9 | 9.6 | 11.2 | 12.8 | 12.8 | 11.9 | 9.8 | 7.8 | 6.3 | 5.6 | 9.0 |
| Average ultraviolet index | 3 | 3 | 4 | 4 | 5 | 6 | 7 | 6 | 6 | 5 | 4 | 3 | 5 |
Source 1: Meteo Climat, Servizio Meteorologico and WeatherBase
Source 2: Weather Spark, Cagliari Elmas Airport, Climate-Data, Cagliari Elmas Airport, Quando visitare, Cagliari

=== Warm-summer Mediterranean climate (Csb) ===
This climate is found inland and at medium to high elevations in southern Italy, around 1,000 meters (3,281 ft). It is similar to the typical Mediterranean climate: the summers are dry and the winters are wetter, but the temperatures are lower in both seasons – around 3 or 5 °C (37.4 or 41.0 °F) in the winter, and between 17 and 21 °C (62.6 and 69.8 °F) in the summer. Snowfalls are more common. Main cities and towns include Ariano Irpino, Potenza, San Giovanni in Fiore and Prizzi.

Climate data for Potenza
| Month | Jan | Feb | Mar | Apr | May | Jun | Jul | Aug | Sep | Oct | Nov | Dec | Year |
|---|---|---|---|---|---|---|---|---|---|---|---|---|---|
| Mean daily maximum °C (°F) | 6.9 (44.4) | 7.2 (45.0) | 9.7 (49.5) | 12.8 (55.0) | 18.1 (64.6) | 22.3 (72.1) | 25.7 (78.3) | 25.8 (78.4) | 21.7 (71.1) | 16.5 (61.7) | 11.0 (51.8) | 7.9 (46.2) | 15.5 (59.8) |
| Daily mean °C (°F) | 4.0 (39.2) | 4.1 (39.4) | 6.1 (43.0) | 8.8 (47.8) | 13.7 (56.7) | 17.5 (63.5) | 20.6 (69.1) | 20.7 (69.3) | 17.2 (63.0) | 12.7 (54.9) | 7.9 (46.2) | 5.1 (41.2) | 11.5 (52.8) |
| Mean daily minimum °C (°F) | 1.2 (34.2) | 1.1 (34.0) | 2.5 (36.5) | 4.8 (40.6) | 9.2 (48.6) | 12.7 (54.9) | 15.4 (59.7) | 15.7 (60.3) | 12.7 (54.9) | 8.9 (48.0) | 4.7 (40.5) | 2.3 (36.1) | 7.6 (45.7) |
| Average rainfall mm (inches) | 39.5 (1.56) | 37.4 (1.47) | 37.9 (1.49) | 38.8 (1.53) | 27.2 (1.07) | 18.1 (0.71) | 17.5 (0.69) | 19.2 (0.76) | 39.8 (1.57) | 50.4 (1.98) | 60.1 (2.37) | 45.8 (1.80) | 431.7 (17) |
| Average snowfall cm (inches) | 4.3 (1.7) | 5.4 (2.1) | 1.9 (0.7) | 0.5 (0.2) | 0 (0) | 0 (0) | 0 (0) | 0 (0) | 0 (0) | 0.03 (0.01) | 1.0 (0.4) | 3.8 (1.5) | 16.93 (6.61) |
| Average rainy days | 6.1 | 5.4 | 6.2 | 6.9 | 5.5 | 3.7 | 3.2 | 3.6 | 5.7 | 6.8 | 8.2 | 7.1 | 68.4 |
| Average snowy days | 0.7 | 1.0 | 0.6 | 0.2 | 0 | 0 | 0 | 0 | 0 | 0 | 0.3 | 0.7 | 3.5 |
| Average relative humidity (%) | 77 | 75 | 72 | 69 | 69 | 67 | 62 | 64 | 66 | 72 | 76 | 78 | 71 |
| Mean daily sunshine hours | 4.5 | 5.0 | 6.7 | 8.4 | 10.2 | 11.7 | 12.1 | 11.2 | 8.6 | 6.8 | 5.5 | 4.6 | 7.9 |
| Average ultraviolet index | 2 | 3 | 4 | 4 | 5 | 5 | 6 | 6 | 5 | 3 | 3 | 2 | 4 |
Source 1: Servizio Meteorologico (1971–2000 data)
Source 2: Servizio Meteorologico (1961–1990 data on humidity), Weather Spark, Potenza, Climate-Data, Potenza, Quando visitare, Potenza

=== Humid subtropical climate (Cfa) ===
A relatively "continental" and "four-season" version of the humid subtropical climate can be found in the Po and Adige valleys in the north, and sometimes in low inland central and southern Italy. It is marked by hot and wet summers, while winters are moderately cold. The precipitation is higher, and there is no dry season. Average temperatures are around 1 °C to 3 °C in January and more than 22 °C in July and August. Main cities: Milan, Genoa, Venice, Verona, Turin, Trieste, Bologna.

Climate data for Milan (Linate Airport), elevation: 107 m (351 ft), normals 1971–2000, extremes 1946–present, sunshine 1991–2010
| Month | Jan | Feb | Mar | Apr | May | Jun | Jul | Aug | Sep | Oct | Nov | Dec | Year |
|---|---|---|---|---|---|---|---|---|---|---|---|---|---|
| Mean daily maximum °C (°F) | 5.9 (42.6) | 9.0 (48.2) | 14.3 (57.7) | 17.4 (63.3) | 22.3 (72.1) | 26.2 (79.2) | 29.2 (84.6) | 28.5 (83.3) | 24.4 (75.9) | 17.8 (64.0) | 10.7 (51.3) | 6.4 (43.5) | 17.7 (63.9) |
| Daily mean °C (°F) | 2.5 (36.5) | 4.7 (40.5) | 9.0 (48.2) | 12.2 (54.0) | 17.0 (62.6) | 20.8 (69.4) | 23.6 (74.5) | 23.0 (73.4) | 19.2 (66.6) | 13.4 (56.1) | 7.2 (45.0) | 3.3 (37.9) | 13.0 (55.4) |
| Mean daily minimum °C (°F) | −0.9 (30.4) | 0.3 (32.5) | 3.8 (38.8) | 7.0 (44.6) | 11.6 (52.9) | 15.4 (59.7) | 18.0 (64.4) | 17.6 (63.7) | 14.0 (57.2) | 9.0 (48.2) | 3.7 (38.7) | 0.1 (32.2) | 8.3 (46.9) |
| Average rainfall mm (inches) | 39.8 (1.57) | 43.0 (1.69) | 52.6 (2.07) | 78.0 (3.07) | 85.3 (3.36) | 72.2 (2.84) | 53.3 (2.10) | 62.3 (2.45) | 80.3 (3.16) | 93.6 (3.69) | 88.9 (3.50) | 49.4 (1.94) | 798.7 (31.44) |
| Average snowfall cm (inches) | 3.7 (1.5) | 1.1 (0.4) | 0.3 (0.1) | 0.05 (0.02) | 0 (0) | 0 (0) | 0 (0) | 0 (0) | 0 (0) | 0 (0) | 0.3 (0.1) | 2.7 (1.1) | 8.15 (3.22) |
| Average rainy days | 4.2 | 4.2 | 5.8 | 9.2 | 10.3 | 9.2 | 7.2 | 7.6 | 7.7 | 8.2 | 7.2 | 5.1 | 85.9 |
| Average snowy days | 0.6 | 0.3 | 0.1 | 0 | 0 | 0 | 0 | 0 | 0 | 0 | 0.1 | 0.6 | 1.7 |
| Average relative humidity (%) | 86 | 78 | 71 | 75 | 72 | 71 | 71 | 72 | 74 | 81 | 85 | 86 | 77 |
| Mean daily sunshine hours | 5.2 | 6.2 | 7.8 | 9.3 | 11.2 | 12.4 | 12.4 | 11.1 | 9.2 | 5.9 | 4.7 | 4.9 | 8.4 |
| Average ultraviolet index | 2 | 3 | 3 | 4 | 4 | 5 | 6 | 5 | 5 | 4 | 3 | 2 | 4 |
Source 1: Servizio Meteorologico, Aeronautica Militare
Source 2: Weather Spark, Milano-Linate, Climate-Data, Milano-Linate, Quando visitare, Milano

=== Oceanic climate (Cfb) ===
It can be found in altitude in the Apennines and in the alpine foothills. Summers are between 17 and 21 °C (62.6 and 69.8 °F) Main cities and towns: Aosta, Biella, Campobasso, L'Aquila, Cuneo, Sondrio, Amatrice, Belluno, Breno, Feltre.

Climate data for Stazione Meteo L'Aquila 42°22′N 13°21′E
| Month | Jan | Feb | Mar | Apr | May | Jun | Jul | Aug | Sep | Oct | Nov | Dec | Year |
|---|---|---|---|---|---|---|---|---|---|---|---|---|---|
| Mean daily maximum °C (°F) | 6.4 (43.5) | 8.5 (47.3) | 12.3 (54.1) | 16.3 (61.3) | 20.9 (69.6) | 25.3 (77.5) | 29.0 (84.2) | 29.1 (84.4) | 24.7 (76.5) | 18.4 (65.1) | 12.2 (54.0) | 7.4 (45.3) | 17.5 (63.6) |
| Daily mean °C (°F) | 2.3 (36.1) | 3.8 (38.8) | 7.0 (44.6) | 10.7 (51.3) | 14.9 (58.8) | 18.7 (65.7) | 21.6 (70.9) | 21.6 (70.9) | 18.1 (64.6) | 12.8 (55.0) | 7.8 (46.0) | 3.7 (38.7) | 11.9 (53.5) |
| Mean daily minimum °C (°F) | −1.8 (28.8) | −1.0 (30.2) | 1.7 (35.1) | 5.0 (41.0) | 8.8 (47.8) | 12.2 (54.0) | 14.2 (57.6) | 14.1 (57.4) | 11.4 (52.5) | 7.2 (45.0) | 3.3 (37.9) | −0.1 (31.8) | 6.3 (43.3) |
| Average rainfall mm (inches) | 66.1 (2.60) | 64.5 (2.54) | 51.2 (2.02) | 56.6 (2.23) | 51.0 (2.01) | 46.1 (1.81) | 34.7 (1.37) | 37.7 (1.48) | 52.8 (2.08) | 66.3 (2.61) | 91.3 (3.59) | 83.7 (3.30) | 702 (27.64) |
| Average snowfall cm (inches) | 27 (11) | 19.8 (7.8) | 7.2 (2.8) | 0 (0) | 0 (0) | 0 (0) | 0 (0) | 0 (0) | 0 (0) | 0 (0) | 0 (0) | 13.8 (5.4) | 67.8 (27) |
| Average rainy days | 8 | 8 | 8 | 9 | 8 | 6 | 5 | 5 | 6 | 8 | 10 | 10 | 91 |
| Average snowy days | 3 | 2.2 | 1 | 0 | 0 | 0 | 0 | 0 | 0 | 0 | 0 | 1.6 | 7.8 |
| Average relative humidity (%) | 82 | 80 | 78 | 75 | 74 | 67 | 61 | 60 | 71 | 77 | 83 | 84 | 74 |
| Mean daily sunshine hours | 4.3 | 4.8 | 5.8 | 7.3 | 8.7 | 10.8 | 11.5 | 10.8 | 7.8 | 5.8 | 4.4 | 4.2 | 7.2 |
| Average ultraviolet index | 1 | 2 | 3 | 3 | 4 | 5 | 5 | 5 | 4 | 3 | 2 | 2 | 3 |
Source: , Climate-Data, L'Aquila, Quando visitare, L'Aquila

=== Humid continental climate (Dfb) ===
This climate is found in the Alps, around 1,200 meters (3,937 ft) in the western side, or around 1,000 m (3,281 ft) in the eastern side. It is marked by low winter averages (between −7 and −3 °C or 19.4 and 26.6 °F) and mild summers, with temperatures averaging from 13 to 18 °C (55.4 to 64.4 °F). Snow is usual from early November until March or early April. Main towns: Brusson, Gressoney-Saint-Jean, Aprica, Vermiglio, Mazzin, Santo Stefano di Cadore, Asiago, Claut, Resia.

Climate data for Asiago, Italy
| Month | Jan | Feb | Mar | Apr | May | Jun | Jul | Aug | Sep | Oct | Nov | Dec | Year |
|---|---|---|---|---|---|---|---|---|---|---|---|---|---|
| Mean daily maximum °C (°F) | 2.0 (35.6) | 3.0 (37.4) | 7.0 (44.6) | 10.0 (50.0) | 15.0 (59.0) | 19.0 (66.2) | 21.0 (69.8) | 21.0 (69.8) | 17.0 (62.6) | 12.0 (53.6) | 6.0 (42.8) | 3.0 (37.4) | 11.3 (52.4) |
| Daily mean °C (°F) | −1.0 (30.2) | 0.0 (32.0) | 3.0 (37.4) | 6.0 (42.8) | 11.0 (51.8) | 15.0 (59.0) | 18.0 (64.4) | 17.0 (62.6) | 13.0 (55.4) | 9.0 (48.2) | 3.0 (37.4) | 0.0 (32.0) | 7.8 (46.1) |
| Mean daily minimum °C (°F) | −4.0 (24.8) | −3.0 (26.6) | 0.0 (32.0) | 3.0 (37.4) | 7.0 (44.6) | 11.0 (51.8) | 14.0 (57.2) | 13.0 (55.4) | 10.0 (50.0) | 6.0 (42.8) | 1.0 (33.8) | −3.0 (26.6) | 4.6 (40.3) |
| Average rainfall mm (inches) | 22.3 (0.88) | 26.5 (1.04) | 37.6 (1.48) | 59.5 (2.34) | 75.9 (2.99) | 79.6 (3.13) | 67.5 (2.66) | 68.1 (2.68) | 79.4 (3.13) | 85.0 (3.35) | 71.8 (2.83) | 37.7 (1.48) | 710.9 (27.99) |
| Average snowfall cm (inches) | 10.79 (4.25) | 8.87 (3.49) | 5.81 (2.29) | 1.99 (0.78) | 0.04 (0.02) | 0 (0) | 0 (0) | 0 (0) | 0 (0) | 0.35 (0.14) | 3.32 (1.31) | 7.80 (3.07) | 38.97 (15.35) |
| Average rainy days | 2.2 | 2.4 | 4.2 | 8.0 | 10.2 | 10.6 | 9.9 | 9.5 | 7.8 | 7.6 | 6.0 | 3.5 | 81.9 |
| Average snowy days | 1.1 | 1.1 | 1.0 | 0.5 | 0 | 0 | 0 | 0 | 0 | 0.1 | 0.5 | 1.1 | 5.4 |
| Average relative humidity (%) | 74 | 73 | 74 | 76 | 77 | 76 | 76 | 77 | 78 | 82 | 81 | 75 | 77 |
| Mean daily sunshine hours | 6.2 | 6.4 | 7.2 | 7.5 | 8.9 | 10.6 | 10.9 | 9.8 | 7.4 | 5.5 | 5.1 | 5.8 | 7.6 |
| Average ultraviolet index | 2 | 2 | 3 | 3 | 4 | 5 | 5 | 4 | 4 | 3 | 2 | 2 | 3 |
Source: Weather Spark, Asiago, Climate-Data, Asiago, Quando visitare, Asiago

=== Warm-summer mediterranean continental climate (Dsb) ===
It is found at lower altitudes on the slopes of Mount Etna, Sicily, for example in Linguaglossa.

Climate data for Linguaglossa
| Month | Jan | Feb | Mar | Apr | May | Jun | Jul | Aug | Sep | Oct | Nov | Dec | Year |
|---|---|---|---|---|---|---|---|---|---|---|---|---|---|
| Mean daily maximum °C (°F) | 0.2 (32.4) | 1.7 (35.1) | 2.9 (37.2) | 7.4 (45.3) | 11.1 (52.0) | 15.2 (59.4) | 16.9 (62.4) | 16.6 (61.9) | 11.8 (53.2) | 8.9 (48.0) | 4.6 (40.3) | 3.1 (37.6) | 8.4 (47.1) |
| Daily mean °C (°F) | −0.2 (31.6) | 1.2 (34.2) | 2.3 (36.1) | 6.9 (44.4) | 10.5 (50.9) | 14.6 (58.3) | 16.3 (61.3) | 16 (61) | 11.4 (52.5) | 8.5 (47.3) | 4.2 (39.6) | 2.7 (36.9) | 7.9 (46.2) |
| Mean daily minimum °C (°F) | −0.6 (30.9) | 0.8 (33.4) | 1.7 (35.1) | 6.4 (43.5) | 9.9 (49.8) | 14.1 (57.4) | 15.8 (60.4) | 15.4 (59.7) | 10.9 (51.6) | 8.1 (46.6) | 3.9 (39.0) | 2.2 (36.0) | 7.4 (45.3) |
| Average rainfall mm (inches) | 136 (5.4) | 105 (4.1) | 91 (3.6) | 74 (2.9) | 39 (1.5) | 26 (1.0) | 13 (0.5) | 24 (0.9) | 111 (4.4) | 153 (6.0) | 142 (5.6) | 125 (4.9) | 1,039 (40.8) |
| Average snowfall cm (inches) | 21 (8.3) | 18 (7.1) | 19 (7.5) | 1 (0.4) | 0 (0) | 0 (0) | 0 (0) | 0 (0) | 0 (0) | 0 (0) | 4 (1.6) | 5 (2.0) | 68 (26.9) |
| Average rainy days | 10 | 9 | 8 | 8 | 5 | 3 | 2 | 3 | 9 | 10 | 11 | 10 | 88 |
| Average snowy days | 2.6 | 2.2 | 2.2 | 0.1 | 0 | 0 | 0 | 0 | 0 | 0.2 | 1 | 1.5 | 9.8 |
| Average relative humidity (%) | 82 | 80 | 76 | 74 | 69 | 62 | 58 | 60 | 73 | 79 | 82 | 82 | 73 |
| Mean daily sunshine hours | 6.6 | 7.2 | 8.5 | 9.8 | 11.5 | 12.6 | 12.6 | 11.8 | 9.5 | 7.9 | 6.7 | 6.4 | 9.3 |
| Average ultraviolet index | 4 | 3 | 4 | 4 | 5 | 6 | 7 | 6 | 6 | 5 | 4 | 3 | 5 |
Source: Snow-Forecast, Linguaglossa, Climate-Data, Linguaglossa, Quando visitare, Linguaglossa

=== Dry-summer subarctic climate (Dsc) ===
It is found at higher altitudes on the slopes of Mount Etna, Sicily, for example in Nicolosi.

Climate data for Nicolosi
| Month | Jan | Feb | Mar | Apr | May | Jun | Jul | Aug | Sep | Oct | Nov | Dec | Year |
|---|---|---|---|---|---|---|---|---|---|---|---|---|---|
| Mean daily maximum °C (°F) | −0.7 (30.7) | −1.2 (29.8) | 0.2 (32.4) | 2.9 (37.2) | 6.3 (43.3) | 9.0 (48.2) | 13.8 (56.8) | 15.2 (59.4) | 12.4 (54.3) | 8.4 (47.1) | 5.5 (41.9) | 0.9 (33.6) | 6.1 (42.9) |
| Daily mean °C (°F) | −1.2 (29.8) | −1.8 (28.8) | −0.3 (31.5) | 2.3 (36.1) | 5.6 (42.1) | 8.4 (47.1) | 13.1 (55.6) | 14.4 (57.9) | 11.7 (53.1) | 7.9 (46.2) | 5.1 (41.2) | 0.5 (32.9) | 5.5 (41.9) |
| Mean daily minimum °C (°F) | −1.8 (28.8) | −2.3 (27.9) | −0.8 (30.6) | 1.6 (34.9) | 4.9 (40.8) | 7.7 (45.9) | 12.5 (54.5) | 13.7 (56.7) | 11.1 (52.0) | 7.4 (45.3) | 4.8 (40.6) | 0 (32) | 4.9 (40.8) |
| Average rainfall mm (inches) | 83 (3.3) | 63 (2.5) | 55 (2.2) | 48 (1.9) | 30 (1.2) | 21 (0.8) | 8 (0.3) | 17 (0.7) | 56 (2.2) | 67 (2.6) | 70 (2.8) | 68 (2.7) | 586 (23.2) |
| Average snowfall cm (inches) | 63 (25) | 84 (33) | 75 (30) | 15 (5.9) | 2 (0.8) | 0 (0) | 0 (0) | 0 (0) | 0 (0) | 3 (1.2) | 12 (4.7) | 40 (16) | 294 (116.6) |
| Average rainy days | 6 | 5 | 5 | 5 | 4 | 2 | 1 | 2 | 5 | 6 | 6 | 6 | 53 |
| Average snowy days | 10 | 11.9 | 10.9 | 4.6 | 0.7 | 0 | 0 | 0 | 0 | 1.1 | 3.9 | 7.4 | 50.5 |
| Average relative humidity (%) | 80 | 77 | 73 | 69 | 63 | 56 | 51 | 54 | 68 | 76 | 80 | 81 | 69 |
| Mean daily sunshine hours | 6.5 | 7.3 | 8.7 | 10.0 | 11.7 | 12.7 | 12.7 | 11.9 | 9.7 | 8.0 | 6.8 | 6.4 | 9.4 |
| Average ultraviolet index | 3 | 3 | 4 | 5 | 5 | 7 | 7 | 7 | 5 | 4 | 4 | 3 | 5 |
Source: Snow-Forecast, Nicolosi, Climate-Data, Nicolosi, Quando visitare, Nicolosi

=== Subarctic climate (Dfc) ===
In the alpine valley around 1,600–1,800 meters (5,249–5,906 ft). The winters are very cold, averages between −12 and −5 °C (10.4 and 23.0 °F), and summers are cool, usually around 12 °C (53.6 °F). Main towns and villages in this area: Livigno, Chamois, Misurina, Predoi, Rhêmes-Notre-Dame.

Climate data for Livigno (2009–2017)
| Month | Jan | Feb | Mar | Apr | May | Jun | Jul | Aug | Sep | Oct | Nov | Dec | Year |
|---|---|---|---|---|---|---|---|---|---|---|---|---|---|
| Mean daily maximum °C (°F) | −5.9 (21.4) | −5.0 (23.0) | −1.8 (28.8) | 1.6 (34.9) | 6.6 (43.9) | 12.0 (53.6) | 14.8 (58.6) | 14.8 (58.6) | 9.8 (49.6) | 4.4 (39.9) | −1.0 (30.2) | −4.9 (23.2) | 3.8 (38.8) |
| Daily mean °C (°F) | −10.0 (14.0) | −9.6 (14.7) | −5.7 (21.7) | −1.3 (29.7) | 3.7 (38.7) | 8.9 (48.0) | 11.3 (52.3) | 11.1 (52.0) | 6.2 (43.2) | 0.8 (33.4) | −4.3 (24.3) | −8.5 (16.7) | 0.2 (32.4) |
| Mean daily minimum °C (°F) | −14.1 (6.6) | −14.1 (6.6) | −9.6 (14.7) | −4.1 (24.6) | 0.9 (33.6) | 5.9 (42.6) | 7.8 (46.0) | 7.3 (45.1) | 2.6 (36.7) | −2.8 (27.0) | −7.6 (18.3) | −12.2 (10.0) | −3.3 (26.1) |
| Average rainfall mm (inches) | 106.7 (4.20) | 122.7 (4.83) | 133.9 (5.27) | 205.1 (8.07) | 247.8 (9.76) | 270.6 (10.65) | 274.5 (10.81) | 128.9 (5.07) | 178.4 (7.02) | 125.0 (4.92) | 171.1 (6.74) | 121.0 (4.76) | 2,085.7 (82.11) |
| Average snowfall cm (inches) | 85.8 (33.8) | 99.6 (39.2) | 106.7 (42.0) | 140.6 (55.4) | 102.0 (40.2) | 47.6 (18.7) | 9.3 (3.7) | 10.7 (4.2) | 49.2 (19.4) | 68.4 (26.9) | 128.0 (50.4) | 95.5 (37.6) | 943.6 (371.5) |
| Average rainy days | 4.1 | 4.1 | 6.0 | 10.2 | 19.0 | 24.9 | 26.8 | 25.7 | 17.0 | 10.7 | 4.6 | 3.8 | 156.8 |
| Average snowy days | 18.4 | 20.3 | 22.0 | 22.4 | 17.4 | 8.1 | 2.3 | 2.7 | 8.0 | 12.8 | 16.2 | 17.1 | 167.9 |
| Average relative humidity (%) | 94.8 | 94.6 | 97.0 | 96.0 | 90.0 | 83.8 | 82.0 | 82.6 | 85.1 | 87.2 | 91.1 | 90.7 | 89.6 |
| Mean daily sunshine hours | 4.3 | 4.9 | 6.0 | 6.6 | 7.0 | 8.7 | 8.9 | 7.7 | 5.8 | 4.9 | 4.0 | 3.9 | 6.1 |
| Average ultraviolet index | 1 | 1 | 1 | 1 | 2 | 3 | 3 | 2 | 2 | 1 | 1 | 2 | 2 |
Source: World Weather Online, Climate-Data, Livigno, Quando visitare, Livigno

=== Tundra climate (ET) ===
Above the tree line in the Alps. All the months with average below 10 °C (50 °F).

Villages with this climate: Cervinia, Trepalle.

Climate data for Trepalle
| Month | Jan | Feb | Mar | Apr | May | Jun | Jul | Aug | Sep | Oct | Nov | Dec | Year |
|---|---|---|---|---|---|---|---|---|---|---|---|---|---|
| Mean daily maximum °C (°F) | −8.4 (16.9) | −6.6 (20.1) | −2.5 (27.5) | 1.3 (34.3) | 5.5 (41.9) | 11.1 (52.0) | 13.5 (56.3) | 13.4 (56.1) | 9.4 (48.9) | 5.0 (41.0) | −2.1 (28.2) | −7.2 (19.0) | 2.7 (36.9) |
| Daily mean °C (°F) | −12.2 (10.0) | −10.9 (12.4) | −6.7 (19.9) | −2.4 (27.7) | 1.9 (35.4) | 6.9 (44.4) | 9.1 (48.4) | 8.9 (48.0) | 5.0 (41.0) | 0.8 (33.4) | −5.7 (21.7) | −10.8 (12.6) | −1.3 (29.6) |
| Mean daily minimum °C (°F) | −16.4 (2.5) | −15.4 (4.3) | −11.2 (11.8) | −6.6 (20.1) | −2.3 (27.9) | 2.0 (35.6) | 4.0 (39.2) | 4.1 (39.4) | 0.4 (32.7) | −3.4 (25.9) | −9.6 (14.7) | −15 (5) | −5.8 (21.6) |
| Average precipitation mm (inches) | 59 (2.3) | 54 (2.1) | 63 (2.5) | 86 (3.4) | 104 (4.1) | 114 (4.5) | 107 (4.2) | 103 (4.1) | 85 (3.3) | 100 (3.9) | 120 (4.7) | 71 (2.8) | 1,066 (41.9) |
| Average precipitation days | 8 | 7 | 8 | 10 | 13 | 13 | 13 | 12 | 9 | 9 | 10 | 9 | 121 |
| Average relative humidity (%) | 70 | 71 | 71 | 74 | 79 | 73 | 71 | 73 | 75 | 78 | 78 | 71 | 74 |
| Mean monthly sunshine hours | 129 | 147 | 180 | 198 | 210 | 261 | 267 | 231 | 174 | 147 | 120 | 117 | 2,181 |
Source: climate-data.org

== Extremes ==
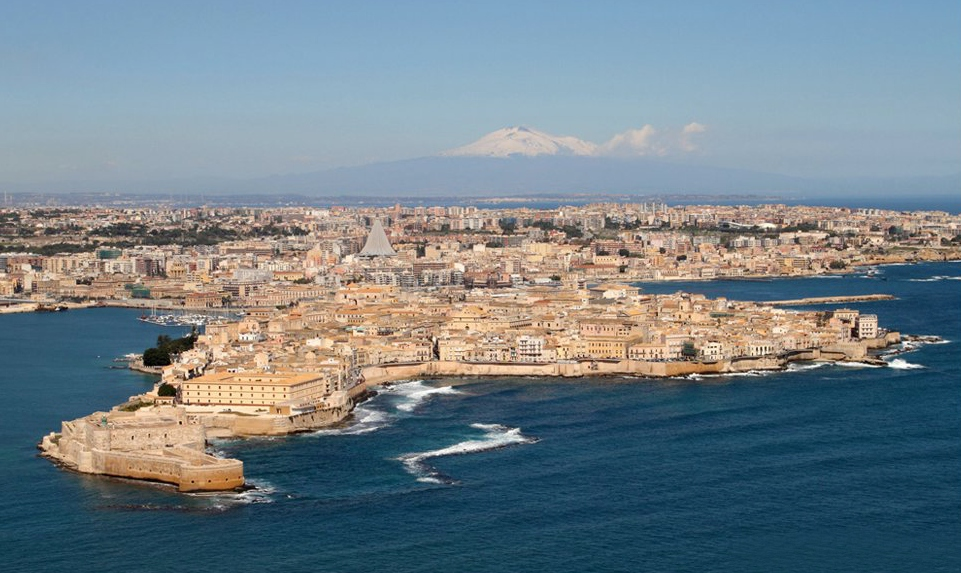
Syracuse, Sicily, where the highest temperature ever in Europe was recorded, 48.8 °C (119.8 °F)

The record low temperature in Italy is −49.6 °C (−57.3 °F), recorded on 10 February 2013 in the Alps on the Pale di San Martino plateau, in Trentino-Alto Adige, while near sea level is −24.8 °C (−12.6 °F), recorded on 12 January 1985 at San Pietro Capofiume, frazione of Molinella, in Emilia-Romagna. The lowest temperature record for an inhabited place is −37.4 °C (−35.3 °F), recorded on 15 February 2012 in Rocca di Mezzo, Abruzzo, in the Apennines.

The maximum snow depth was recorded in March 1951 in the Alps at the meteorological station of Lake D'Avino, in Piedmont, with a value of 1,125 cm (443 in). The maximum snowfall in 24 hours is 181 cm (71 in), recorded in the Apennines in the village of Roccacaramanico, frazione of Sant'Eufemia a Maiella (Majella massif), Abruzzo, on 15 January 1951.

The village of Musi, frazione of the municipality of Lusevera, Friuli-Venezia Giulia, with an annual average precipitation of 3,313 mm (130.4 in) (with a record of 5,406 mm (212.8 in) in 2014) is the wettest place in Italy. The maximum rainfall in 24 hours was recorded in Bolzaneto, a quarter of Genoa, Liguria, on 10 September 1970 with a value of 948 mm (37.3 in). However, there are many daily rainfall records around Italy exceeding 500 mm (20 in).

In the south, Sicily has experienced highs of 46 °C (114.8 °F) in some hot summers. On 25 June 2007 47.0 °C (116.6 °F) were recorded in Foggia, Apulia, and on 10 August 1999, 48.5 °C (119.3 °F) were recorded in Catenanuova in Sicily. The latter is not official, and generally considered dubious. On 11 August 2021, an agricultural monitoring station near Syracuse, Sicily recorded 48.8 °C (119.8 °F) which constitutes the official record of the highest temperature in Europe according to the World Meteorological Organization.

== Climate change ==
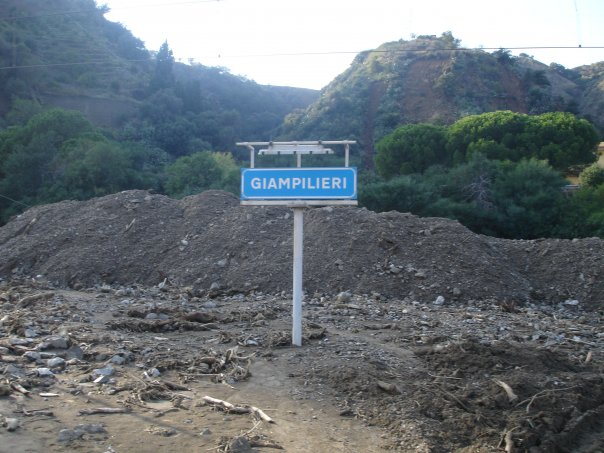
2009 Messina floods and mudslides

Italy, like other parts of the globe, has been subject in the past to climate changes on a planetary scale (for example, glaciations and interglacial periods, and the Little Ice Age). Contemporary climate change (global warming) has also had numerous effects on Italy. In particular, compared to the 1960s and 1970s, from the mid-1980s onwards, there was a recorded increase in the average temperature.

Italy is particularly at risk as it is in a transition area between North Africa and Continental Europe. Experts have highlighted the risk of desertification in the southern regions. Partial confirmation of many concerns was obtained starting from the 2010s, with an acceleration of the water cycle, an increase in alluvial phenomena, and the tropicalization of the Mediterranean Sea.

== See also ==
- Climate of Ancient Rome
- Climate change in Italy
- Geography of Italy
