= Outline of meteorology =

Overview of and topical guide to meteorology

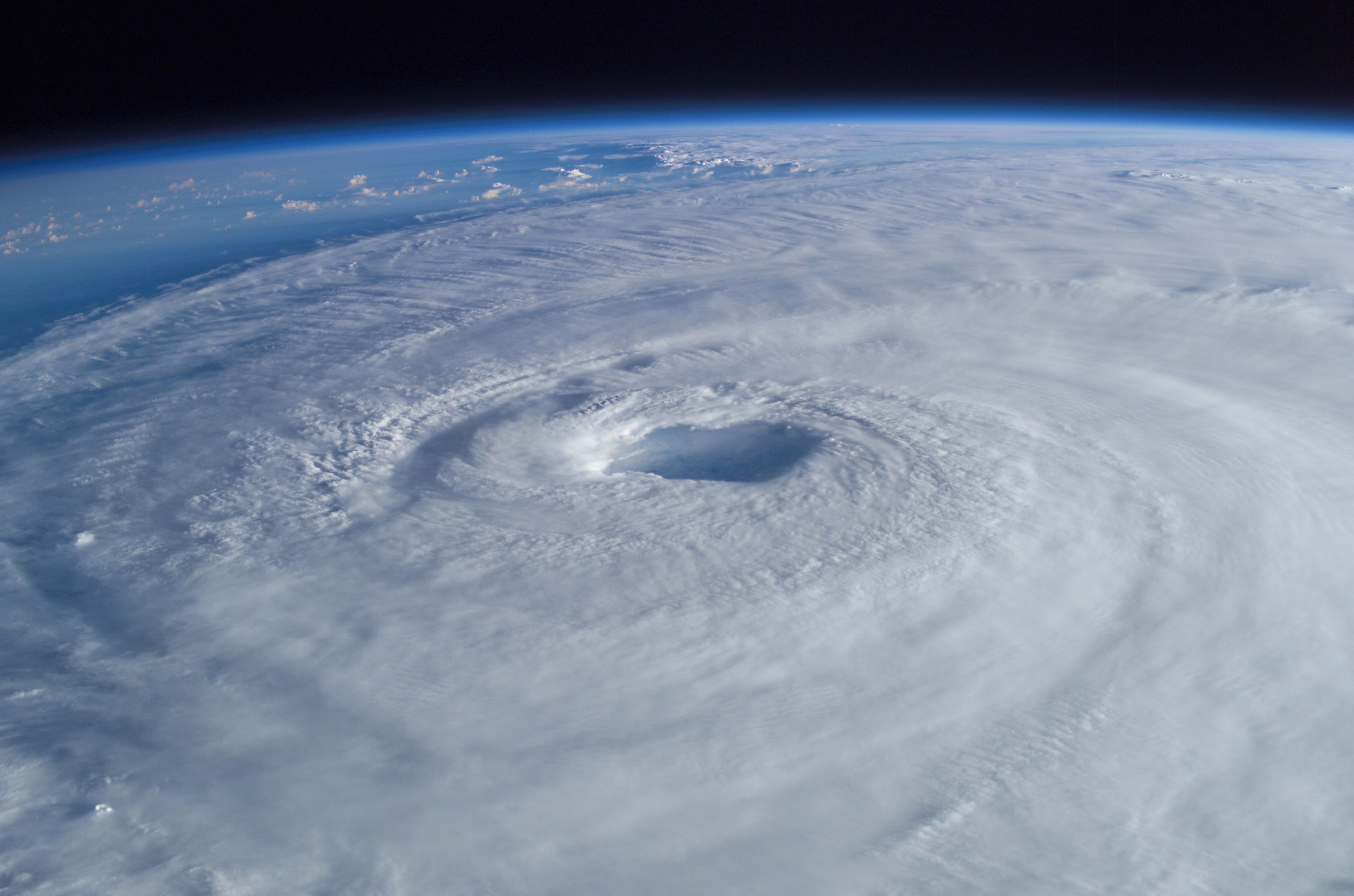
Eye of Hurricane Isabel from the International Space Station, September 15, 2003.

The following outline is provided as an overview of and topical guide to the field of Meteorology.

Meteorology
The interdisciplinary, scientific study of the Earth's atmosphere with the primary focus being to understand, explain, and forecast weather events. Meteorology, is applied to and employed by a wide variety of diverse fields, including the military, energy production, transport, agriculture, and construction.

== Essence of meteorology ==
Meteorology

- Climate – the average and variations of weather in a region over long periods of time.
- Meteorology – the interdisciplinary scientific study of the atmosphere that focuses on weather processes and forecasting (in contrast with climatology).
- Weather – the set of all the phenomena in a given atmosphere at a given time.

== Branches of meteorology ==
- Microscale meteorology – the study of atmospheric phenomena about 1 km or less, smaller than mesoscale, including small and generally fleeting cloud "puffs" and other small cloud features
- Mesoscale meteorology – the study of weather systems about 5 kilometers to several hundred kilometers, smaller than synoptic scale systems but larger than microscale and storm-scale cumulus systems, such as sea breezes, squall lines, and mesoscale convective complexes
- Synoptic scale meteorology – is a horizontal length scale of the order of 1000 kilometres (about 620 miles) or more

== Methods in meteorology ==
- Surface weather analysis – a special type of weather map that provides a view of weather elements over a geographical area at a specified time based on information from ground-based weather stations

=== Weather forecasting ===
Weather forecasting – the application of science and technology to predict the state of the atmosphere for a future time and a given location

==== Data collection ====
- Pilot Reports

==== Weather maps ====
Weather map

- Surface weather analysis

==== Forecasts and reporting of ====
- Atmospheric pressure
- Dew point
- High-pressure area
- Ice
  - Black ice
  - Frost
- Low-pressure area
- Precipitation
- Temperature
- Weather front
- Wind chill
- Wind direction
- Wind speed

== Instruments and equipment of meteorology ==
- Anemometer – a device for measuring wind speed; used in weather stations
- Barograph – an aneroid barometer that records the barometric pressure over time and produces a paper or foil chart called a barogram
- Barometer – an instrument used to measure atmospheric pressure using either water, air, or mercury; useful for forecasting short term changes in the weather

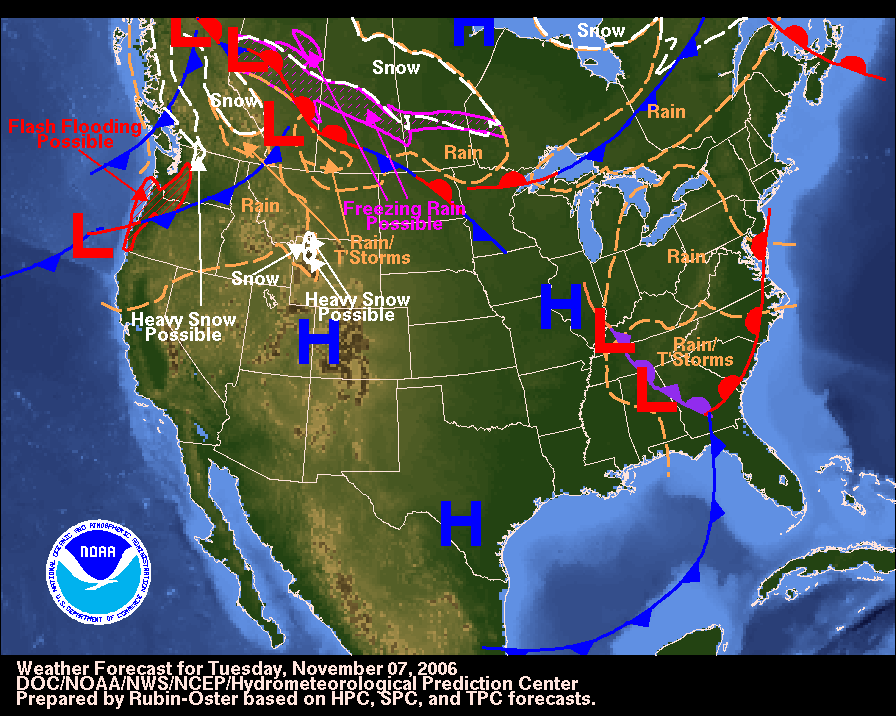
NOAA continental US weather forecast map for November 7, 2006

- Ceiling balloon – a balloon, with a known ascent rate, used to measure the height of the base of clouds during daylight
- Ceiling projector – a device that is used, in conjunction with an alidade, to measure the height of the base of clouds
- Ceilometer – a device that uses a laser or other light source to measure the height of the base of clouds.
- Dark adaptor goggles – clear, red-tinted plastic goggles used either for adapting the eyes to dark prior to night observation or to help identify clouds during bright sunshine or glare from snow
- Disdrometer – an instrument used to measure the drop size, distribution, and velocity of falling hydrometeors
- Field mill – an instrument used to measure the strength of electric fields in the atmosphere near thunderstorm clouds
- Hygrometer – an instrument used to measure humidity
- Ice Accretion Indicator – an L-shaped piece of aluminum 15 inches (38 cm) long by 2 inches (5 cm) wide used to indicate the formation of ice, frost, or the presence of freezing rain or freezing drizzle
- Lidar (LIght raDAR) – an optical remote sensing technology used in atmospheric physics (among other fields) that measures the properties of scattered light to find information about a distant target
- Lightning detector – a device, either ground-based, mobile, or space-based, that detects lightning produced by thunderstorms
- Nephelometer – an instrument used to measure suspended particulates in a liquid or gas colloid. Gas-phase nephelometers are used to provide information on atmospheric visibility and albedo
- Nephoscope – an instrument for measuring the altitude, direction, and velocity of clouds
- Pyranometer – A type of actinometer found in many meteorological stations used to measure broadband solar irradiance
- Radar – see Weather radar
- Radiosonde – an instrument used in weather balloons that measures various atmospheric parameters and transmits them to a fixed receiver
- Rain gauge – an instrument that gathers and measures the amount of liquid precipitation over a set period of time
- Snow gauge – an instrument that gathers and measures the amount of solid precipitation over a set period of time
- SODAR (SOnic Detection And Ranging) – an instrument that measures the scattering of sound waves by atmospheric turbulence
- Solarimeter – a pyranometer, an instrument used to measure combined direct and diffuse solar radiation
- Sounding rocket – an instrument-carrying sub-orbital rocket designed to take measurements and perform scientific experiments
- Stevenson screen – part of a standard weather station, it shields instruments from precipitation and direct heat radiation while still allowing air to circulate freely
- Sunshine recorders – devices used to indicate the amount of sunshine at a given location
- Thermograph – a chart recorder that measures and records both temperature and humidity
- Thermometer – a device that measures temperature or temperature gradient
- Weather balloon – a high-altitude balloon that carries instruments aloft and uses a radiosonde to send back information on atmospheric pressure, temperature, and humidity
- Weather radar – a type of radar used to locate precipitation, calculate its motion, estimate its type (rain, snow, hail, etc.) and forecast its future position and intensity
- Weather vane – a movable device attached to an elevated object such as a roof that shows the direction of the wind
- Windsock – a conical textile tube designed to indicate wind direction and relative wind speed
- Wind profiler – equipment that uses radar or SODAR to detect wind speed and direction at various elevations

== History of meteorology ==
- History of weather forecasting – prior to the invention of meteorological instruments, weather analysis and prediction relied on pattern recognition, which was not always reliable
- History of surface weather analysis – initially used to study storm behavior, now used to explain current weather and as an aid in short term weather forecasting

== Meteorological phenomena ==
- Atmospheric pressure – the pressure at any given point in the Earth's atmosphere
- Cloud – a visible mass of droplets or frozen crystals floating in the atmosphere above the surface of a planet
- Rain – precipitation in which separate drops of water fall to the Earth from clouds, a product of the condensation of atmospheric water vapor
- Snow – precipitation in the form of crystalline water ice, consisting of a multitude of snowflakes that fall from clouds

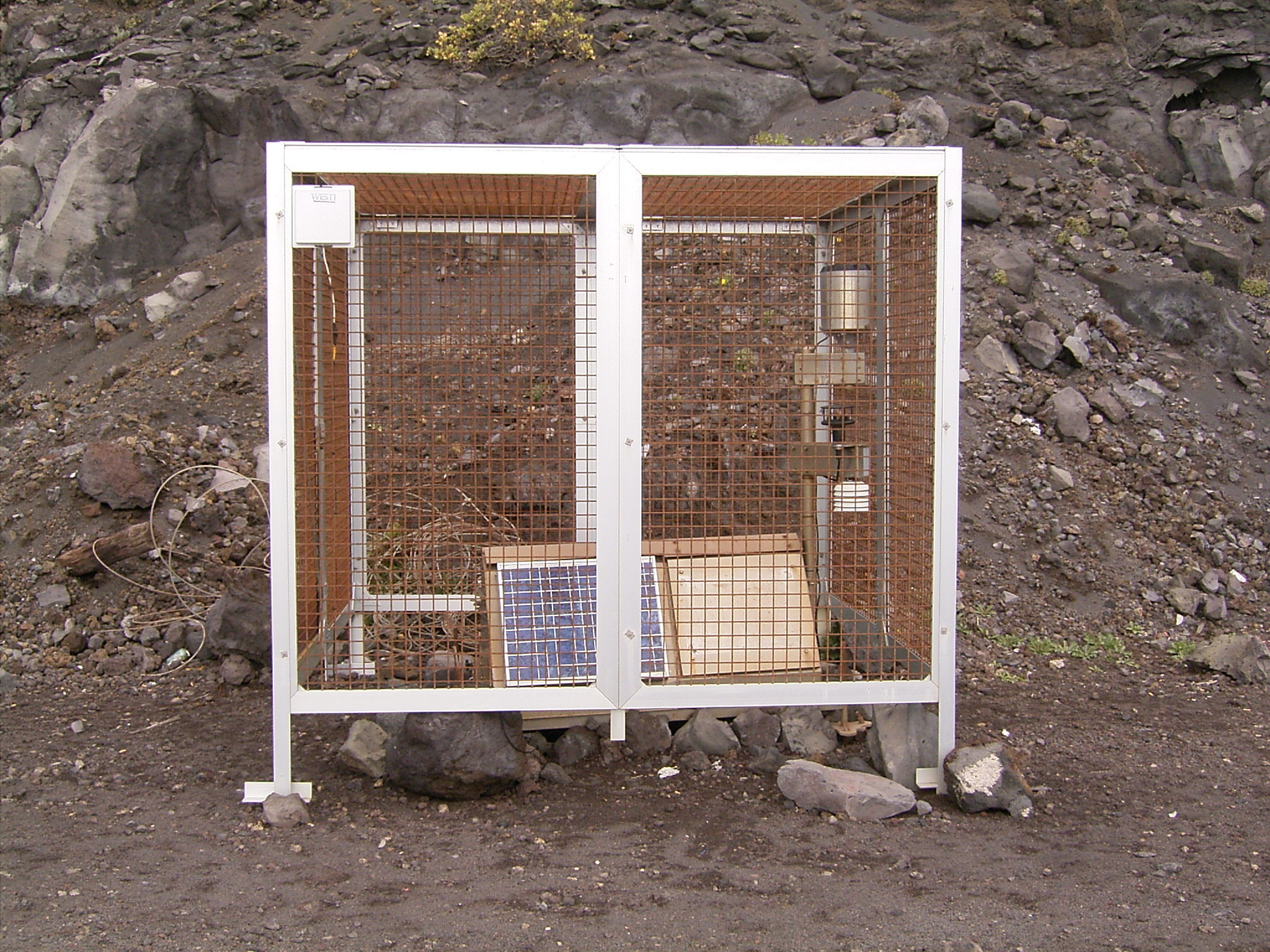
Weather station in Fuencaliente de La Palma, La Palma, Canary Islands, March 28, 2008

- Freezing rain – precipitation that falls from a cloud as snow, melts completely on its way down, then passes through a layer of below-freezing air becoming supercooled, at which point it will freeze upon impact with any object encountered
- Sleet – term used in the United States and Canada for precipitation consisting of small, translucent ice balls, usually smaller than hailstones
- Tropical cyclone – a storm system with a low-pressure center and numerous thunderstorms that produce strong winds and flooding rain
- Extratropical cyclone – a low-pressure weather system occurring in the middle latitudes of the Earth having neither tropical nor polar characteristics
- Weather front – a boundary separating two masses of air of different densities; the principal cause of meteorological phenomena
- Low pressure – a region where the atmospheric pressure is lower in relation to the surrounding area
- Storm – any disturbed state of the atmosphere and strongly implying severe weather
- Flooding – an overflow of an expanse of water that submerges the land; a deluge
- Nor'easter – a macro-scale storm along the East Coast of the United States, named for the winds that come from the northeast
- Wind – the flow of air or other gases that compose an atmosphere; caused by rising heated air and cooler air rushing in to occupy the vacated space.
- Temperature – a physical property that describes our common notions of hot and cold
- Invest (meteorology) – An area with the potential for tropical cyclone development

=== Weather-related disasters ===
- Weather disasters
- Extreme weather
- List of floods
- List of natural disasters by death toll
- List of severe weather phenomena

== Leaders in meteorology ==
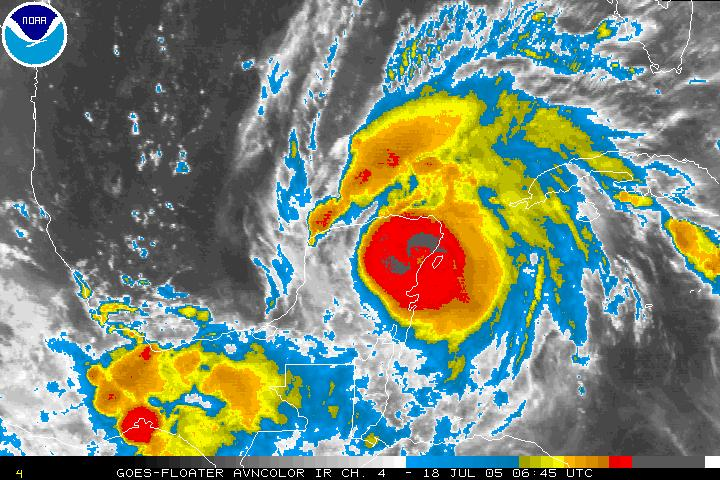
Hurricane Emily bears down on Mexico's Yucatan Peninsula on July 17, 2005

- William M. Gray (October 9, 1929 – April 16, 2016) – has been involved in forecasting hurricanes since 1984
- Francis Galton (February 16, 1822 - January 17, 1911) – was a polymath, and devised the first weather map, proposed a theory of anticyclones, and was the first to establish a complete record of short-term climatic phenomena on a European scale
- Herbert Saffir (March 29, 1917 – November 21, 2007) – was the developer of the Saffir-Simpson Hurricane Scale for measuring the intensity of hurricanes
- Bob Simpson (November 19, 1912 – December 18, 2014) – was a meteorologist, hurricane specialist, first director of the National Hurricane Research Project, former director of the National Hurricane Center, and co-developer of the Saffir-Simpson Hurricane Scale.

== See also ==
- Meteorology
- Glossary of meteorology
- Index of meteorology articles
- Standard day
- Jet stream
- Heat index
- Equivalent potential temperature (Theta-e)
- Primitive equations

Climate:

- El Niño
- Monsoon
- Flood
- Drought
- Global warming
- Effect of sun angle on climate

Other phenomena:

- Deposition
- Dust devil
- Fog
- Tide
- Air mass
- Evaporation
- Sublimation
- Crepuscular rays
- Anticrepuscular rays
