= Synoptic climatology =

Subfield of climatology

Synoptic climatology is a subfield of climatology under the larger umbrella of atmospheric science which attempts to relate local or regional climate to larger or global atmospheric circulation patterns. The word synoptic derived from the Ancient Greek word συνοπτικός (sunoptikós), meaning "seen together" or "view together" and thus objective of synoptic climatology is to relate local or regional climates to atmospheric circulation as an analytical approach. It is defined as "the study of climates from the viewpoint of their atmospheric circulation components and emphasizes the connection between circulation, weather phenomena, and climatic differentiation." It is closely related to the synoptic scale meteorology.
