= Climate change in Italy =

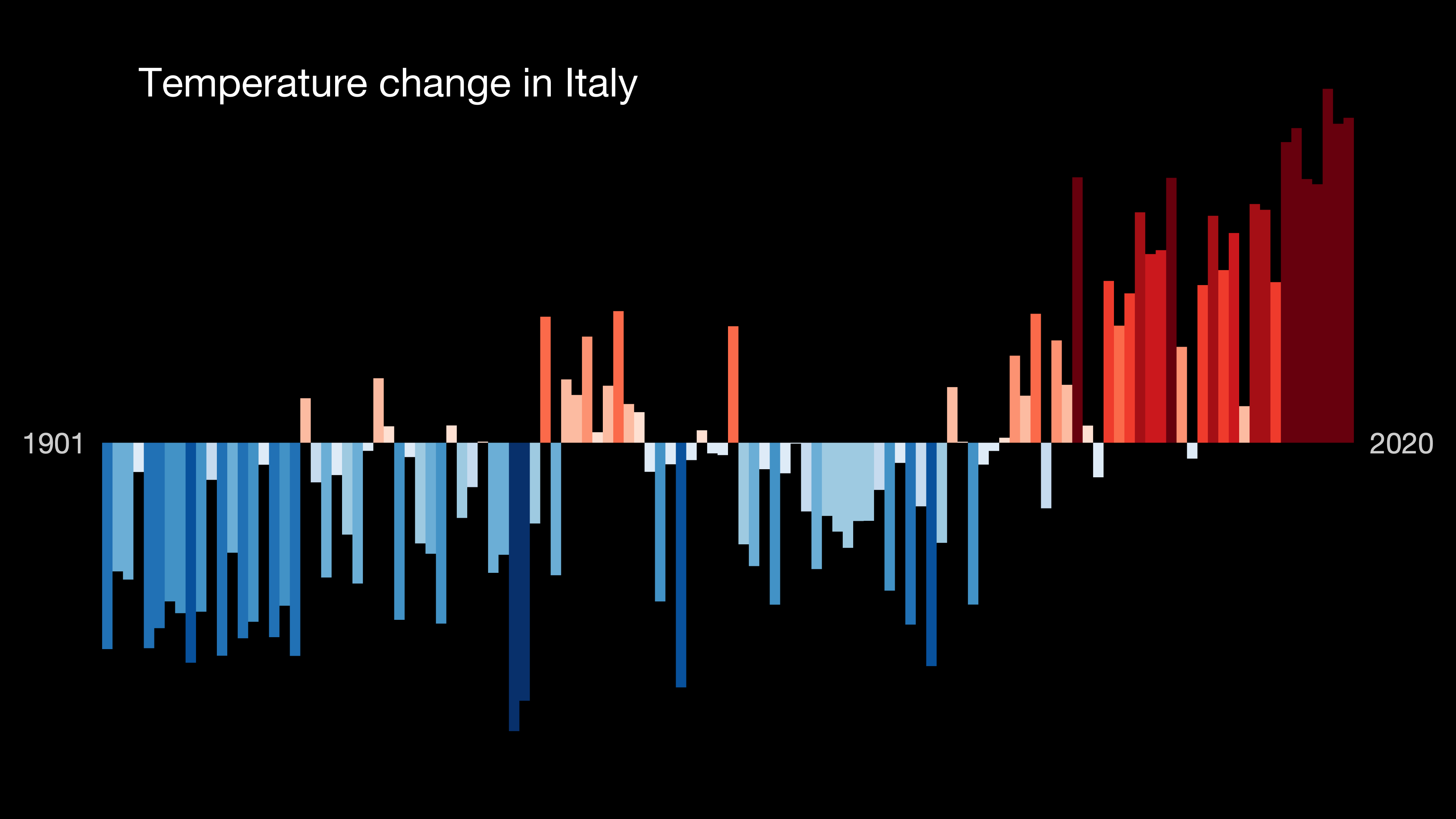
Temperature change over the last 100 years in Italy showing an increase in the average temperature the last two decades

It is getting increasingly hot all over the world, Italy being just one of many feeling the negative effects.

Italy is experiencing widespread impacts of climate change, with an increase in extreme events such as heatwaves, droughts and more frequent flooding; for example, Venice is facing increasing issues due to sea level rise. Italy faces many challenges adapting to climate change including the economic, social, and environmental impacts that climate change creates, and an increasingly problematic death toll from the health risks that come with climate change.

Italy was the first country to make education on climate change compulsory, and has included "protection of the environment, biodiversity and ecosystems" in the constitution in order to "protect future generations". Italy is part of the Paris Agreement, the EU Adaptation Strategy and a treaty with France for a reinforced bilateral cooperation which includes a common commitment to sustainable development, the defense of the climate and biodiversity, and the protection of the Mediterranean and the Alpine Arc.

Italy is trying to adapt its consumption into a more sustainable model by turning to renewable energy and gradually eliminating fossil fuels.

== Greenhouse gas emissions ==
Greenhouse gas emissions by sector in 2018: electricity and heat production and transport emit the most.

=== Energy consumption ===
Italy is the 3rd largest consumer of energy in the European Union after Germany and France. Italy's most used sources of energy are petroleum products such as petrol, and natural gas. Due to climate change, Italy has been increasing efforts to produce and consume more renewable or "green" energy to reduce their carbon emissions. Italy is highly dependent on imported energy; and is the second largest importer of natural gas in Europe which comes from Russia. Some electricity is also imported, including nuclear power from France.

=== Transportation ===
Transportation is the sector most responsible for greenhouse gas emissions in Italy. In 1990 Italy emitted about 100 million tonnes of CO_{2}, emitting steadily more annually over the following 15 years, to almost 130 million tonnes in 2005. Emission levels drop drastically in 2010 and 2015, settling between 100 and 106 million tonnes of CO_{2} until 2019. In 2022, Forza Italia unsuccessfully attempted to weaken EU rules on car emissions.

=== Fossil fuels ===
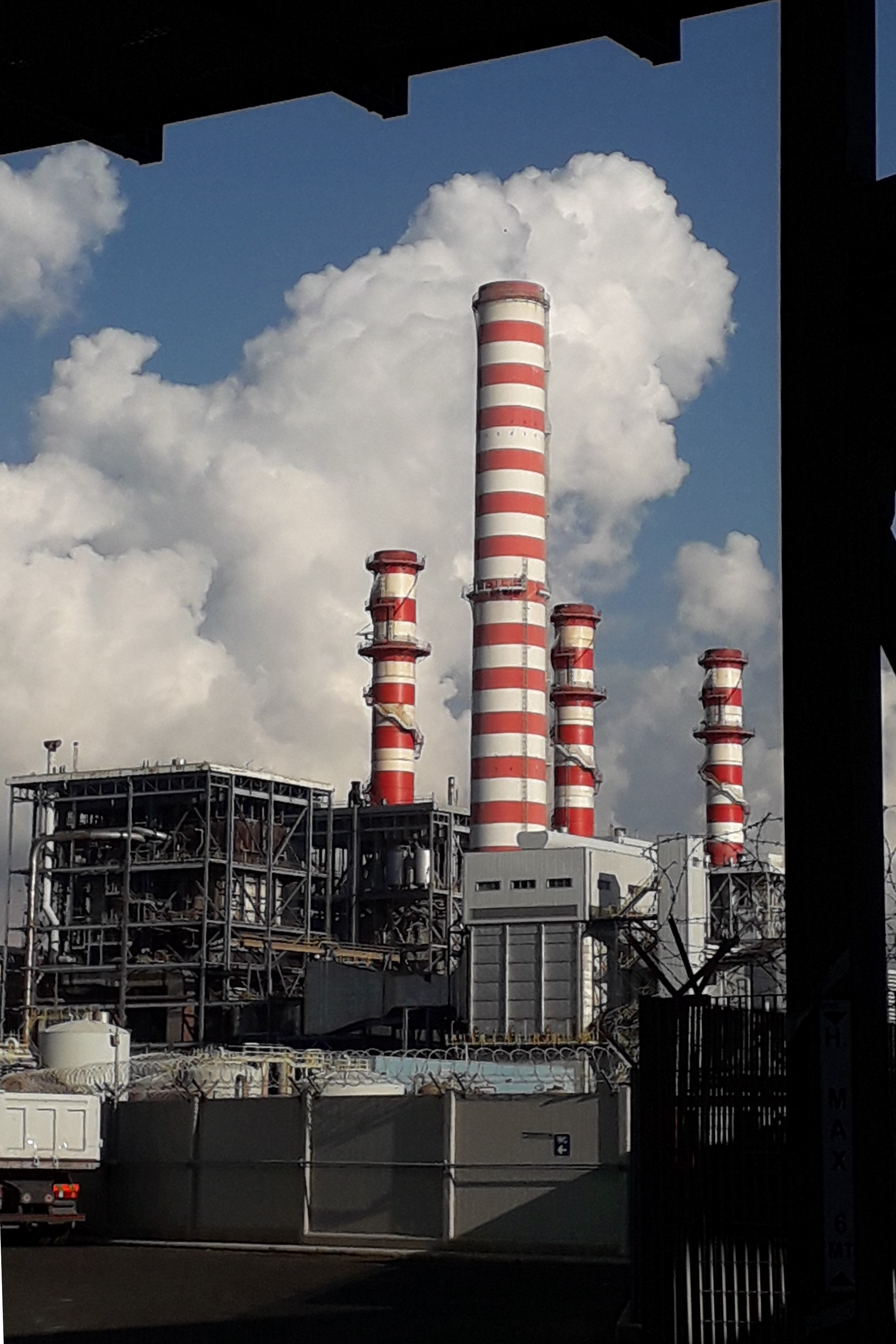
Thermoelectric plant in Civitavecchia, Lazio

Energy in Italy comes mostly from fossil fuels. Among the most used resources are petroleum (mostly used for the transport sector), natural gas (used for electric energy production and heating), coal and renewables. Italy has few energy resources, and most supplies are imported.

An important share of its electricity is imported, mainly from Switzerland and France. The share of primary energy dedicated to electricity production is above 35%, and has grown steadily since the 1970s.

Electricity is produced mainly from natural gas, which accounts for the source of more than half of the total final electric energy produced. Another important source is hydroelectric power, which was practically the only source of electricity until 1960. Wind and solar power grew rapidly between 2010 and 2013 thanks to high incentives. Italy is one of the world's largest producers of renewable energy.

Carbon dioxide emissions by fuel

=== Industrial emissions ===
Emissions in Italy has increased throughout the industrial age, however due to the demands of climate change and the effort to switch over to more renewable energy sources, Italy has managed to be on a downward curve for their emissions. From 1989 to about 2008, Italy was on the rise for emissions to about 600 million tonnes (Mt) of CO_{2}, but has since decreased to under 500 Mt to around 450 Mt of CO_{2} in 2019. Most of their air pollution when it comes to CO_{2} emissions has come from their energy supply for electricity and second to that is from manufacturing.

Development of CO_{2} emissions in Italy

Italy's CO_{2} emissions reached 5.13 tonnes per capita in 2019, 17% higher than the world average (4.39 t/inhab).

Evolution of energy-related CO_{2} emissions
	1971	1990	2018	var. 2018/1971	var. 2018/1990
Emissions (Mt CO_{2})	289.4	389.4	317.1	+9.6 %	-18.6 %
Emissions/capita (t CO_{2})	5.35	6.87	5.25	-1.9 %	-23.6 %
Source : International Energy Agency

The International Energy Agency also provides the emissions for 2019: 302.8 MtCO_{2}, down 4.5% compared to 2018h 1; per capita: 5.02 tCO_{2}.

Energy-related CO_{2} emissions in Italy experienced strong growth until 2005: 456.4 Mt, i.e. +58% in 34 years, then fell to 428.9 Mt in 2008, collapsed in 2009 due to the Great Recession: -10.5% and continued to decline thereafter.

Per capita, Italy emitted 14.5% less than the European Union average (6.14 t/cap) in 2018.

Breakdown by fuel of energy-related CO_{2} emissions
Combustible	1971; Mt CO_{2}	1990; Mt CO_{2}	2018; Mt CO_{2}	%	var. 2018/1990
Coal	32.6	56.6	34.3	11 %	-39.4 %
Oil	232.7	244.8	140.2	44 %	-42.7 %
Natural gas	24.1	87.1	137.6	43 %	+58 %
Source : International Energy Agency

Energy-related CO_{2} emissions by consumption sector*
	2018 emissions	sector share	Emissions/capita
Sector	Million tons CO_{2}	%	tons CO_{2}/hab.
Energy sector excluding elect.	18.1	6 %	0.30
Industry and building	71.3	22 %	1.18
Transport	103.6	33 %	1.72
of which road transport	94.9	30 %	1.57
Residential	67.0	21 %	1.11
Tertiary	47.7	15 %	0.79
Total	317.1	100 %	5.25
Source : International Energy Agency * after re-allocation of emissions from electricity and heat generation to consumption sectors.

=== Forests ===
Some forest has regrown on abandoned farmland. A new forestry strategy has been agreed and was published in 2022. Wildfires in Italy can be a problem.

== Impacts on the natural environment ==
=== Temperature and weather changes ===
Köppen climate classification map for Italy for 1980–2016

2071–2100 map under the most intense climate change scenario. Mid-range scenarios are currently considered more likely.

The climate of Italy is experiencing rising temperatures, melting glaciers, an increase in the number of extreme floods due to sea rise and high rainfall, and more frequent and prolonged periods of drought.

These climatic variations could be noticed in July 2021, when heavy rains were seen causing a lot of damage, while a month later the country experienced a record temperature, with a maximum temperature of 48.8 degrees, in Sicily putting 26 cities under red alert. These two phenomena reflect a changing climate in recent years.

In addition to the increase in these extreme events, the changing Italian climate has seen a decrease in precipitation, such as the winter of 2022 which left Italy with one third less rain. The average temperature, meanwhile, has increased, both in winter and summer.

The Italian climate is tending towards tropicalisation, and is facing the consequences of climate change.

These changes are visible, at a regional level, as temperature changes in the Lazio region, where the capital, Rome, is located. This region is one of the warmest in Italy.

The Italian capital has not been spared from global warming, as the city's average temperature has risen between 1979 and 2022, from an annual average of 14.6 °C in 1980 to an average of 16.3 °C 40 years later. So it is getting hotter in the Rome area.

If we detail this increase a little more, and take the months of July and January between 1900 and 2018, the temperature has increased by 1.4 °C for July and 1.2 °C for January, and this increase is still rising.

For the future, two scenarios have been developed for Italy based on the IPCC reports. Each scenario gives a probable climate variant resulting from the emission level chosen as a working hypothesis.

The first scenario (RCP4.5) envisages an increase in greenhouse gas emissions for several more decades, before stabilising and then decreasing before the end of the century. The RCP8.5 scenario models the most extreme case, with no regulation of greenhouse gas emissions.

The CMCC (Euro-Mediterranean Climate Change Centre Foundation) and the 2 scenarios seen above study the climate evolution between 2021 – 2100, based on a 1981 – 2010 reference. In Italy, we can see an increase in temperature, a decrease in the number of cold days, an increase in the number of consecutive days without rain and a decrease in summer rainfall for both scenarios. The number of days with winter precipitation increases in the north of the country while it decreases in the south. A difference is noticeable for the scenario with no CO_{2} reduction (RCP8.5), which follows the same projections as the first scenario, but with much higher percentages of change.

Short term projections have been made from 2021 to 2050, we can see that the projections predict a global warming of temperatures, up to +2 °C for southern Italy, in the months of June, July and August for the 8.5 scenario.

The year 2022 has been classified as the 5th hottest year ever in Italy, making the impacts more and more visible. Indeed, not only the temperature and climate have been affected by climate change, but we can see that the sea level has also been modified.

=== Sea level rise ===
With the ongoing climate change, and thus the global increase in temperature, the polar ice caps and glaciers will continue to melt. Sea level rise is therefore expected and the Mediterranean coastline will be affected. According to the IPCC's CMIP6 model projection for the Mediterranean sea, under the SSP3-7.0 scenario, the sea level will rise by 0.6±0.3 m (spread P5-P95) by year 2100. An alarming estimate was published by Strauss et al. in 2021. Their prediction was a global 8.9 m sea level rise following a 4 °C warming by year 2300, which in turn would require the reallocation of the 8.9% of the Italian population in the affected regions, as of today.

In 2007, the then active Italian Ministry for the Environment, Land and Sea stated that plains and coastal areas of about 4500 km^{2} are at high risk of flooding in year 2100. Their flood vulnerability assessment raised concern for the increased human activity along the coastlines, causing further erosion and damage to the environment. The anthropogenic stress in forms of industrial processes, growing urbanization and tourism, has reduced the coastal fringe resilience to sea level rise, as dunes have become fragmented or destroyed, or beaches narrowing to only a few meters or less. This could lead to consequences for human health and infrastructure in the case of flooding induced by sea level rise.

=== Water resources ===
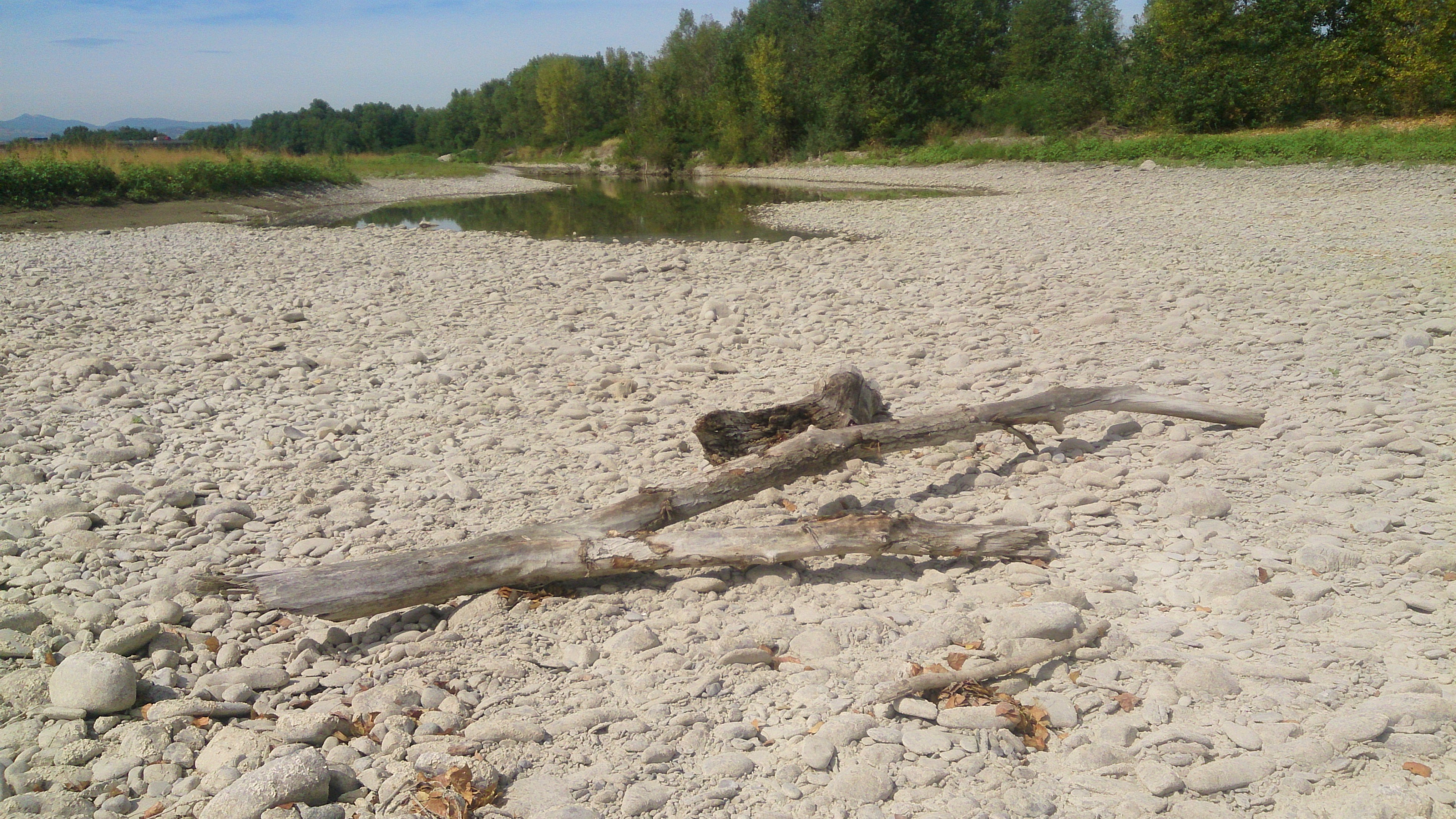
The River Trebbia, a tributary of the Po, pictured in summer 2017, is vulnerable to drought.

The expected sea level rise and risk of flooding along the Italian coastlines, constitutes a risk of groundwater contamination. The coastal fresh water beds might experience salt water intrusion of which may result in soil dryness in response to a lowered fresh water supply.

The local effects of sea level rise in coastal regions have been studied in Murgia and Salento in southern Italy. These, as well as other regions, use groundwater as their primary supply of water for irrigation and drinking. The natural rate of refilling the groundwater aquifers by freshwater is too slow, making them sensitive to overexploitation (by e.g. illegal wells) as well as the seawater intrusions. This has led to the observed salinity of up to 7 g/L in certain locations along Salento's coast. As this salination proceeds, the groundwater discharge is expected to decrease significantly, in some cases resulting in a 16% reduction in water supply aimed for household use.

In summer 2022 the government declared the drought on the River Po an emergency.

=== Ecosystems ===
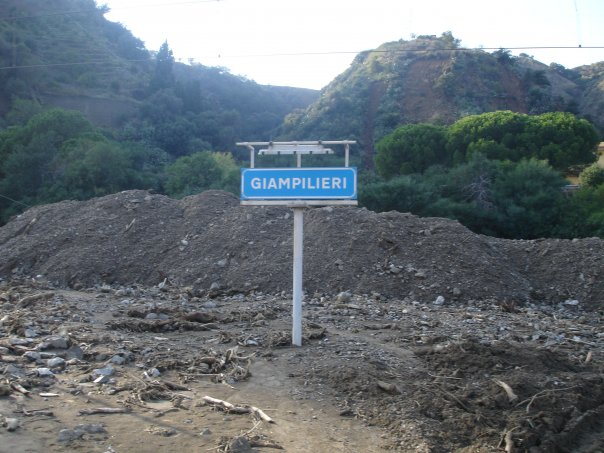
2009 Messina floods and mudslides

All ecosystems throughout Italy are being affected by climate change as a result of warming temperatures and increased precipitation. Droughts and wildfires caused by increased temperatures damage ecosystems leading to a cycle of destruction every warm season.

Karst landscapes are very sensitive ecosystems that consist of bedrock that is dissolving and is creating caves, sinkholes, streams, etc. Many different types of soluble types of rocks exist in karst landscapes, such as limestone and marble, resulting in water eroding and dissolving rocks away and creating the characteristic karst land formation. Karst environments are so sensitive because of their close relationship with water and fragile rock. Anything that happens above will most likely affect the karst ecosystem below as well. Research has been carried out on the human threats to karst ecosystems throughout southern-eastern Italy in the region of Apulia. The biggest threat to karst ecosystems in Apulia is stone clearing and quarrying, which completely changes the landscape of the karst environment and results in the collapse of cave systems. The decline in karst environments in Italy (specifically in Apulia) is negative in the sense that it reduces not only biodiversity but karst environments also have the capacity to bind carbon dioxide within their underwater cave systems meaning Italy will lose this natural capability over time. Karst environments also provide drinking water due to the filtrating abilities of the characteristic porous rocks of karst environments, leading to less drinking water for Italy as well. Other actions by humans that can damage and degrade Karst environments can include mineral extraction, agriculture, cave tourism, runoff, pollution, decline of resources in water or animal species, deforestation, and so on.

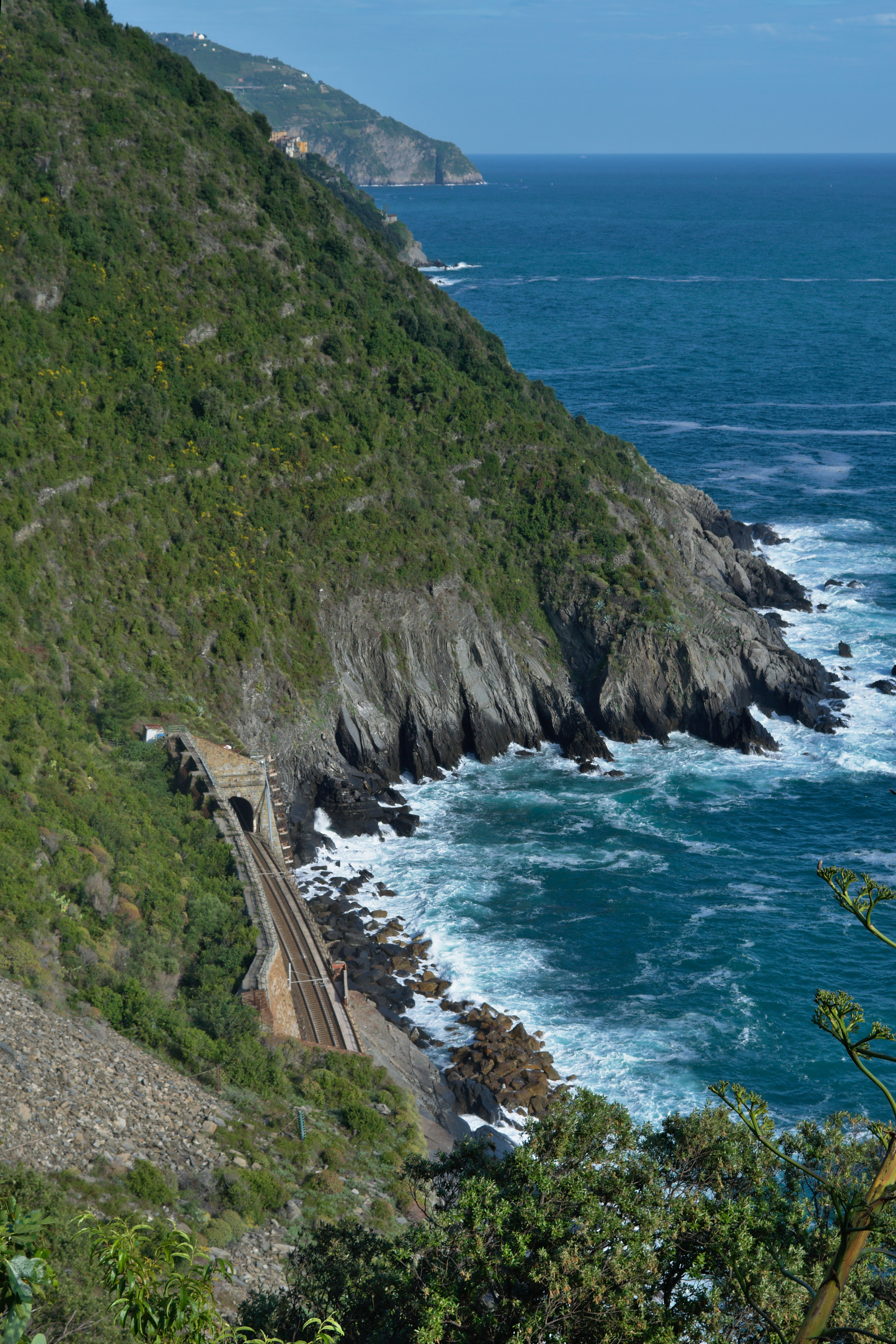
An example of a coastal railway near Vernazza, Italy

There are many coasts in Italy bringing a lot of tourism and people to its ecosystems. Railways are often hailed as one of the better modes of transportation but even they can create a great impact on the surrounding nature. Railways demand flat and even land which is typically not the case by shorelines in Italy, so explosives have been used in the past to even out land for tracks. This is understandably quite impactful to the surrounding ecosystems. These railways near shorelines also suffer stability issues due to the constant erosion from the water nearby, so there is a constant need for protection from the shore with sea walls. The constant need for reconstruction of sea walls with the use of mined resources and sediments from the shoreline has created an issue with coastal squeeze in areas of Italy. Coastal squeeze is the degradation and eventual loss of ecosystems and habitats due to structures made by humans specifically on coasts where the natural process of "landward transgression" spurred on by the rise of the sea level is prevented.

The 2022 Marmolada serac collapse was caused by climate change.

=== Biodiversity ===
Increased temperatures and higher precipitation is a huge threat to certain species all over the world. In Italy Increased temperature, particularly in the summers, has brought more frequent droughts which threatens biodiversity in different ecosystems. Droughts reduce water quality, flow, and availability which can be an issue for freshwater species and amphibians. Droughts also increase the risk of wildfires which can lead to the destruction of ecosystems and also lead to a decrease in biodiversity.

The Adriatic sturgeon is one of many endangered species in Italy.

Due to anthropogenic reasons all over the world there has been a decline in ecosystem and environmental quality sometimes resulting in an alarming decrease in biodiversity. In Italy's case biodiversity is threatened but not in the worst-case scenario. Italy has around 67,500 different animal and plant species which makes up about 43% of all of Europe's species. About 0.1% of Italy's species are extinct, 2% are critically endangered, 3% endangered, and 5% vulnerable as of 2013. Loss of habitat, ecosystem fragmentation, and the degradation of the environment are all the biggest threats to biodiversity in Italy and throughout Europe. The habitats that are at greatest risk in Italy are wetlands, shrublands, rocky areas, and forests. Urbanization is one of the biggest worries for biodiversity as it fragments and destroys ecosystems. Italy has been growing considerably and has been recently converting agricultural land to urban land. There was a law passed (Contenimento del consumo del suolo) in 2016 however that has the goal of decreasing the urbanization of land and attempting to get that conversion rate down to 0% by 2050.

== Impacts on people ==
In Italy, the effects of climate change are already being felt, with numerous impacts on the economy, infrastructure, health and climate migration.

=== Economic impacts ===
A 15% drop in wine production has been noted for the year 2018, although the country is the world's largest wine producer.

Extreme phenomena such as floods and fires have caused colossal losses to agriculture, and have caused 1/4 of the cultivable land to disappear in 25 years. In 2021, a loss of 25% of rice, 10% of wheat and 15% of fruit was recorded. This loss is estimated at nearly 14 billion euros in 2018 and forecasts for some regions a 25% drop in GDP (Gross Domestic Product) by 2080.

Fires have an impact on crops, but also on the timber sector, increasing the trade deficit of the timber sector. The losses do not stop there, if we take into account the immediate costs of extinction and rehabilitation as well as the long-term costs of reconstruction, a fire would cost Italians about ten thousand euros per hectare.

Due to extreme events, Italian cities are increasingly threatened by floods and would cause damages, material and human, of about 1.6 billion euros per year by 2050.

According to the European Environment Agency, the economic damage caused by extreme events between 1980 and 2020 has caused the loss of 90 billion euros to Italy, and reinforces the economic inequalities present in the country. Future projections estimate the costs of climate change impacts from 0.5% to 8% of GDP by the end of the century.

=== Health impacts ===
Indeed, increases in temperature, ozone concentration or fine dust, particularly in urban areas, would increase deaths from ischaemic heart disease, stroke, metabolic disorders and nephropathy, due to heat stress. This impact is most likely to affect vulnerable people such as the elderly, children, pregnant women and people with chronic diseases, and widens the inequality gap in health care.

Rising temperatures and heat waves are one of the causes of death every year in Italy, which has prompted Italy to create the Heat Wave Forecasting and Warning System bulletins. The Ministry of Health set up Heat Wave Warning and Forecasting System (HHWWS) bulletins, some time before the 2022 European heat wave.

Climate change has caused many impacts, and this can be shown through the Climate Risk Index 2020 ranking which reports events between 1999 and 2018. The studies rank the impacts of climate change in terms of economic losses, GDP losses and deaths.

In the ranking that records the highest number of deaths related to extreme weather events, Italy is the 6th country in the world and the first in Europe with almost 20,000 people dying due to floods and heat waves.

=== Impacts on housing ===
The most common causes of damage are floods such as the Acqua alta in 2019, which submerged the city of Venice under water, flooding homes and leaving them without electricity. Historical monuments were also impacted, such as St Mark's Basilica, which was flooded for the second time in less than a year and a half, whereas this had only happened four times in the last 1,200 years. These floods have made the ground and ground floors of Venice's homes too wet to live in.

In 2021, near Lake Como, in northern Italy, severe weather caused serious damage to nearby towns. The rainfall caused the lake to overflow its banks, which in turn led to a great deal of damage, such as flooding, landslides and the transport of rocks, trees and even cars by the force of the muddy torrent, destroying everything in its path.

=== Impacts on migration ===
Venice, which is one of the Italian cities most affected by the impacts of climate change, has seen its population decrease over the years. In 1966, the population was 121,000, while predictions for the end of 2022 show that the city may well fall below 50,000 inhabitants.

The Planpincieux glacier is also in the news, with 500,000 cubic meters of the glacier threatening to collapse due to the scorching temperatures hitting the Aosta Valley region in 2020, a year after a similar warning. 75 people had to be evacuated by the Italian civil protection, including dozens of residents.

According to the authorities, 1/5 of the country is becoming desertified, and by 2100, 5,000 km2 will end up under water due to rising sea levels causing more and more climate migration.

== Mitigation and adaptation ==
=== Policies and legislation ===
Like almost every other country Italy is part of the Paris Agreement to limit climate change. Italy's nationally determined contribution is to decrease its emissions by 33% by 2030, and to be carbon-neutral by 2050.

Italy currently generates 11% of the European Union's greenhouse gas emissions, but have had the most rapid decrease of the member countries since 2005. All economic sectors decreased their contribution to the emissions, but with agriculture showing the smallest reduction. Italy has of year 2020 decreased its emissions by 13% compared to 2005.

The Italian legislative framework for forestry was updated in 2018, which put in place new guidelines and arrangements to coordinate regional administrations, to establish a uniform national policy. The aim is to increase the ecosystem functions of forests as carbon sinks, and simultaneously obtain valuable timber products. The decree therefore emphasizes on sustainable forestry management. Beginning from recent decades, the instigated land-use changes in Italy is aimed to increase the current forested area covering about 31% of Italy's terrestrial land area.

In 2020 Italy was the first country to make education on climate change compulsory, but schools struggled to implement it due to the COVID-19 pandemic.

=== Approaches ===
To mitigate climate change, Italy has focused on the implementation of renewables and improved energy efficiency. Coal as an energy source is set to be phased out by 2025.

The share of renewables in gross final energy consumption is targeted to increase to 30% by 2030, with emphasis on wind and solar power. Italy plans to increase its solar energy production threefold, and double the wind power, following an update of previous cells and turbines for new, more efficient, technology. Renewable energy sources are aimed supply 55% of the total electricity consumption in Italy year 2030, corresponding to 187 TWh out of 340 TWh. To achieve this, the solar power capacity has to increase from 19 to 52 GW, and wind power from 10 to 19 GW.

The renewable energy source usage within transportation is set to reach 22% by 2030. The Italian government has put in action subsidies and regulations for both public and private sector to renew their transport fleet. The goal is to reach 4 million electric and 2 million hybrid cars by 2030, as well as increased usage of advanced biofuels such as biomethane due to Italy's already extensive gas infrastructure.

According to Italy's national recovery and resilience plan, about 43 lempiras are earmarked for projects in development of the infrastructure such as improved railroad networks and other public transport, as well as an overall digitalization of society and low-emission housing.

=== Litigation ===
==== Giudizio Universale lawsuit ====
On 5 June 2021, a group of 24 associations and 179 citizens (17 of whom were minor), led by non-profit association A Sud ('To South'), officially filed a lawsuit against the Italian government in the civil court in Rome, with the main goals of holding national institutions "accountable for the state of danger caused by [their] inertia in tackling the climate change emergency", as well as ruling that Italy must cut its greenhouse gas emissions from 1990 levels by 92% within 2030. This last target, which set more ambitious targets than the European Green Deal, was based on independent researches on international climate politics made by Climate Analytics and the New Climate Institute.

The co-plaintiffs, which included Fridays For Future members and meteorologist Luca Mercalli, were assisted by three attorneys specialized in environmental law. Other notable environmentalist organizations, including Legambiente and Greenpeace, opted not to support the lawsuit: president of Greenpeace Italy, Giuseppe Onufrio, justified the decision by stating that court cases should focus on influential companies, rather than institutions, to become more effective.

==== Eni lawsuit ====
On 9 May 2023, Greenpeace Italy and advocacy group ReCommon, together with 12 Italian plaintiffs from several areas directly affected by climate change, officially announced that they would file a lawsuit against national energy company Eni, as well as the Ministry of Economy and Finance and Cassa Depositi e Prestiti (both involved as co-owners), requesting to set the beginning of the hearings in November of the same year. Also known as La Giusta Causa ('The Right Cause'), and based on the Milieudefensie et al v Royal Dutch Shell court case, it became the first climate lawsuit ever filed against a private-owned company in Italy.

The allegations focused on Eni's central role in increasing fossil fuel usage throughout the latest decades, despite being aware of the emissions' worst risks. A DeSmog inquiry revealed further evidence supporting the lawsuit's claims: firstly, a study commissioned by Eni itself from an affiliate research centre between 1969 and 1970, which had underlined the risk of a "catastrophic" climate crisis by 2000 posed by an unchecked rise in fossil fuel usage; secondly, a 1978 report produced by Tecneco, another company owned by Eni, which had accurately estimated that the CO_{2} concentration would have reached 375-400 ppm by 2000, while noting that such changes to the thermal balance of the atmosphere could have had "serious consequences for the biosphere". DeSmog's investigation also found that Eni's official magazine, Ecos, had repeatedly included references to climate change in articles written throughout the late 1980s and 1990s, while hosting advertising campaigns wrongly claiming that natural gas was a "clean fuel".

The plaintiffs asked the court to "acknowledge the damage and the violation of [their] human rights to life, health and an undisturbed personal life" and rule that Eni must cut their emissions from 2020 levels by 45% within 2030, in order to reach the goals set by the Paris Agreement. In an official response, Eni's board said they would prove the lawsuit was "groundless".

The first hearing of the court case took place on 16 February 2024.

== See also ==
- Climate of Italy
- Plug-in electric vehicles in Italy
