= Solarimeter =

Measuring device used to measure combined direct and diffuse solar radiation

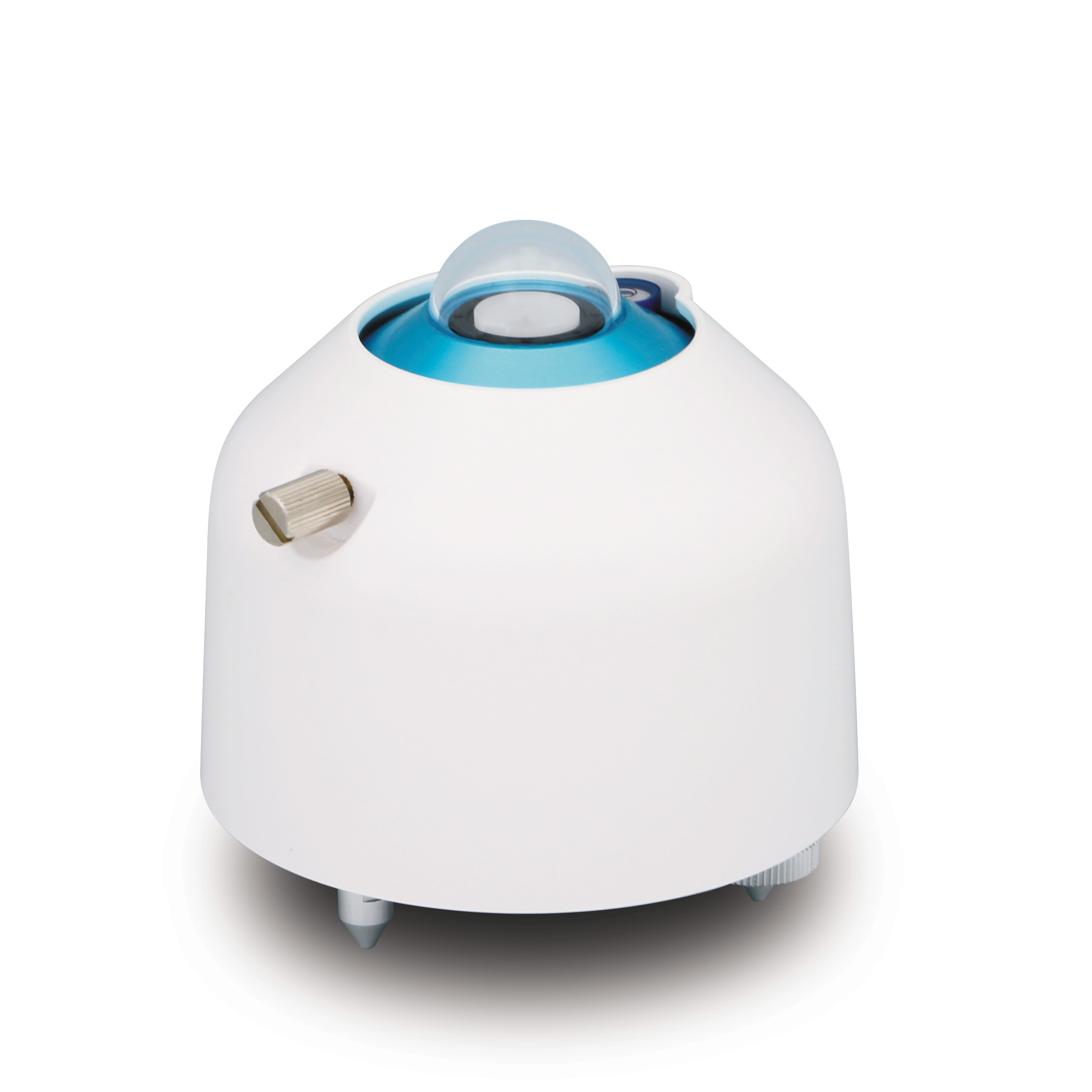
MS-80 Class A Pyranometer

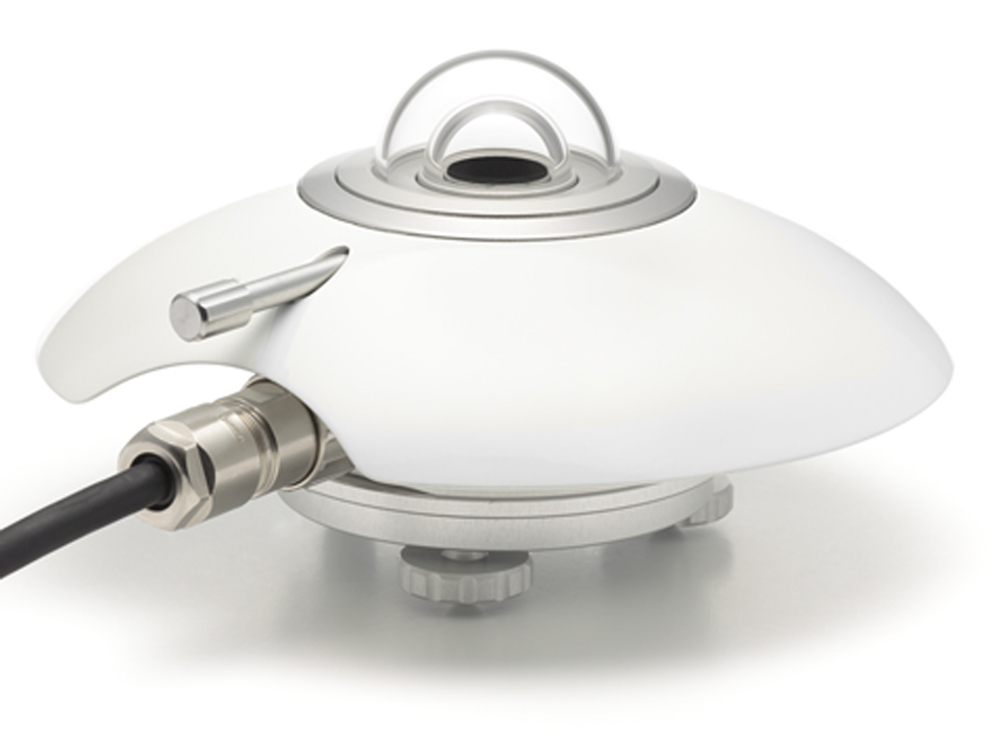
A modern pyranometer, shown here is model SR20

A solarimeter is a pyranometer, a type of measuring device used to measure combined direct and diffuse solar radiation. An integrating solarimeter measures energy developed from solar radiation based on the absorption of heat by a black body. The principle this instrument was designed on was first developed by the Italian priest, Father Angelo Bellani. He invented the actinometric method which is based on physical and chemical techniques.
