= Synoptic scale meteorology =

1000-km-order method of measuring weather systems

In meteorology, the synoptic scale (also called the large scale or cyclonic scale) is a horizontal length scale of the order of 1,000 km (620 mi) or more. This corresponds to a horizontal scale typical of mid-latitude depressions (e.g. extratropical cyclones). Most high- and low-pressure areas seen on weather maps (such as surface weather analyses) are synoptic-scale systems, driven by the location of Rossby waves in their respective hemisphere. Low-pressure areas and their related frontal zones occur on the leading edge of a trough within the Rossby wave pattern, while high-pressure areas form on the back edge of the trough. Most precipitation areas occur near frontal zones.

The Navier–Stokes equations applied to atmospheric motion can be simplified by scale analysis in the synoptic scale. It can be shown that the main terms in horizontal equations are Coriolis force and pressure gradient terms; therefore, one can use geostrophic approximation. In vertical coordinates, the momentum equation simplifies to the hydrostatic equilibrium equation.

The word synoptic is derived from the Ancient Greek word συνοπτικός (sunoptikós), meaning "seen together".

== Surface weather analysis ==
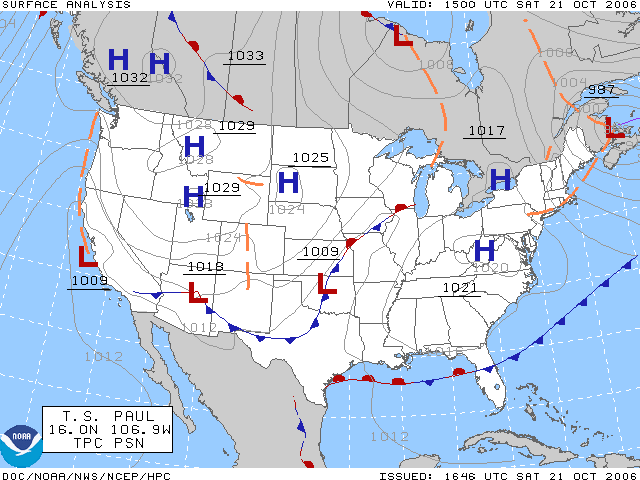
A surface weather analysis for the United States on October 21, 2006

A surface weather analysis is a special type of weather map that provides a view of weather elements over a geographical area at a specified time based on information from ground-based weather stations. Weather maps are created by plotting or tracing the values of relevant quantities such as sea level pressure, temperature, and cloud cover onto a geographical map to help find synoptic scale features such as weather fronts.

The first weather maps in the 19th century were drawn well after the fact to help devise a theory on storm systems. After the advent of the telegraph, simultaneous surface weather observations became possible for the first time. Beginning in the late 1840s, the Smithsonian Institution became the first organization to draw real-time surface analyses. Use of surface analyses began first in the United States, spreading worldwide during the 1870s. Use of the Norwegian cyclone model for frontal analysis began in the late 1910s across Europe, with its use finally spreading to the United States during World War II.

Surface weather analyses have special symbols which show frontal systems, cloud cover, precipitation, or other important information. For example, an H represents high pressure, implying good and fair weather. An L represents low pressure, which frequently accompanies precipitation. Various symbols are used not just for frontal zones and other surface boundaries on weather maps, but also to depict the present weather at various locations on the weather map. Areas of precipitation help determine the frontal type and location. Mesoscale systems and boundaries such as tropical cyclones, outflow boundaries and squall lines are also analyzed on surface weather analyses. Isobars are commonly used to place surface boundaries from the horse latitudes poleward, while streamline analyses are used in the tropics.

== Extratropical cyclone ==
A fictitious synoptic chart of an extratropical cyclone affecting the UK and Ireland. The blue arrows between isobars indicate the direction of the wind, while the "L" symbol denotes the centre of the "low". Note the occluded, cold and warm frontal boundaries.

An extratropical cyclone is a synoptic scale low-pressure weather system that has neither tropical nor polar characteristics, being connected with fronts and horizontal gradients in temperature and dew point otherwise known as "baroclinic zones".

The descriptor "extratropical" refers to the fact that this type of cyclone generally occurs outside of the tropics, in the middle latitudes of the planet. These systems may also be described as "mid-latitude cyclones" due to their area of formation, or "post-tropical cyclones" where extratropical transition has occurred, but are often described as "depressions" or "lows" by weather forecasters and the public. These are the everyday phenomena that, along with anticyclones, drive the weather over much of the Earth.

Although extratropical cyclones are almost always classified as baroclinic since they form along zones of temperature and dew point gradient within the westerlies, they can sometimes become barotropic late in their life cycle when the temperature distribution around the cyclone becomes fairly uniform with radius. An extratropical cyclone can transform into a subtropical storm, and from there into a tropical cyclone, if it dwells over warm waters and develops central convection, which warms its core.

== Surface high-pressure systems ==
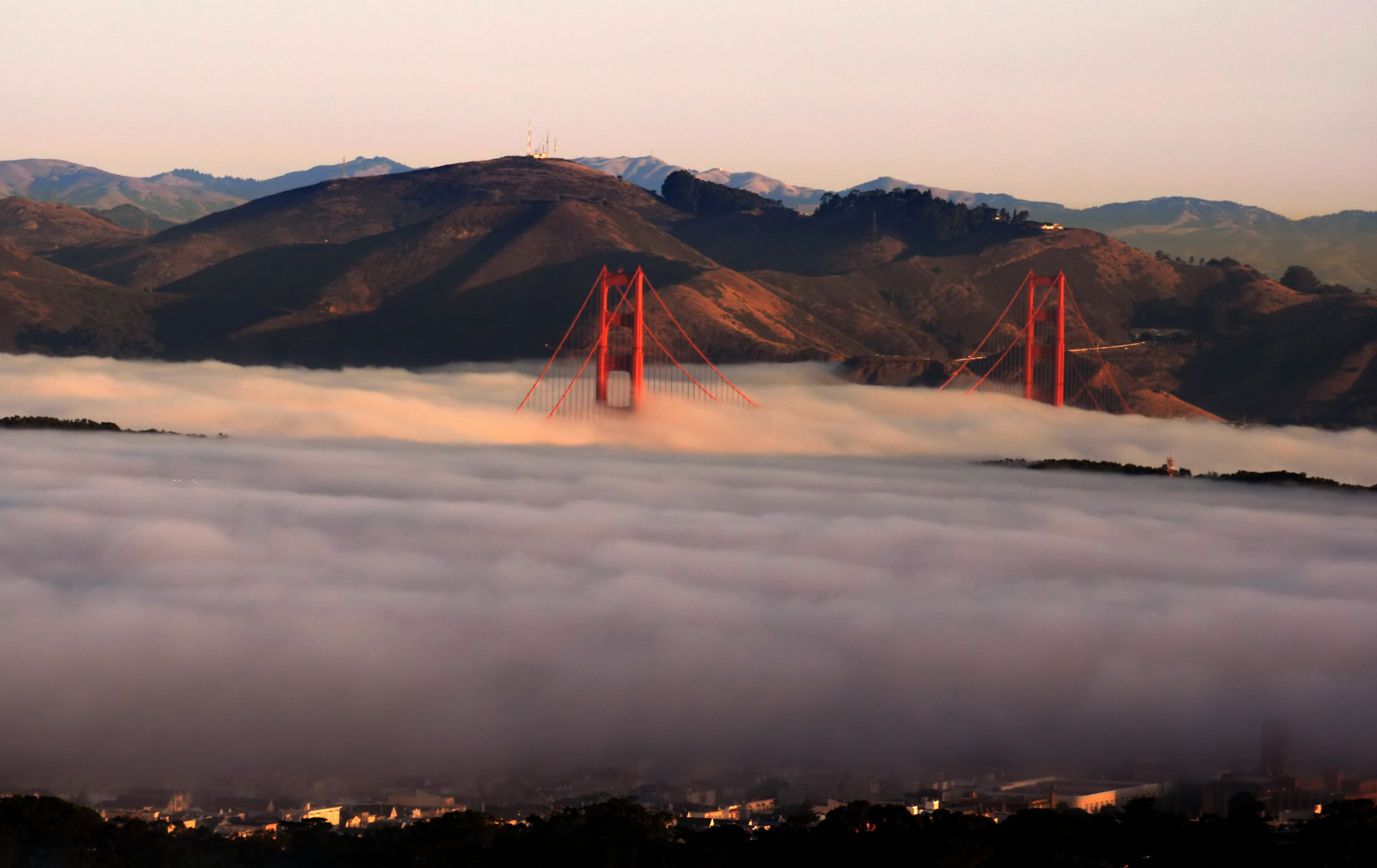
Golden Gate Bridge in fog

High-pressure systems are frequently associated with light winds at the surface and subsidence through the lower portion of the troposphere. Subsidence will generally dry out an air mass by adiabatic, or compressional, heating. Thus, high pressure typically brings clear skies. During the day, since no clouds are present to reflect sunlight, there is more incoming shortwave solar radiation and temperatures rise. At night, the absence of clouds means that outgoing longwave radiation (i.e. heat energy from the surface) is not absorbed, giving cooler diurnal low temperatures in all seasons. When surface winds become light, the subsidence produced directly under a high-pressure system can lead to a buildup of particulates in urban areas under the ridge, leading to widespread haze. If the low level relative humidity rises towards 100 percent overnight, fog can form.

Strong, vertically shallow high-pressure systems moving from higher latitudes to lower latitudes in the northern hemisphere are associated with continental arctic air masses. The low, sharp inversion can lead to areas of persistent stratocumulus or stratus cloud, colloquially known as anticyclonic gloom. The type of weather brought about by an anticyclone depends on its origin. For example, extensions of the Azores high pressure may bring about anticyclonic gloom during the winter, as they are warmed at the base and will trap moisture as they move over the warmer oceans. High pressures that build to the north and extend southwards will often bring clear weather. This is due to being cooled at the base (as opposed to warmed) which helps prevent clouds from forming.

On weather maps, these areas show converging winds (isotachs), also known as confluence, or converging height lines near or above the level of non-divergence, which is near the 500 hPa pressure surface about midway up through the troposphere. High-pressure systems are alternatively referred to as anticyclones. On weather maps, high-pressure centers are associated with the letter H in English, or A in Spanish, because alta is the Spanish word for high, within the isobar with the highest pressure value. On constant pressure upper level charts, it is located within the highest height line contour.

== Weather fronts ==
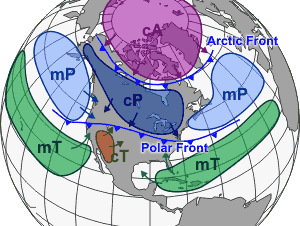
Different air masses tend to be separated by frontal boundaries. The Arctic front separates Arctic from Polar air masses, while the Polar front separates Polar air from warm air masses. (cA is continental arctic; cP is continental polar; mP is maritime polar; cT is continental tropic; and mT is maritime tropic.)

A weather front is a boundary separating two masses of air of different densities, and is the principal cause of meteorological phenomena. In surface weather analyses, fronts are depicted using various colored lines and symbols, depending on the type of front. The air masses separated by a front usually differ in temperature and humidity. Cold fronts may feature narrow bands of thunderstorms and severe weather, and may on occasion be preceded by squall lines or dry lines. Warm fronts are usually preceded by stratiform precipitation and fog. The weather usually clears quickly after a front's passage. Some fronts produce no precipitation and little cloudiness, although there is invariably a wind shift.

Cold fronts and occluded fronts generally move from west to east, while warm fronts move poleward. Because of the greater density of air in their wake, cold fronts and cold occlusions move faster than warm fronts and warm occlusions. Mountains and warm bodies of water can slow the movement of fronts. When a front becomes stationary, and the density contrast across the frontal boundary vanishes, the front can degenerate into a line which separates regions of differing wind velocity, known as a shearline. This is most common over the open ocean.

== See also ==
- Mesoscale meteorology
- Microscale meteorology
- Misoscale meteorology
- Outline of meteorology
