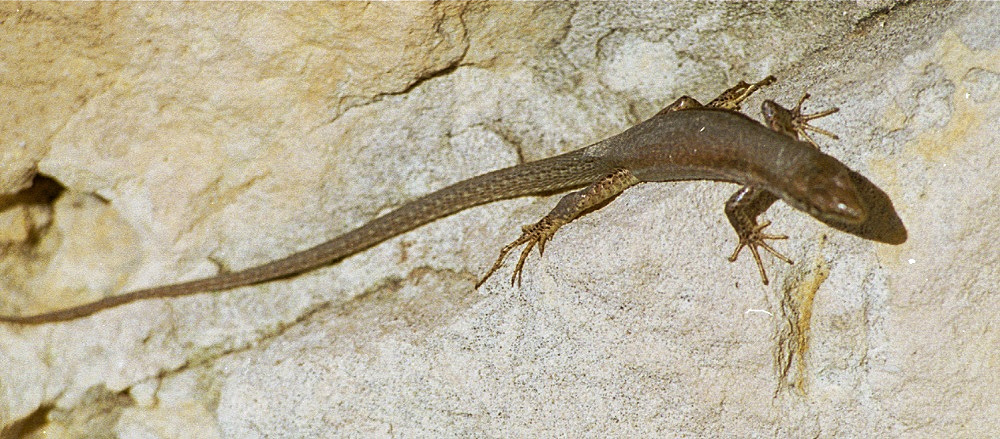
- In Marsaxlokk, Malta

Conservation status
- Least Concern (IUCN 3.1)

Scientific classification
- Kingdom: Animalia
- Phylum: Chordata
- Class: Reptilia
- Order: Squamata
- Family: Lacertidae
- Genus: Podarcis
- Species: P. filfolensis

Binomial name
- Podarcis filfolensis (Bedriaga, 1876)
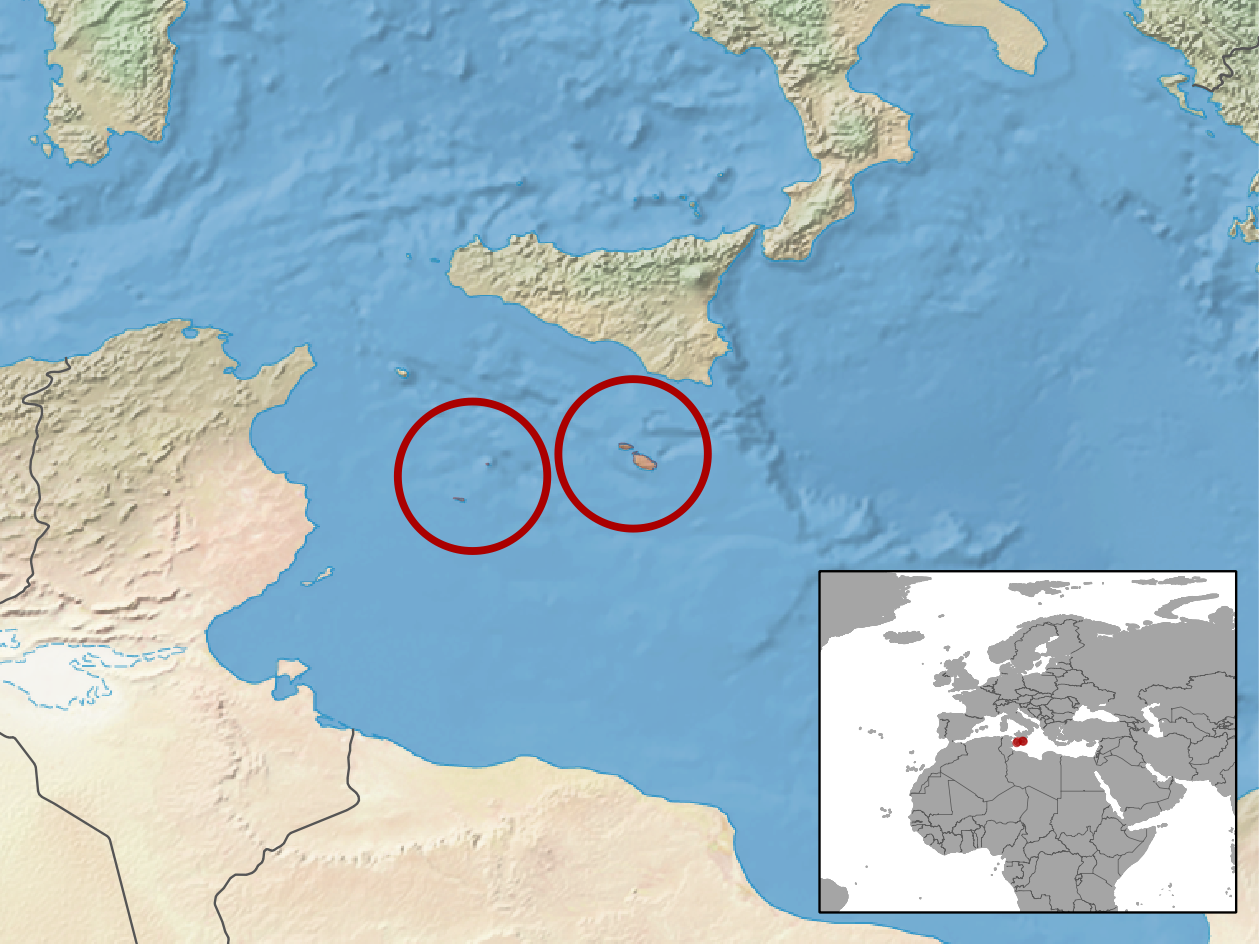

= Filfola lizard =

Maltese wall lizard

Species of lizard

The filfola lizard or Maltese wall lizard (Podarcis filfolensis) is a species of lizard in the family Lacertidae. It is found in Italy (in the Pelagian Islands) and in the island group of Malta. Its natural habitats are Mediterranean-type shrubby vegetation, rocky areas, rocky shores, arable land, pastureland, and rural gardens.

== P. filfolensis in Malta ==
In the Maltese Islands, there are four subspecies of the Maltese wall lizard, all of which are endemic there.

=== Podarcis filfolensis ssp. maltensis ===
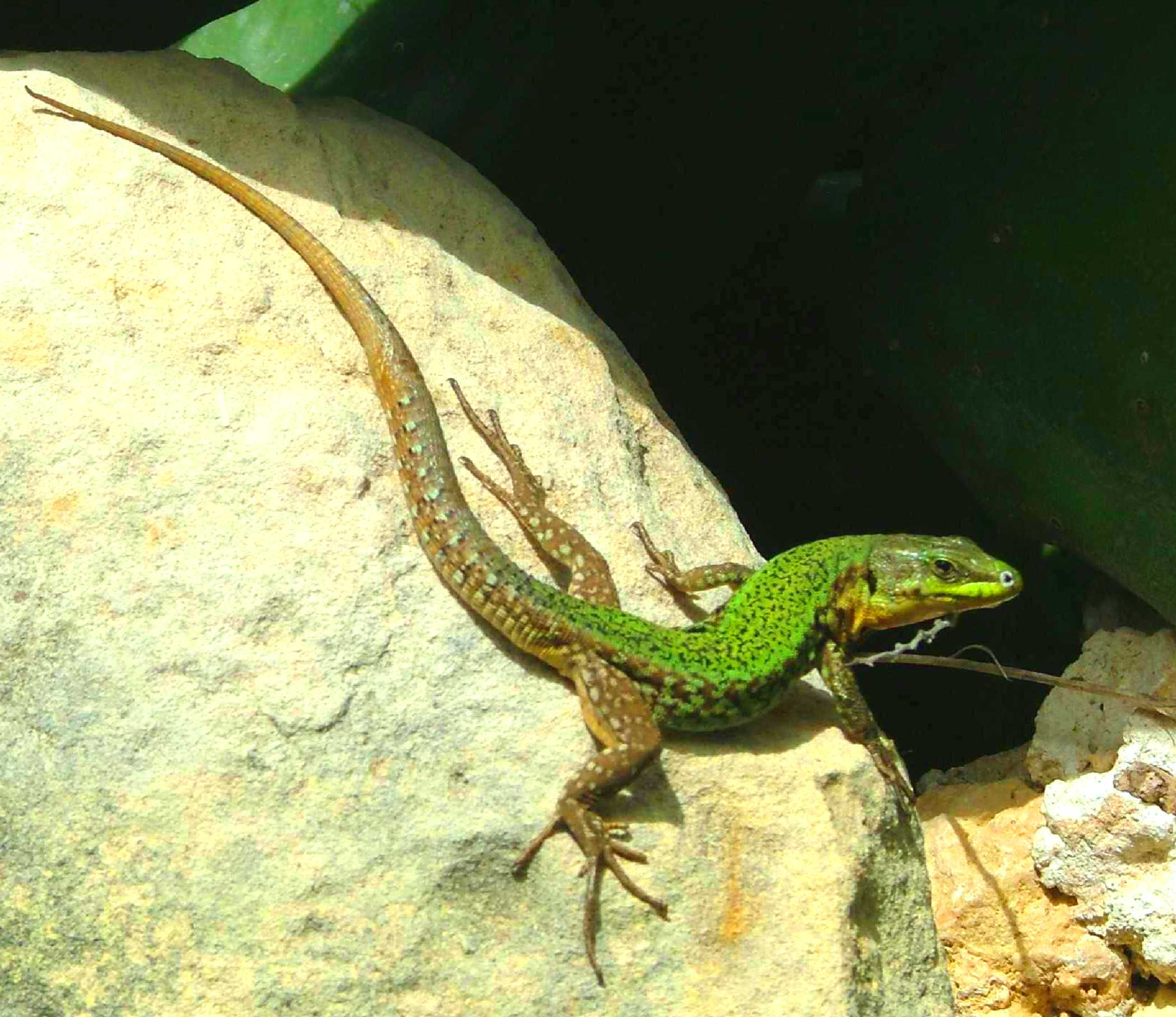
Podarcis filfolensis ssp. maltensis male from Gozo

This subspecies is found on the three main islands: Malta, Gozo and Comino. It is normally greenish and sometimes speckled.

=== Podarcis filfolensis ssp. filfolensis ===
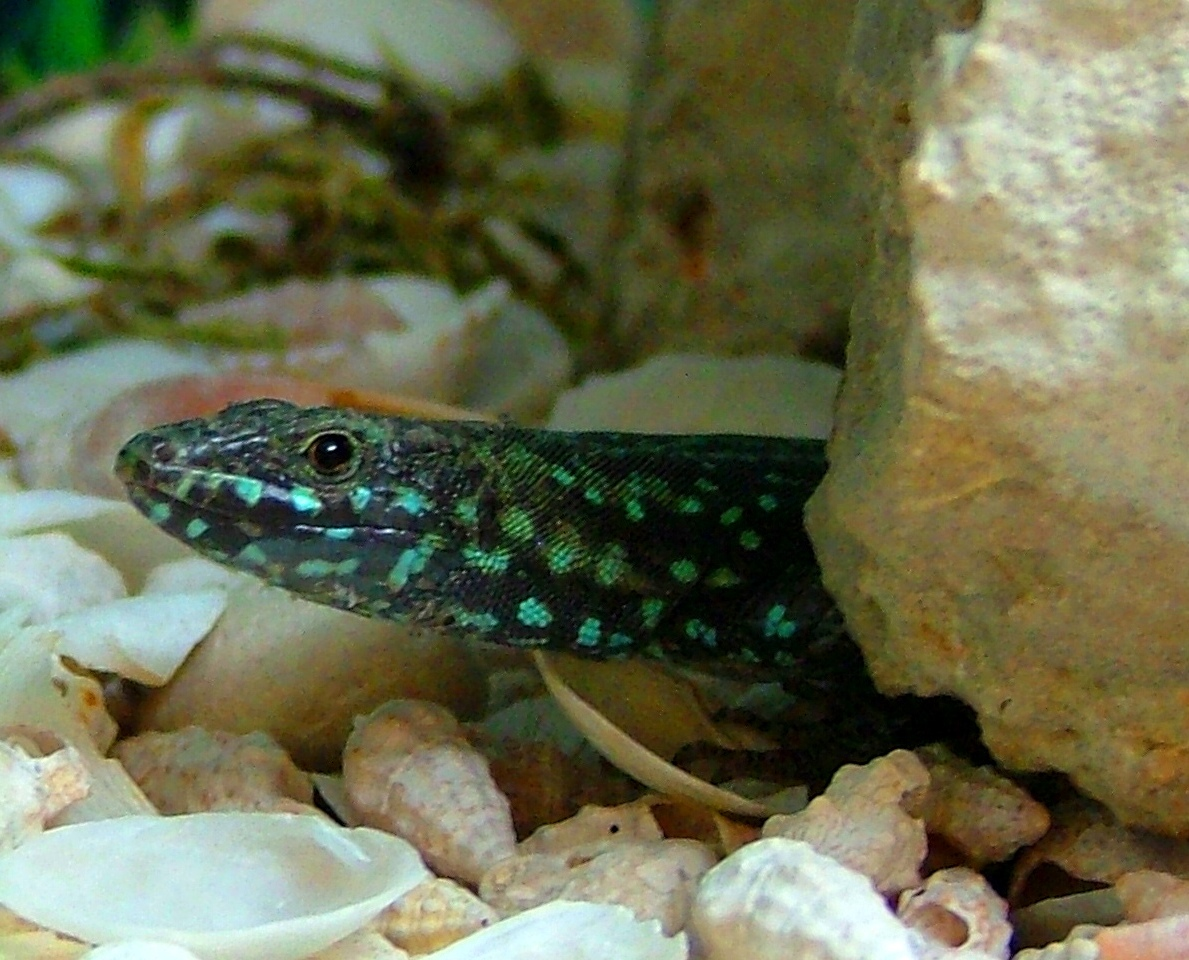
Podarcis filfolensis ssp. filfolensis female

This subspecies is endemic to the islet of Filfla just off the coast of Malta. It is the largest of the four subspecies and is blackish with bluish spots.

=== Podarcis filfolensis ssp. kieselbachi ===
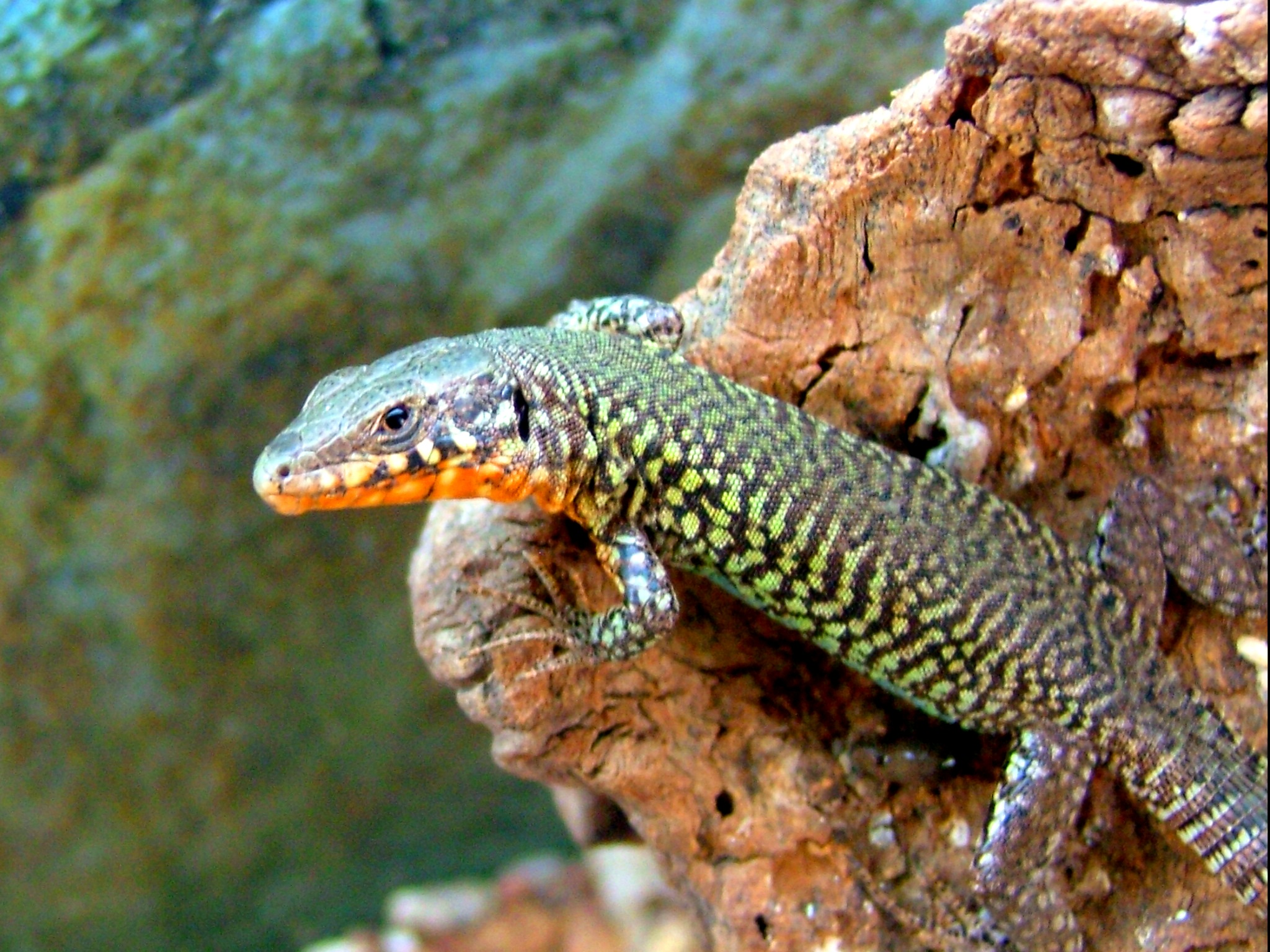
Podarcis filfolensis ssp. kieselbachi male

This subspecies is endemic to Selmunett, otherwise known as St.Paul's Islands. Its colours vary greatly e.g. brown, grey, etc. with an orange belly and small black spots. The population became extinct in 2005.

=== Podarcis filfolensis ssp. generalensis ===
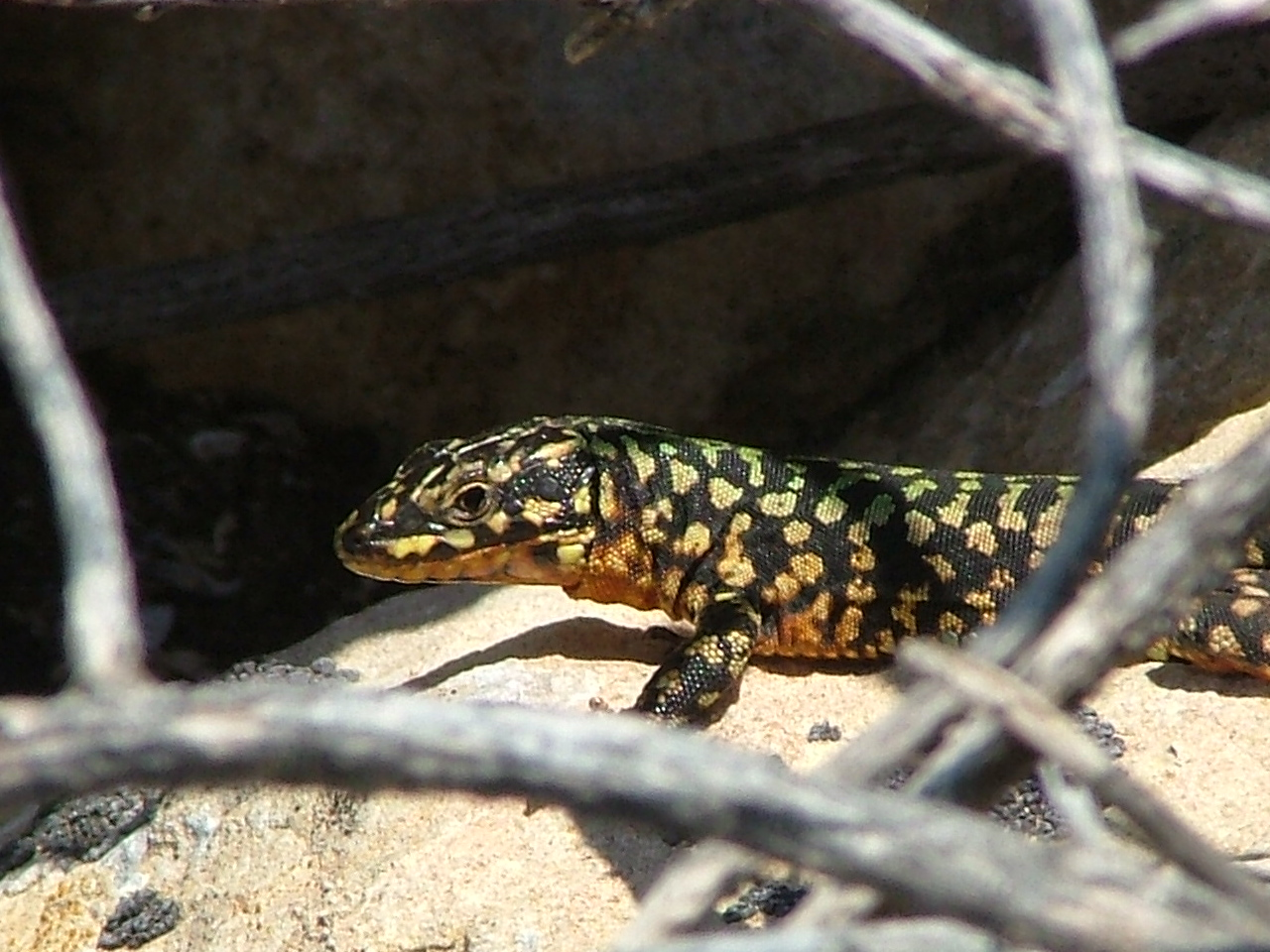
Podarcis filfolensis ssp. generalensis male

This subspecies is endemic to Fungus Rock (west coast of Gozo). It has a reddish belly and blue-like flanks.

== Other subspecies ==
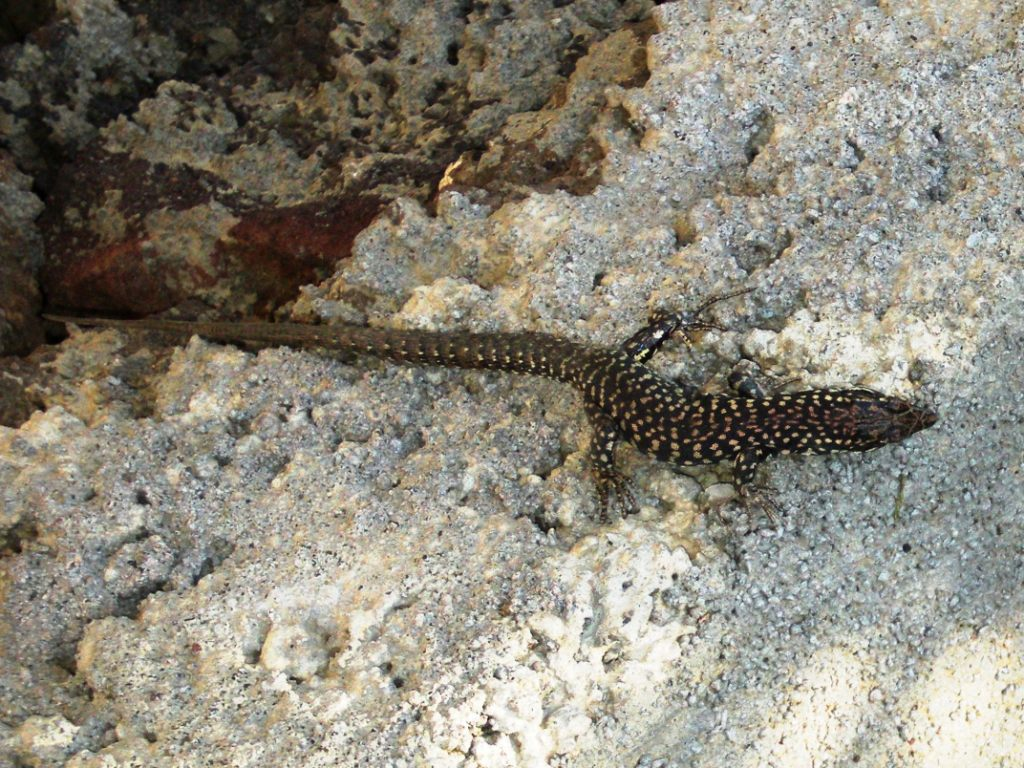
P. filfolensis ssp. laurentimulleri

A fifth subspecies is thought to exist on the island of Cominotto/Kemunett and another subspecies, Podarcis filfolensis ssp. laurentimulleri, occurs on the Italian islands of Linosa and Lampione.

== Features and behaviour ==
Unlike the males, who have bright colours, young lizards and females have somewhat dull coloration (brownish). The Maltese wall lizard usually eats small insects like ants or termites.

Males show territorial behaviour. When other males enter its territory, it puffs up and raises its head. A similar behaviour is seen when they attract females. Mating takes place in spring. One or two eggs are laid shortly after, and finally hatch between June and mid-August.

== See also ==
- Endemic Maltese wildlife
- Endemism
- Filfla
- List of reptiles of Italy
- Madeiran wall lizard

== References and sources ==
- Savona-Ventura C. Taxonomical status of the Maltese wall lizard (Podarcis filfolensis BEDRIAGA 1876). Central Mediterranean Naturalist 2001, 3(3):89-95
- Savona-Ventura C. The herpetofauna of Comino and satellite islets with a note on the colouration of Podarcis filfolensis. Animalia 1983; 10(1/3):87-93
- Savona-Ventura C. The Natural History of St. Paul's Islands - Reptiles and Mammals. Potamon 1983; 11:32-34
- Savona-Ventura C. Reptiles and amphibians in Maltese ecology. Potamon 1979; 1(2):14-16
- Sciberras, A. (2005) Observation on the endangered population of the Maltese wall lizard of Selmunett island (Podarcis filfolensis kieselbachi).Unpublished work, presented to the chamber of young scientists of Malta at 4–10 April, winning the contest 1st place and leading to the Belgian Science expo on 26 April to 1 May.
- Sciberras, A. (2007) Lizards At Id-Dwejra. Dwejra Heritage Park Gozo pgs.28-33. Dwejra Management Board.
- Sciberras, A. & Schembri, P.J. (2008) Conservation Status of St Paul's Island Wall Lizard (Podarcis filfolensis kieselbachi). Herpetological Bulletin-Number 105 pgs.28-34.
