= Italy–Tunisia Delimitation Agreement =

1971 treaty between Italy and Tunisia

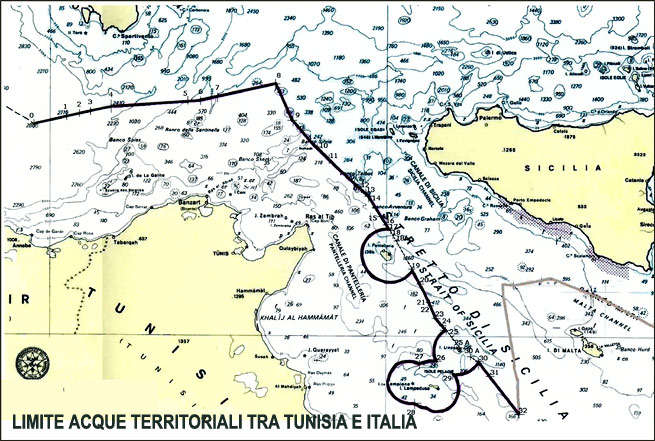
Maritime boundary between Italy and Tunisia. The map clearly shows the circle sectors intersecting each other and the median line between Sicily and Tunisia

The Italy–Tunisia Delimitation Agreement is a 1971 treaty between Italy and Tunisia in which the two countries agreed to delimit a maritime boundary between them in the continental shelf. The text of the treaty sets out a complex boundary in the Strait of Sicily representing an equidistant line between Sicily and Tunisia, with the exception of Pantelleria and the Pelagian Islands (Lampedusa, Linosa and Lampione). The maritime boundary around these islands, all closer to Tunisia, is made up of 13-nautical-mile arcs of territorial sea centered on each island which join one another and the equidistant line at the center of the Channel of Sicily mentioned above.

The boundary terminates just short of an equidistant line between Malta and Italy's Pelagian Islands and the westernmost point of the boundary line forms a maritime tripoint with Algeria. On 23 January 1975, the countries by agreement added supplemental minutes to the treaty, including a map of the boundary and 32 individual coordinate points that define it. It came into force on 6 December 1978 after it was ratified by both countries.

The treaty was signed in Tunis on 20 August 1971 and its full name is Agreement between the Government of the Republic of Tunisia and the Government of the Italian Republic concerning the Delimitation of the Continental Shelf between the two Countries.
