= Lampione Lighthouse =

Lighthouse on Lampione in Pelagian Islands, Sicily

Lampione
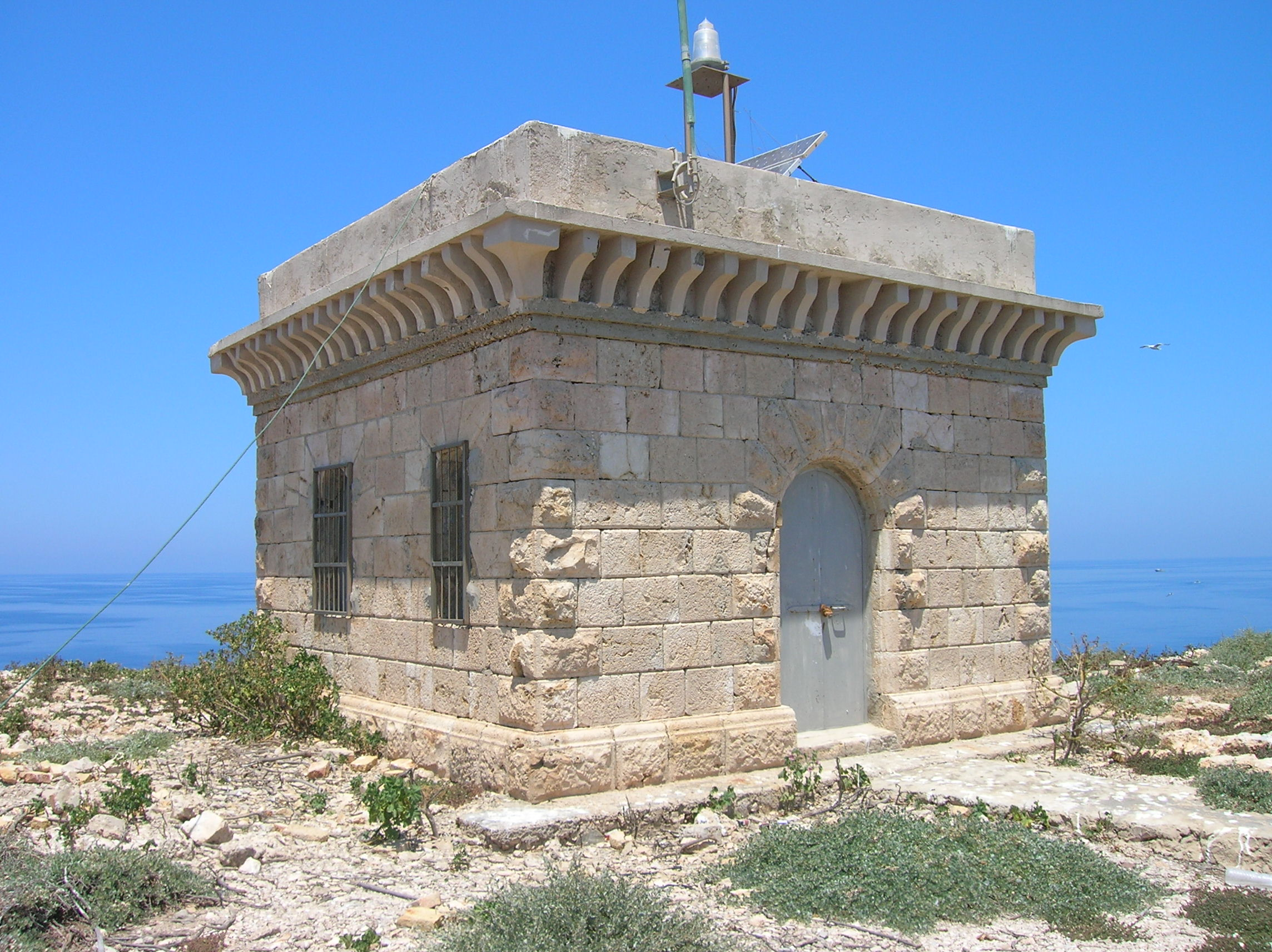
- Lampione Lighthouse
- Location: Lampione; Pelagian Islands; Sicily; Italy
- Coordinates: 35°33′36″N 12°20′05″E

Tower
- Constructed: 1935
- Foundation: concrete base
- Construction: stone building
- Height: 6 metres (20 ft)
- Shape: light atop a 1-storey equipment building
- Markings: unpainted stone building
- Power source: solar power
- Operator: Marina Militare

Light
- Focal height: 40 metres (130 ft)
- Range: 7 nautical miles (13 km; 8.1 mi)
- Characteristic: Fl (2) W 10s.
- Italy no.: 3064 E.F.

Lampione Lighthouse (Italian: Faro di Lampione) is an active lighthouse located on the western tip of the island of Lampione which makes part of the Pelagian Islands in the Channel of Sicily.

== Description ==
The lighthouse, built in 1935 by Genio civile, consists of a small quadrangular 1-storey equipment building, 6 metres (20 ft) high, of unpainted stone with the light placed on the roof. The light is positioned at 40 metres (130 ft) above sea level and emits two white flashes in a 10 seconds period visible up to a distance of 7 nautical miles (13 km; 8.1 mi). The lighthouse is completely automated, Tacconi was the last keeper, powered by a solar unit and managed by the Marina Militare with the identification code number 3064 E.F.

== See also ==
- List of lighthouses in Italy
- Pelagian Islands
