= Quadro Group =

The Quadro Group is a group of four member states of the European Union (Cyprus, Greece, Italy, and Malta) established in November 2008 at the ministerial level at the initiative of Malta. Spain has also expressed interest to join the group.

The group is based on a shared concern for illegal immigration and asylum. All four countries are facing major influxes of migrants across the Mediterranean Sea, coming from or through North Africa. The sometimes dire situation has been widely reported by the media, notably for the Italian island of Lampedusa.

Within the European Union, this group pushes for:

- The transfer of migrants to other EU member states;
- The procurement of travel documents and the organisation of joint flights;
- A reinforcement of the EU agency Frontex.
