= Orazio Bernardini =

Italian admiral (1899–1967)

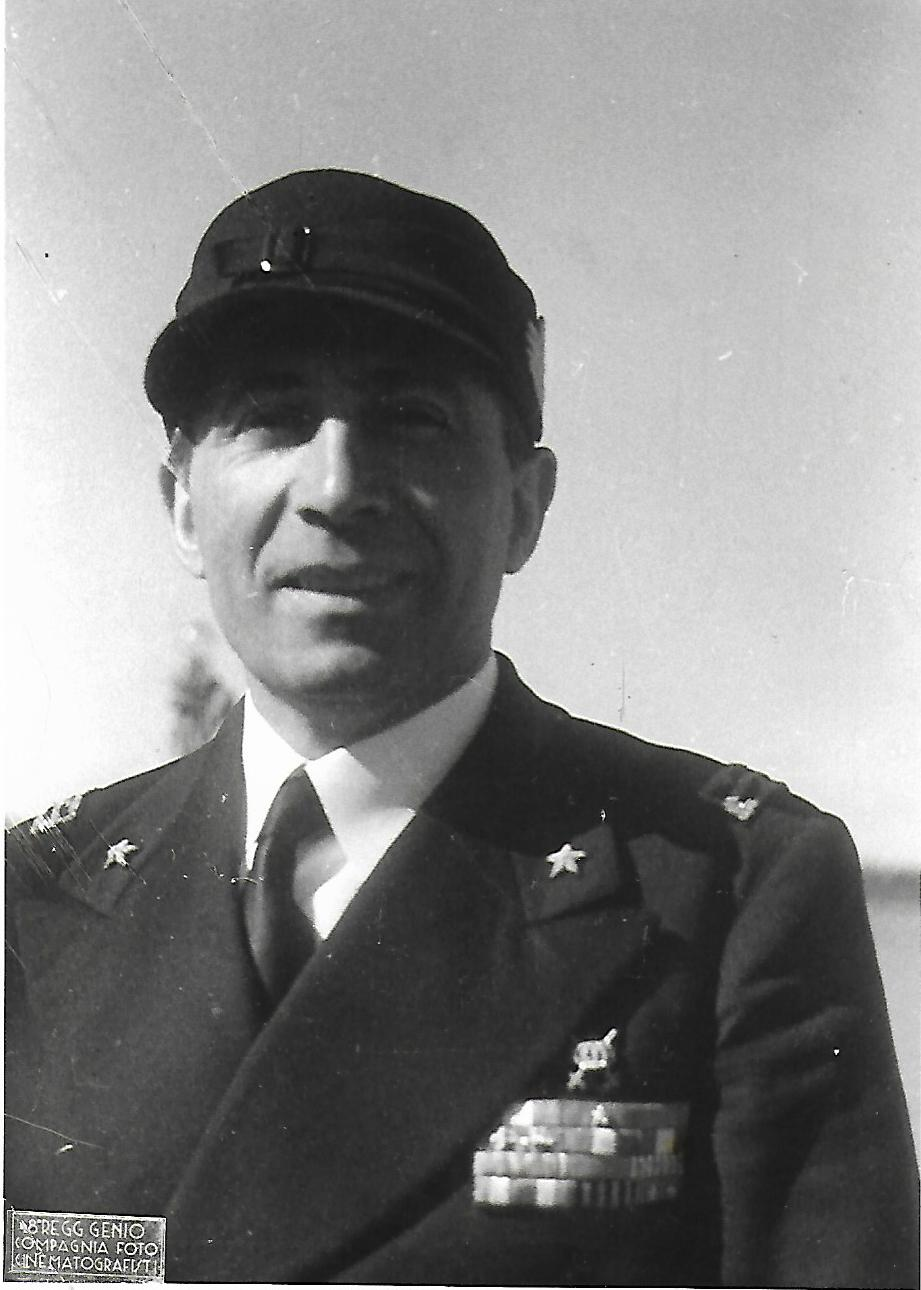
- Born: 29 July 1899; Vicenza, Kingdom of Italy
- Died: 16 March 1967 (aged 67); Rome, Italy
- Military career
- Allegiance: Kingdom of Italy; Italy
- Branch: Regia Marina; Italian Navy
- Service years: 1913-1954
- Rank: Rear Admiral
- Conflicts: World War I; Second Italo-Ethiopian War; World War II; North African campaign; Operation Agreement; Battle of the Mediterranean; Battle of Punta Stilo; Operation Corkscrew
- Awards: Silver Medal of Military Valor; Bronze Medal of Military Valor (twice); War Cross for Military Valor (twice); Iron Cross First Class

Orazio Bernardini (Vicenza, 29 July 1899 – Rome, 16 March 1967) was an Italian admiral.

== Biography ==
Born in Vicenza on 29 July 1899, he was admitted in 1913 to the Naval Academy of Livorno, graduating as ensign in 1917. After a period as a junior officer on capital ships during the First World War and promotion to sub-lieutenant, he attended the Aviation School of Taranto, obtaining the airplane observer license. In 1923, he was awarded a Silver Medal of Military Valor for having rescued a gravely wounded crewman following an ammunition explosion on the destroyer Angelo Bassini, being hospitalized for smoke inhalation. In the same year he was promoted to lieutenant and subsequently appointed executive officer on the destroyers Generale Antonio Cantore, Giacinto Carini and Generale Antonio Chinotto, and later commanding officer of the submarines H 6, N 1 and N 6 and of the torpedo boats 42 PN, 34 PN and 60 OL.

From 1930 to 1932 he held a shore assignment at the headquarters of the Taranto Naval Department, and after promotion to lieutenant commander he was given command of the destroyers Cortellazzo, Giovanni Nicotera and Bettino Ricasoli. During the Second Italo-Ethiopian War he commanded the naval base of Massawa, after which from 1936 to 1939, he was deputy commander of the Venice naval base. After promotion to commander, in January 1940 he was assigned to the General Directorate for Naval Armaments in Rome.

In July 1940, a month after Italy's entry into the Second World War, he was transferred to Benghazi as deputy chief of staff of the Naval Command of Libya. During the battle of Punta Stilo he volunteered for a bombing mission on British vessels; after his aircraft was hit by enemy fire and forced to ditch, his seafaring expertise proved decisive in helping the crew survive until rescued. After promotion to captain for war merit in 1941, in 1942 he was transferred to Tobruk as commander of the Gazala Naval Detachment and commander of a flotilla of MZ motor barges, helping repel the British attack during Operation Agreement, for which he was awarded the Iron Cross First Class with Swords by the German authorities, and the Bronze Medal of Military Valor by the Italian authorities. Overall, during his service in North Africa he was awarded two bronze medals and two war crosses for military valor.

He was then repatriated and assigned to the Ministry of the Navy in Rome, at the Naval Armaments Directorate, planning the transfer of the XII Squadriglia MAS to Lake Ladoga. In December 1942 he was appointed commander of the garrison of Lampedusa, consisting of 4,400 men. On 13 June 1943, after a week of heavy Allied aerial and naval bombardment and the fall of nearby Pantelleria, Bernardini surrendered the island to the British, after which he was sento to Wilton Park as a prisoner of war. He was released in 1944, following the armistice of Cassibile, and given command of the battleship Giulio Cesare in 1945.

After the war he was head of the Italian Navy's sailing sports office from 1949 to 1954; in this capacity he secretly used motorboat races to covertly continue the training of assault craft operators, which had been prohibited by the 1947 peace treaty. In late 1954 he retired from active service with the rank of rear admiral. He died in 1967.
