= Lampedusa e Linosa =

Lampedusa e Linosa Lampidusa e Linusa (Sicilian)
- Comune
- Comune di Lampedusa e Linosa
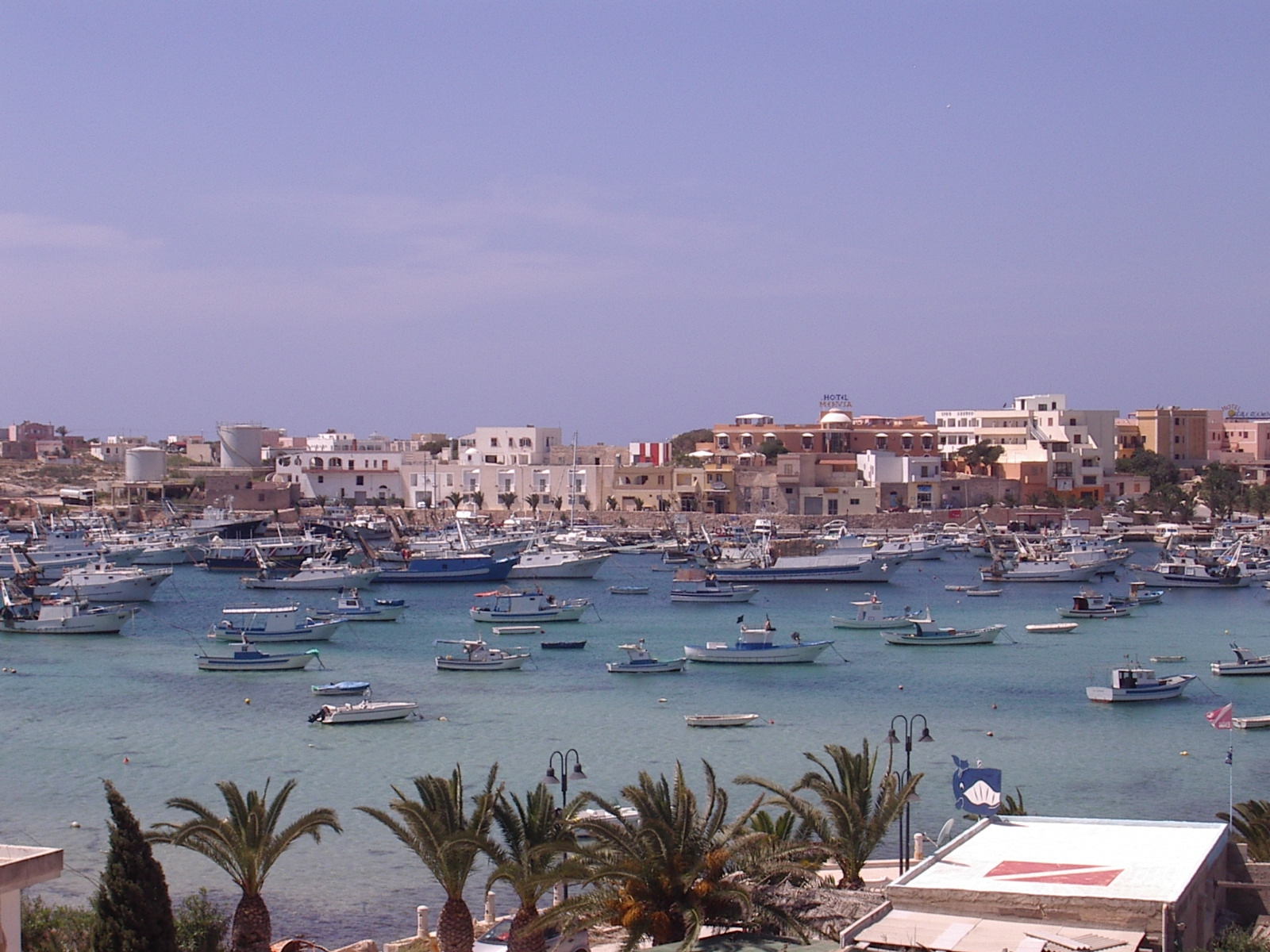
- View of the town of Lampedusa from the harbor

- Flag Coat of arms

- Location within Italy Location within Sicily
- Coordinates: 35°30′N 12°36′E
- Country: Italy
- Region: Sicily
- Province: Agrigento (AG)
- Frazioni: Cala Creta, Cala Francese, Grecale, Terranova

Government
  - Mayor: Filippo Mannino

Area
  - Total: 25.22 km^{2} (9.74 sq mi)
- Elevation: 16 m (52 ft)

Population (2026)
  - Total: 6,485
  - Density: 257.1/km^{2} (666.0/sq mi)
- Demonym(s): Lampedusano(i), Linosano(i)
- Time zone: UTC+1 (CET)
  - Summer (DST): UTC+2 (CEST)
- Postal code: 92010
- Dialing code: 0922
- Patron saint: Madonna of Porto Salvo
- Saint day: September 22
- Website: Official website

Lampedusa e Linosa (Sicilian: Lampidusa e Linusa) is a comune (municipality) in the Province of Agrigento in the autonomous island region of Sicily in southern Italy. Located about 220 km (137 miles) southwest of Agrigento and about 260 km (162 miles) southeast of Tunis, it is the southernmost municipality of Italy. It includes the islands of Lampedusa, Linosa and Lampione, collectively known as the Pelagian Islands. It has 6,485 inhabitants.

== History ==
The comune of Lampedusa e Linosa was founded on 12 June 1878.

== Geography ==
The municipality of Lampedusa e Linosa includes the isles of Lampedusa, Linosa and Lampione, collectively known as the Pelagian Islands.

Geographically part of Africa, it is the southernmost municipality of Italy.

== Demographics ==
As of 2026, the population is 6,485, of which 52.3% are male, and 47.7% are female. Minors make up 15.5% of the population, and seniors make up 20.3%.

Historical population

Year	Pop.	±%
1861	998	—
1871	1,114	+11.6%
1881	1,148	+3.1%
1901	2,204	+92.0%
1911	2,454	+11.3%
1921	2,624	+6.9%
1931	2,948	+12.3%
1936	3,482	+18.1%

Year	Pop.	±%
1951	4,458	+28.0%
1961	4,811	+7.9%
1971	4,383	−8.9%
1981	4,790	+9.3%
1991	5,624	+17.4%
2001	5,725	+1.8%
2011	6,105	+6.6%
2021	6,462	+5.8%

Source: ISTAT

=== Immigration ===
As of 2025, immigrants make up 5.3% of the population. The 5 largest foreign countries of birth are Romania, Tunisia, Germany, Honduras, and Pakistan.

== Government ==
Lampedusa e Linosa is headed by a mayor (sindaco) assisted by a legislative body, the consiglio comunale, and an executive body, the giunta comunale. Since 1995 the mayor and members of the consiglio comunale are directly elected together by resident citizens, while from 1945 to 1995 the mayor was chosen by the legislative body. The giunta comunale is chaired by the mayor, who appoints others members, called assessori. The offices of the comune are housed in a building usually called the municipio or palazzo comunale.

Since 1993, the mayor of Lampedusa e Linosa is directly elected by citizens, originally every four, then every five years. The current mayor is Filippo Mannino, elected on 13 June 2022.

Mayor	Term start	Term end	Party
Salvatore Martello	23 November 1993	28 May 2002	PDS
Sebastiano Siragusa	28 May 2002	15 May 2007	FI
Bernardino De Rubeis	15 May 2007	8 May 2012	MpA
Giuseppina Nicolini	8 May 2012	12 June 2017	PD
Salvatore Martello	12 June 2017	13 June 2022	PD
Filippo Mannino	13 June 2022	Incumbent	Ind

== Main sights ==
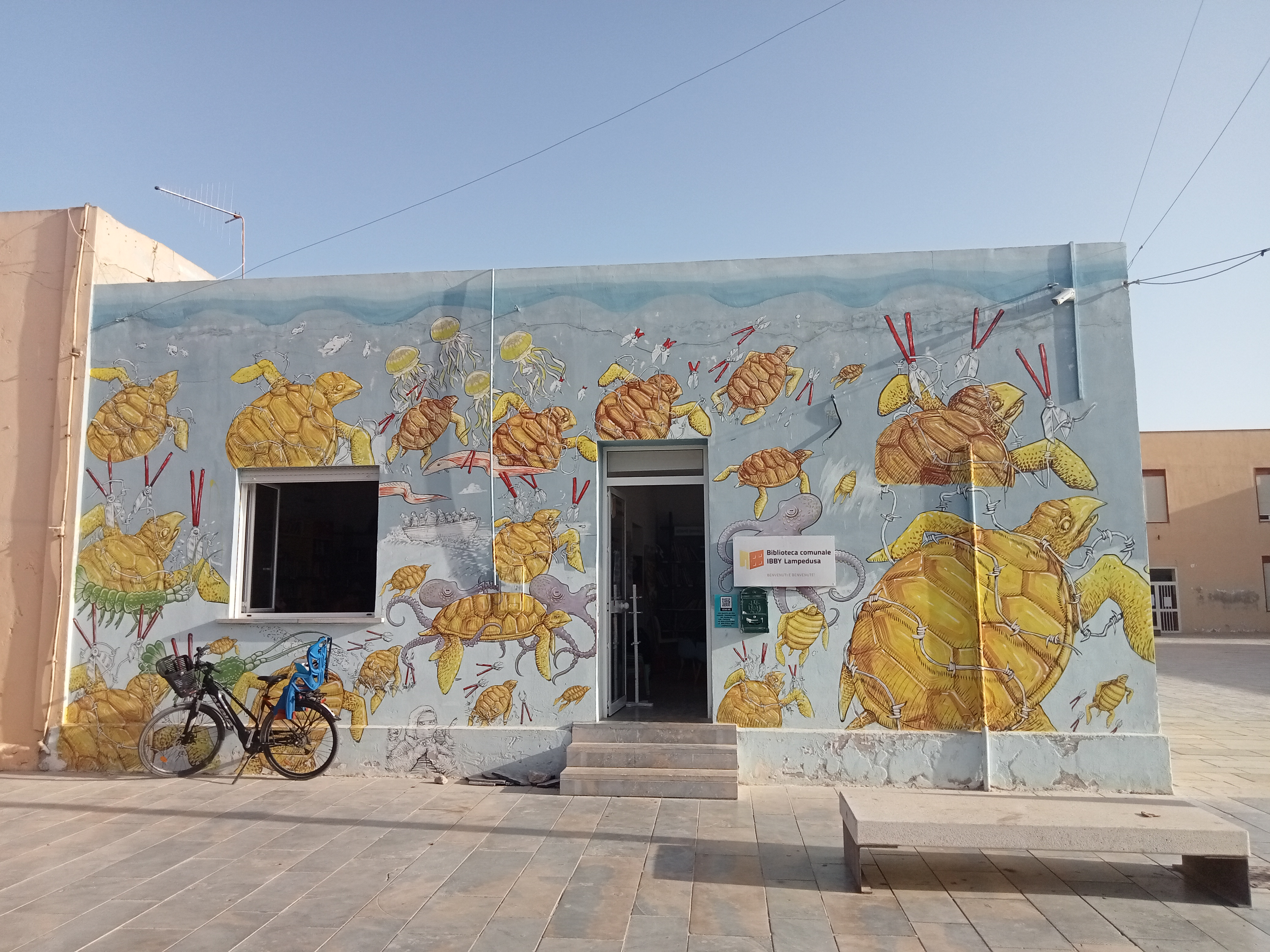
Public Library

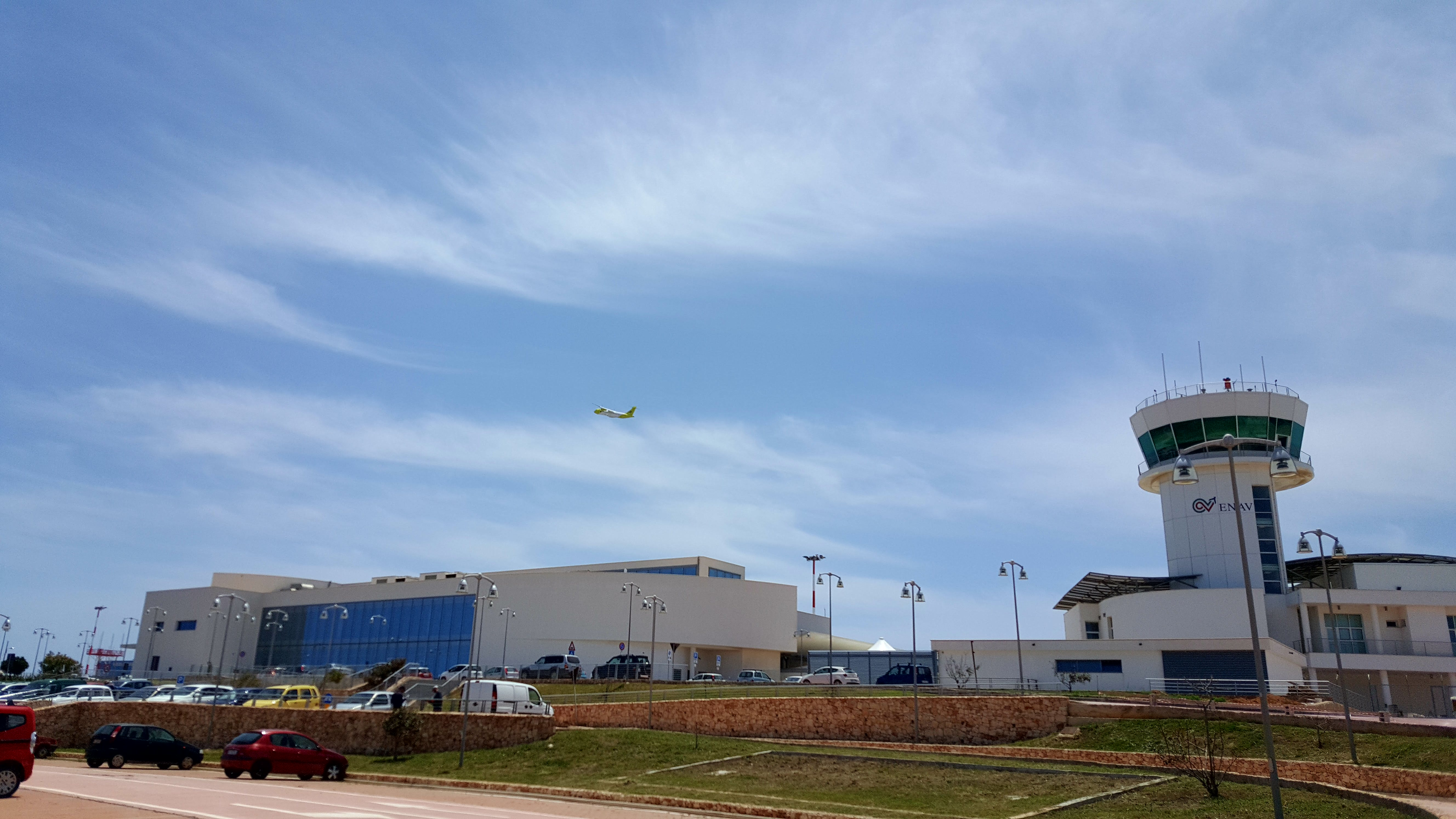
Airport

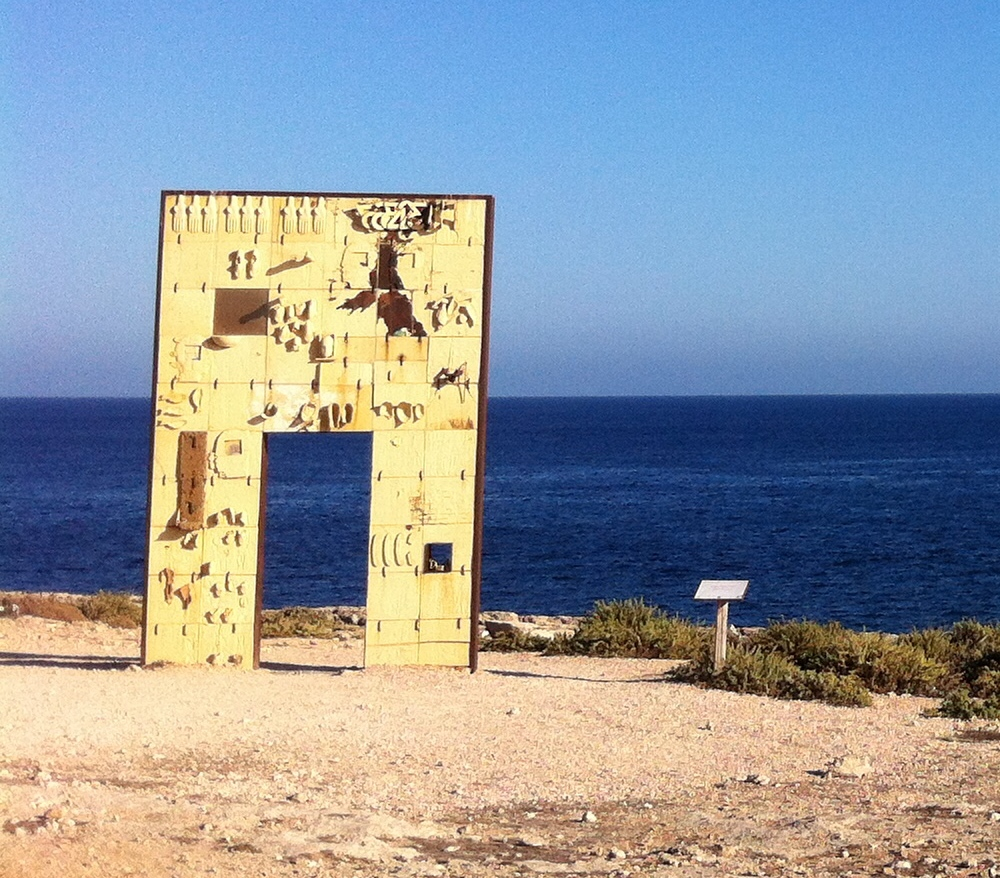
Door of Europe

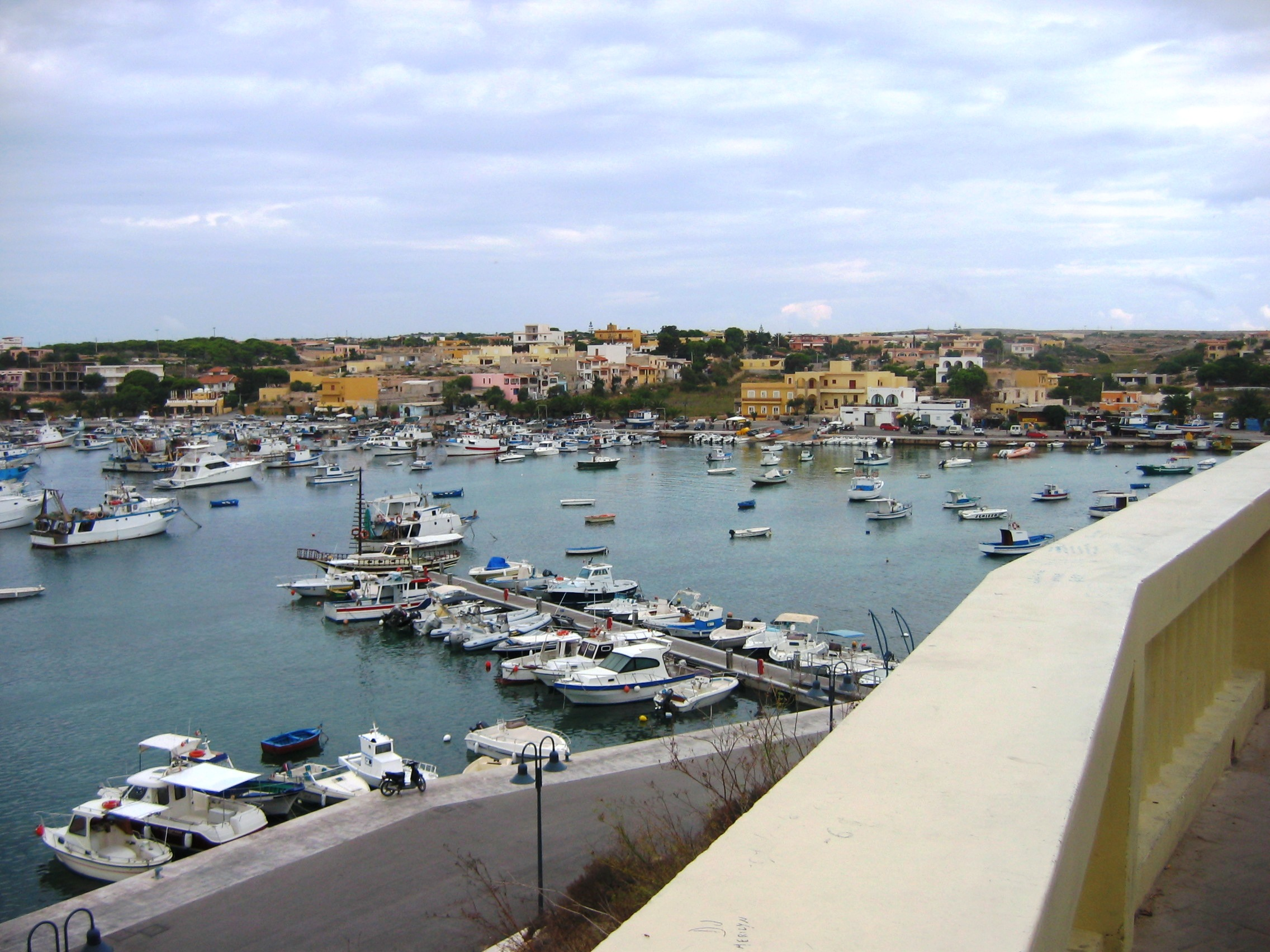
Old harbor

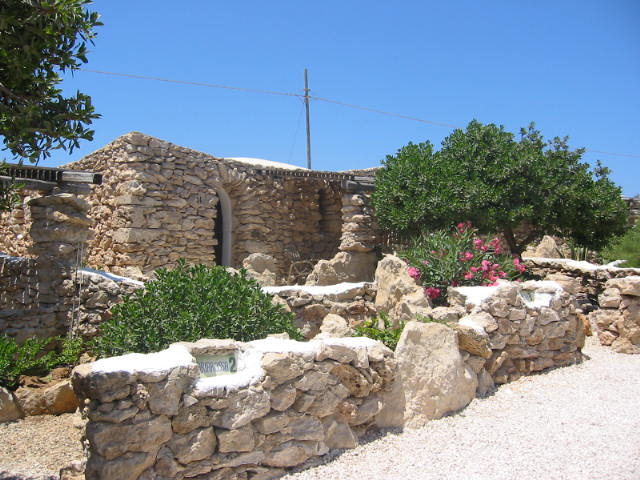
Typical dammuso

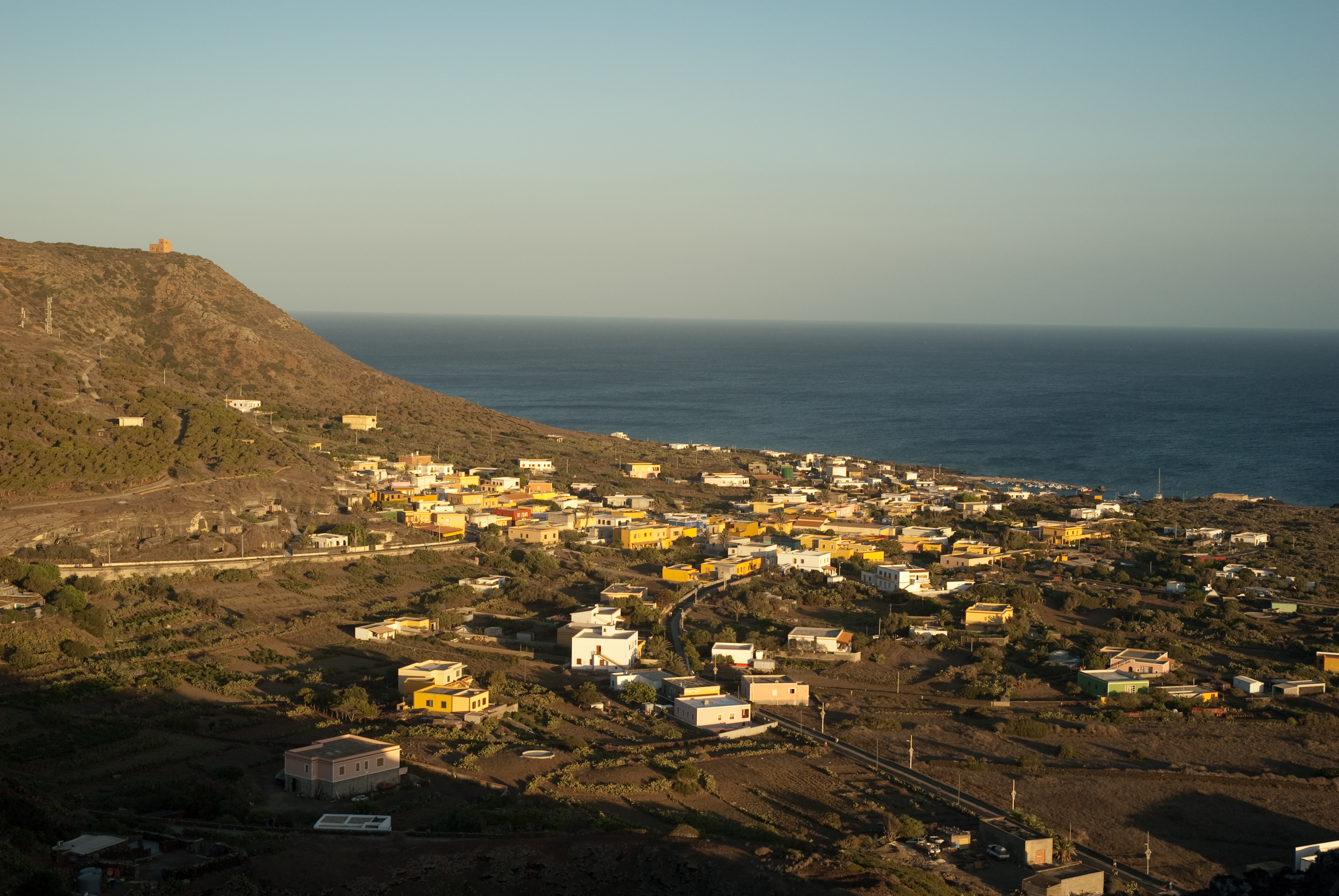
Linosa

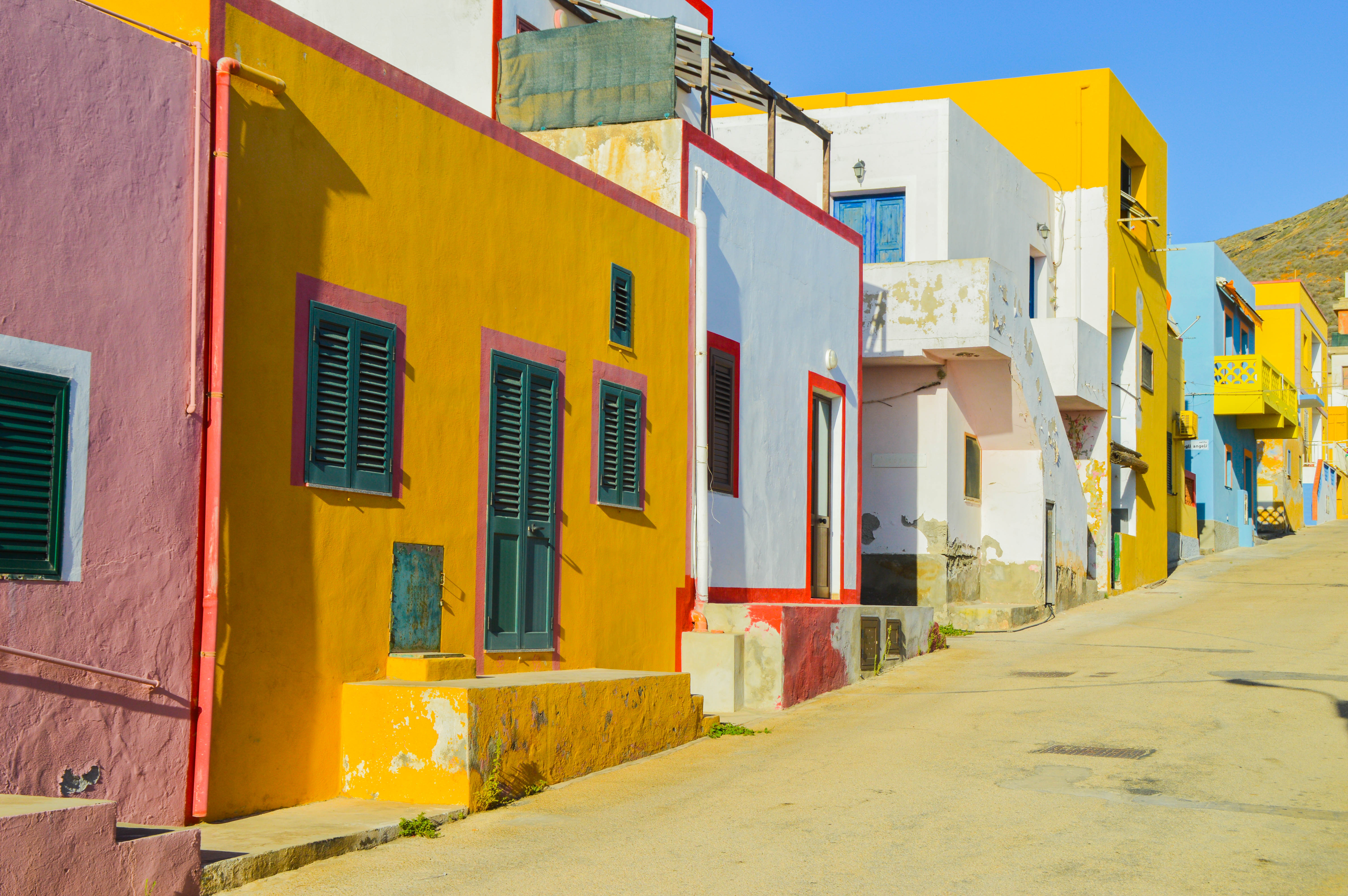
Houses in Linosa

== International relations ==
=== Twin towns – Sister cities ===
Lampedusa e Linosa is twinned with:

- Bassano del Grappa, Italy
- Weʽa, Djibouti
