= Lampedusa =

Italian island in the Mediterranean Sea

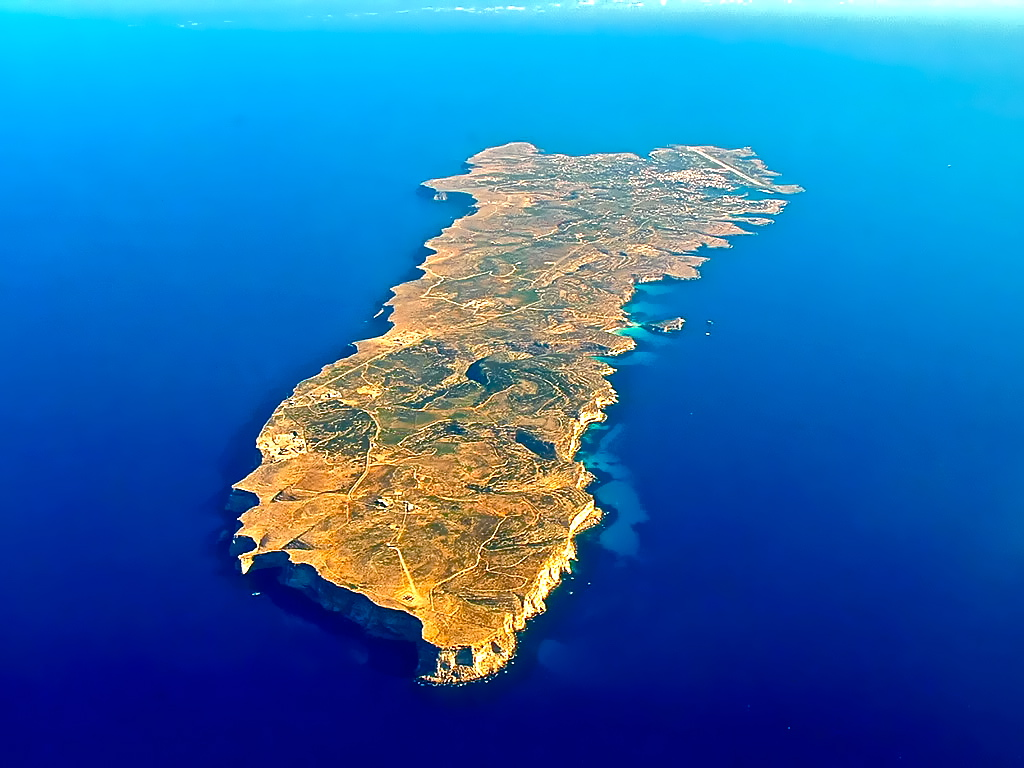
- Aerial view of Lampedusa

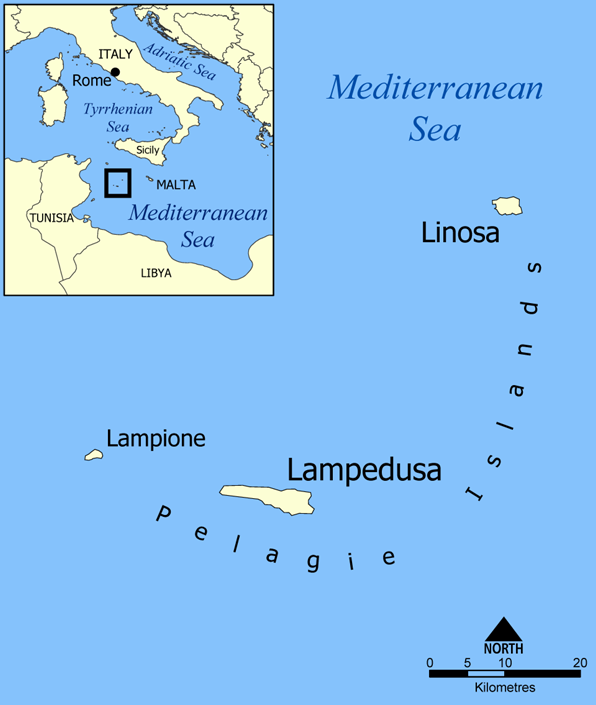

- Location within Sicily Location within Italy

Geography
- Location: Mediterranean Sea
- Coordinates: 35°30′54″N 12°34′48″E
- Archipelago: Pelagian Islands
- Area: 20.2 km^{2} (7.8 sq mi)

Administration
- Italy
- Region: Sicily
- Province: Agrigento
- Comune: Lampedusa e Linosa

Demographics
- Population: 6,462 (entire Lampedusa e Linosa Comune) (2021)

Lampedusa (/ˌlæmpɪˈdjuːzə/ LAM-pih-DEW-zə, US also /-sə/ -sə, Italian: [lampeˈduːza]; Sicilian: Lampidusa [lambɪˈɾuːsa]; Maltese: Lampeduża) (Note: Ancient Greek: Λοπαδοῦσσα, romanized: Lopadoûssa, also Λοπαδοῦσα, Lopadoûsa, or Λοπαδυῦσσα, Lopadyŷssa.) is the largest of Italy's Pelagian Islands in the Mediterranean Sea.

The comune of Lampedusa e Linosa is part of the Sicilian province of Agrigento which also includes the smaller islands of Linosa and Lampione. It is the southernmost part of Italy. Tunisia, which is 113 kilometres (61 nautical miles) away, is the closest landfall to the islands. Sicily is farther at 205 kilometres (110 1/2 nautical miles), while Malta is 176 kilometres (95 nautical miles) east of Lampedusa.

Lampedusa has an area of 20.2 km^{2} (7 13/16 sq mi) and a population of about 6,000 people. Its main industries are fishing, agriculture, and tourism. A ferry service links the island with Porto Empedocle, near Agrigento, Sicily. There are also year-round flights from Lampedusa Airport to Palermo and Catania on the Sicilian mainland. In the summer, there are additional services to Rome and Milan, besides many other seasonal links with the Italian mainland.

In 2013, Spiaggia dei Conigli ("Rabbit Beach"), located in the southern part of the island, was voted the world's best beach by travel site TripAdvisor.

Since the early 2000s, the island has become a primary European entry point for migrants, mainly coming from Libya and Tunisia. This is commemorated by a monument on the island: Porta d'Europa.

In 2021, the island received the Jan Karski Eagle Award, as the first and only time that the award was given out three times in a year.

== Etymology ==
The name Lampedusa derives from the ancient Greek name of the island, Λοπαδούσσα (Lopadoússa) or Λαπαδούσσα (Lapadoússa). It has been suggested that the name derives from the word λέπας (lépas), which means 'rock', due to the rocky landscape of the island; another story is that this word was also used by the Greeks for a kind of oyster and the island was called that, due to the abundance of this kind of oyster. Other scholars believe that the name derives from λαμπάς (lampás), which means 'torch', because of the lights which were placed on the island for sailors. Periplus of Pseudo-Scylax called the island Λαμπάς (Lampas).

== History ==
=== Prior to 1800 ===
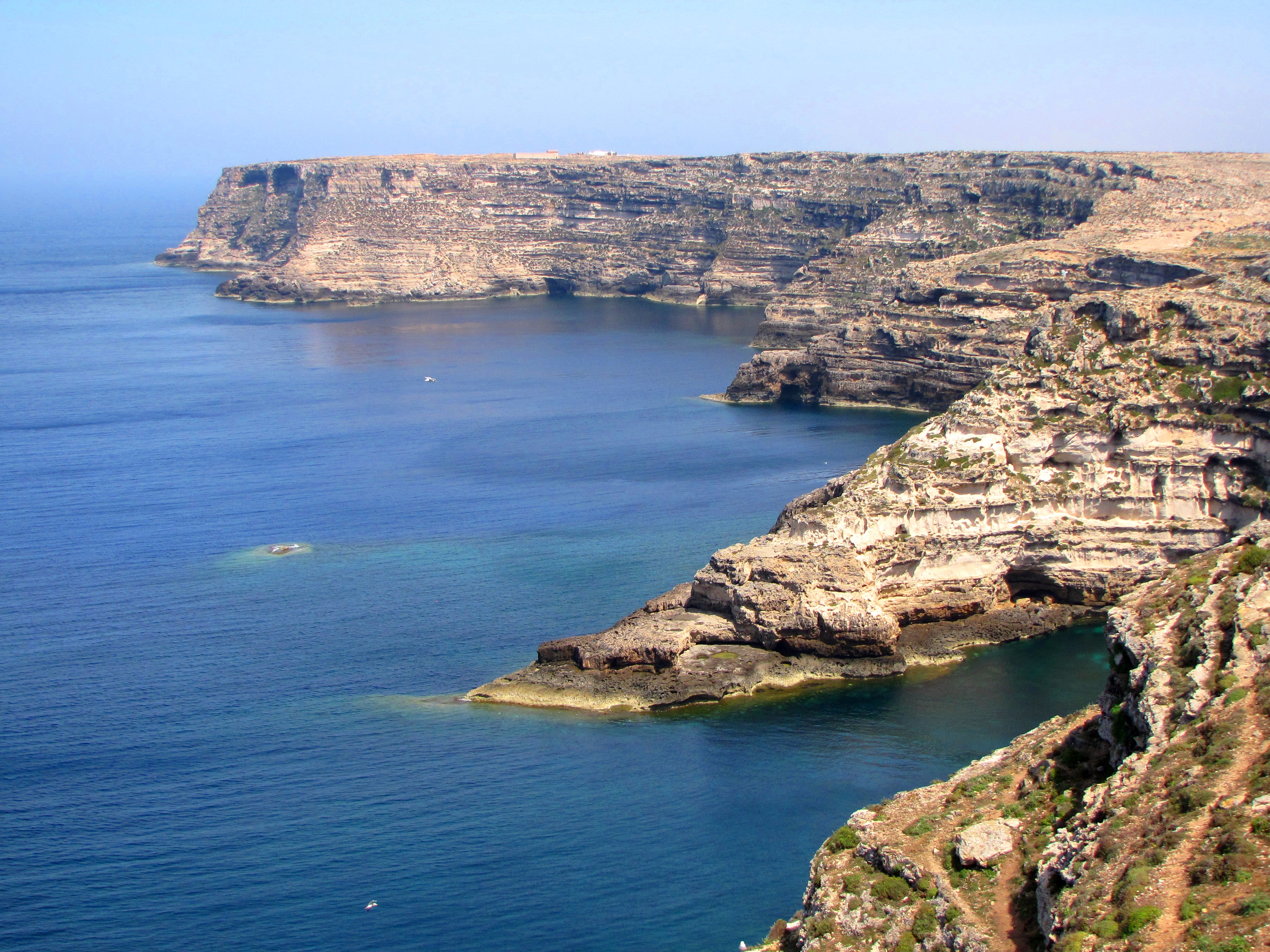
Northeastern cliffs of Lampedusa

Historically, Lampedusa was a landing place and a maritime base for the ancient Phoenicians, Greeks and Romans. The 4th-century BC Greek manuscript, the Periplus of Pseudo-Scylax, mentions that there were two or three towers on the island. The Romans established a plant for the production of the prized fish sauce known as garum. In 812 (or 813), directed by the Aghlabids, the island was sacked by Saracens during the Arab–Byzantine wars.

By the end of the medieval period, the island had become a dependency of the Kingdom of Sicily. In 1553, Barbary pirates from North Africa under the command of the Ottoman Empire raided Lampedusa and carried off 1,000 captives into slavery. As a result of pirate attacks, the island became uninhabited. In 1565, Don García de Toledo made a brief stop at Lampedusa while leading a relief force to break the Great Siege of Malta. In subsequent centuries, the Hospitaller fleet which was based in Malta sometimes used Lampedusa's harbour as a shelter from bad weather or from corsairs.

In 1667, the island was given to Ferdinand Tomasi of Palermo, who acquired the title of Prince of Lampedusa from King Charles II of Spain. Tomasi was the ancestor of the writer Giuseppe Tomasi di Lampedusa. A century after acquiring the island, the Tomasi family began a program of resettlement.

In the late 18th century, the Order of St. John maintained a small establishment on Lampedusa, which included a chapel dedicated to the Virgin Mary. This was manned by a priest and six Maltese men, who often traded with pirates. A structure known as marabuto, probably a mausoleum commemorating a member of the Marabouts, also existed on the island at this time, and it was visited by many Muslim devotees.

=== 19th century ===
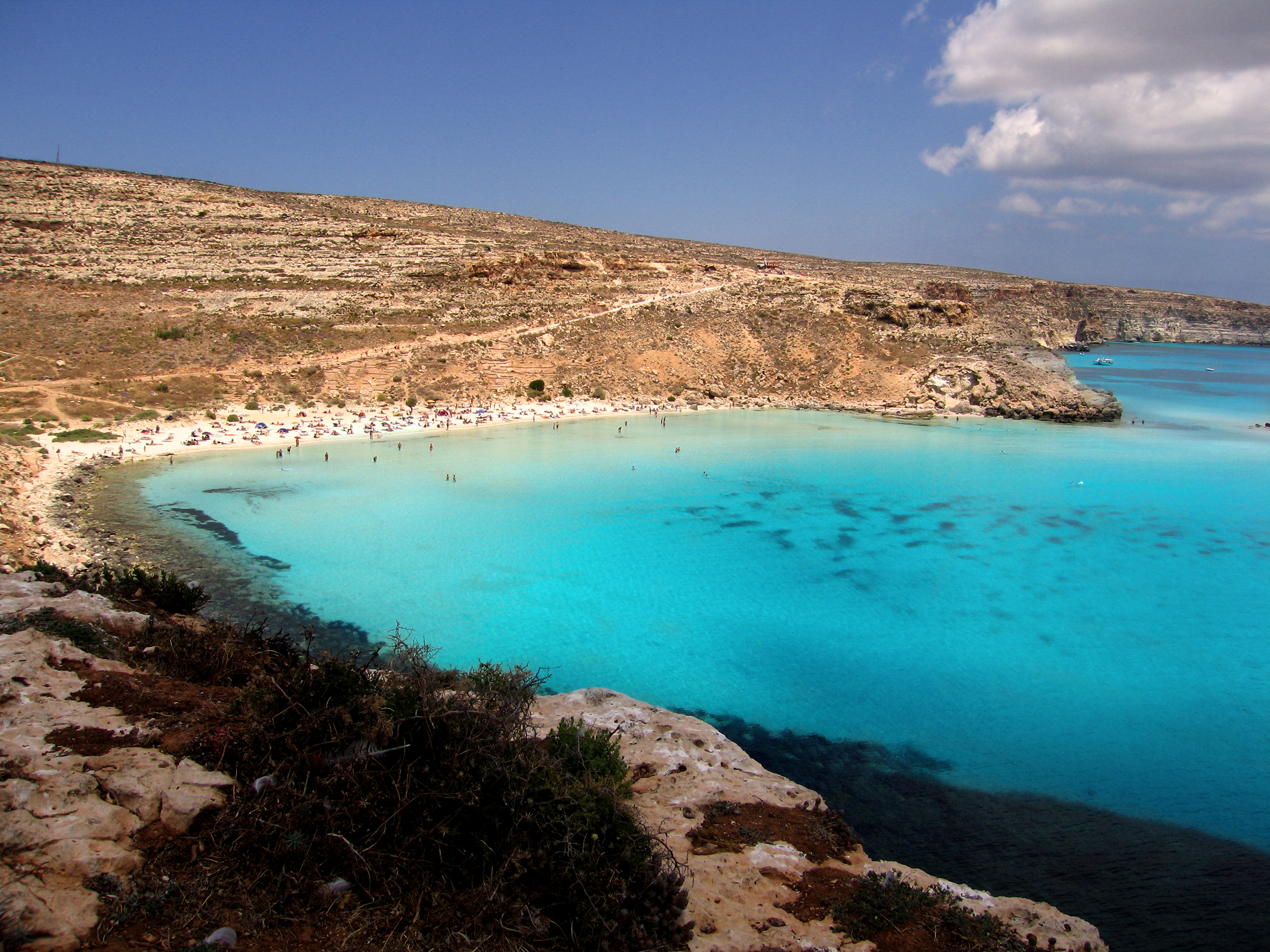
Rabbit Beach in the southern part of the island

On 25 June 1800, Don Giulio III Maria Tomasi, 6th Prince of Lampedusa (1743–1812), leased Lampedusa in perpetual emphyteusis to Salvatore Gatt, a Maltese merchant, on the condition that the latter would build two coastal watchtowers at Cala della Galere and Cala della Madonna. Gatt settled the island with some Maltese workers, and he imported livestock and began cultivating the land. The old castle was reconstructed, and a windmill was also built. Gatt hoisted the British flag for protection. On 27 June 1804, the prince conceded the island to Giuseppe Bugeja, another Maltese, although Gatt remained in control of the island.

At the time, the British were considering taking over Lampedusa, possibly as an alternative to Malta, which had just become a British protectorate. In 1803, the Royal Navy dropped the idea since the island's small harbour was not comparable to Malta's larger and well-fortified Grand Harbour. However, reports stated that the island could be useful in supplying Malta, especially with the threat of Sicily falling to the French.

In 1810, Gatt leased the island to Alexander Fernandez of the Army Commissariat in the Mediterranean, who established a farm with cattle and sheep, and employed 28 workers to turn the island's surface into pasturage. A small detachment of 26 men of the 14th Regiment were sent to the island in 1811 to support Fernandez, who was planning to build a fort on the island. By 1813, the island had a population of almost 200 Maltese workers.

A royal commission stated in an 1812 report that there would be considerable difficulties in turning the island (together with Linosa and Pantelleria) into a supply base for Malta. The commission found Fernandez's situation to be very strange, and the treasury demanded an explanation of his conduct. In November 1813, the sloop HMS Partridge was infected with yellow fever, and was sent to Lampedusa until convalescence. This caused most of the population to flee back to Malta, leaving only 50 to 60 people on the island. The Governor of Malta, Sir Thomas Maitland, visited Lampedusa and found that Fernandez was running a business venture, so on 15 September 1814 he announced the withdrawal of British troops stationed on the island. The same notice also stated that "it is not the intention of [the British] Government to have any further concern or connection with [Lampedusa]". At this point, Greek privateers deposited provisions and took refuge at Lampedusa while being pursued by Tunisian vessels.

Fernandez had left for Gibraltar in 1813, but he continued to make claims on his title in Lampedusa. The British Government refused to compensate him in 1818, and Sicilian courts deprived him of his title soon afterwards. The Gatt family retook possession of the island, but what happened in subsequent years is unclear. Salvatore Gatt is believed to have died or disappeared sometime between 1813 and 1821, and the island was taken over by Fortunato Frendo, who had murdered Giacoma Gatt, Salvatore's wife. An official expedition was sent to the island from Naples in 1828, and the island was found to be inhabited by members of the Frendo, Gatt, and Molinos families along with a few workers.

A Neapolitan warship visited the island in 1841 as a show of force, but nothing changed until 11 September 1843, when two warships arrived and landed 400 soldiers on the island. They replaced the British flags on the island with Neapolitan flags. A royal decree was read out proclaiming the island as part of the Kingdom of the Two Sicilies. A few of the Maltese settlers remained on the island, while others returned to Malta or went to Tunisia.

In the 1840s, the Tomasi family formally sold the island to the Kingdom of Naples. In 1861, the island became part of the Kingdom of Italy, but the new Italian government limited its activities there to building a penal colony.

=== 20th century ===
During the Second World War, the island was Axis territory, held by a small Italian garrison. Despite its proximity to Allied-held Malta and North Africa, the island did not see any military engagements until June 1943 when, as a precursor to the Allied invasion of Sicily, the island was secured without resistance in Operation Corkscrew by the Royal Navy destroyer HMS Lookout and ninety-five men of the 2nd Battalion the Coldstream Guards. After a week of air raids and a naval bombardment by cruisers Aurora, Orion, Penelope and Newfoundland and six destroyers, white flags were sighted in the port, and when Lieutenant Corbett of Lookout approached the port in a motor launch, he was told that the island's garrison wished to surrender. Mussolini had given the garrison his permission to surrender because it lacked any water. The Governor's formal surrender was accepted in the island's underground command-post by a combined Army/Navy delegation sometime before 9:00 pm on 12 June 1943. During this process, the governor handed his sword to the Coldstream company commander, Major Bill Harris.

A second unofficial claim has also been made regarding the capitulation of the island, when earlier that same day elements of the garrison had also attempted to surrender in unusual circumstances when Sergeant Sydney Cohen, the pilot of a Royal Air Force Fairey Swordfish aircraft landed having run low on fuel and suffering problems with his compass. Cohen's exploits were commemorated in a Yiddish play The King of Lampedusa that ran for six months.

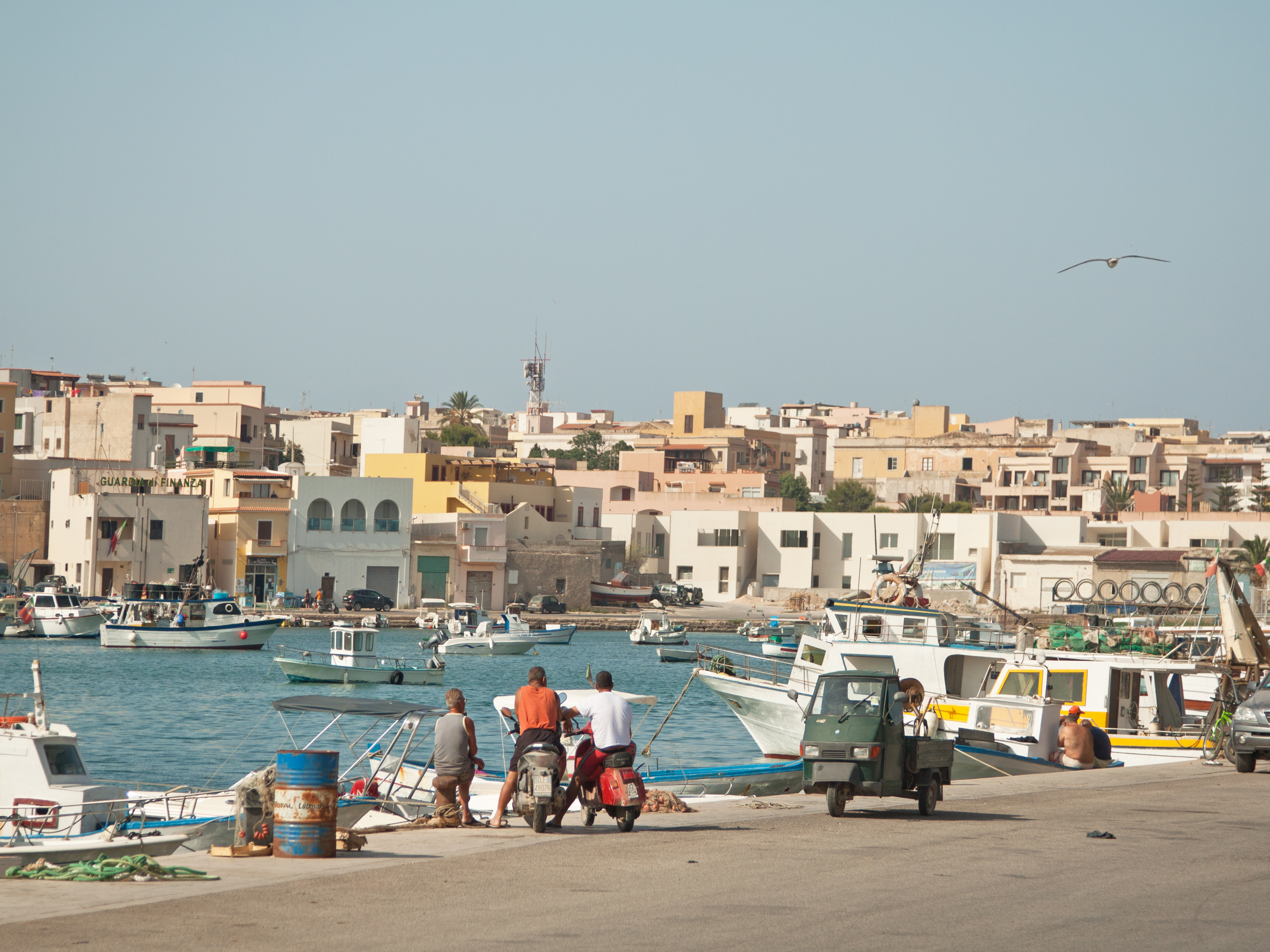
View of the town of Lampedusa

The first telephone connection with Sicily was installed only in the 1960s. In the same decade an electric power station was built.

In 1972, part of the western side of the island became a United States Coast Guard LORAN-C transmitter station. In 1979, Lt. Kay Hartzell took command of the Coast Guard base, becoming "the first female commanding officer of an isolated duty station".

The 1980s, and especially 1985–1986, saw an increase in tensions and the area around the island was the scene of multiple attacks. On 15 April 1986, Libya fired two Scuds at the Lampedusa navigation station, in retaliation for the American bombing of Tripoli and Benghazi, and the alleged death of Colonel Gaddafi's adopted daughter. However, the missiles passed over the island, landed in the sea, and caused no damage.

On 4 January 1989, U.S. Navy aircraft from the carrier USS John F. Kennedy shot down two Libyan fighters approximately 200 km (110 nmi) from the island.

The NATO base was decommissioned in 1994 and transferred to Italian military control.

=== 21st century and North African immigration ===
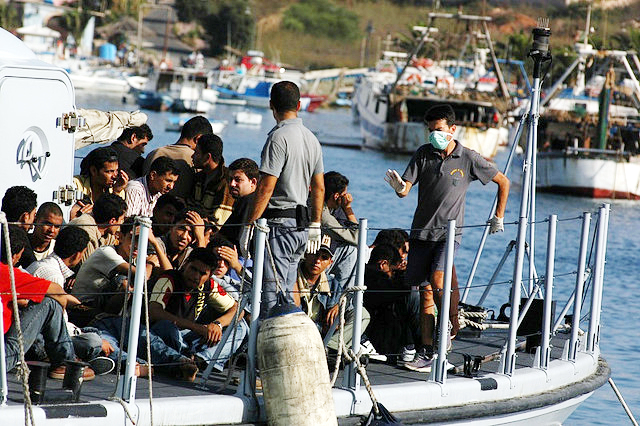
Migrants arriving on the Island of Lampedusa in August 2007

Since the early 2000s, Lampedusa, the European territory closest to Libya, has become a prime transit point for migrants from Africa, the Middle East and Asia wanting to enter Europe. In 2004 the Libyan and Italian governments reached a secret agreement that obliged Libya to accept African immigrants deported from Italian territories. This resulted in the mass repatriation of many people from Lampedusa to Libya between 2004 and 2005, a move criticised by the European Parliament.

By 2006, many African immigrants were paying people smugglers in Libya to help get them to Lampedusa by boat. On arrival, most were then transferred by the Italian government to reception centres in mainland Italy. Many were then released because their deportation orders were not enforced.

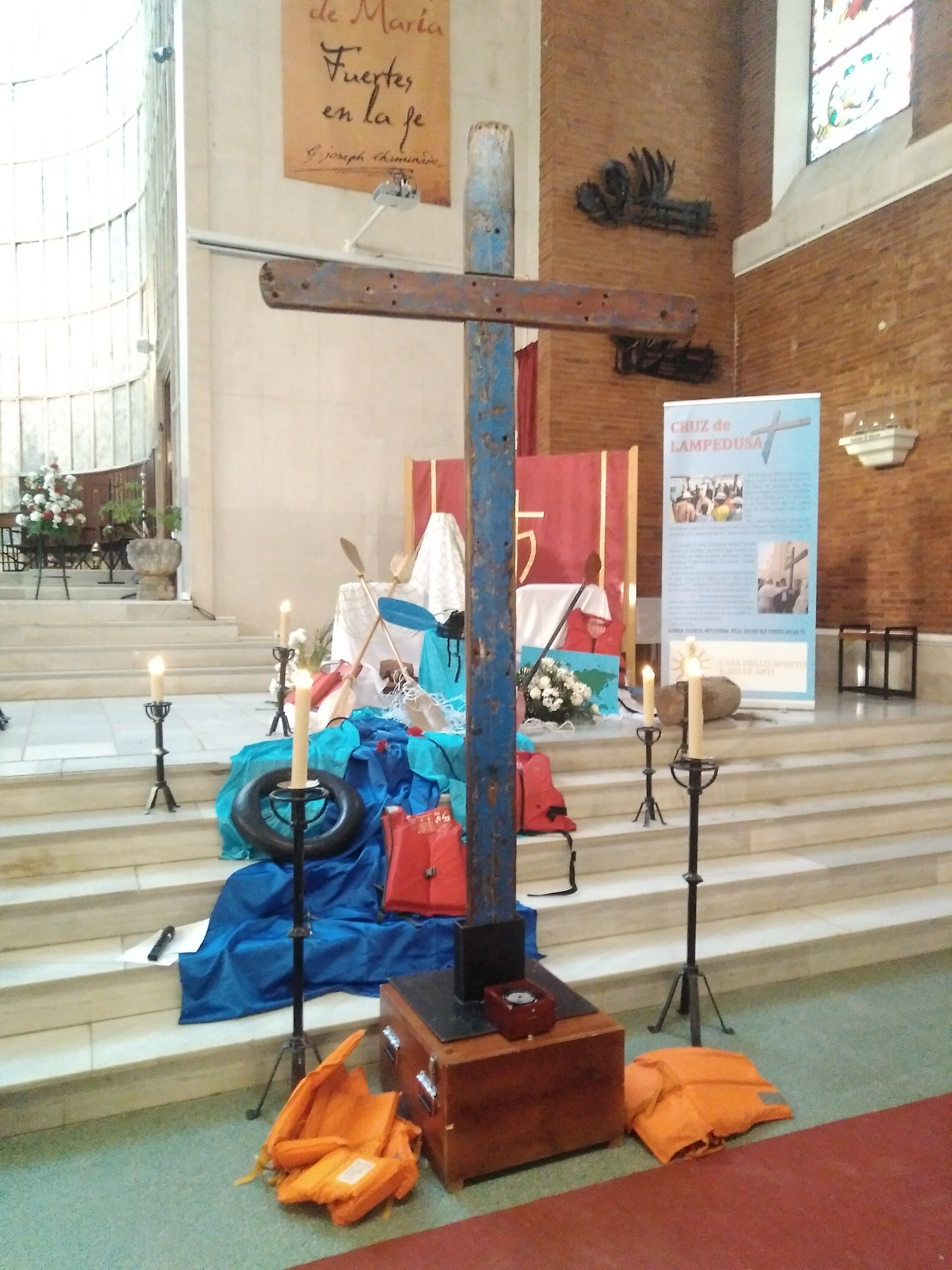
Cross made with wood of broken immigration boats—thousands of migrants have died trying to cross the Sahara and the Mediterranean on their way to Europe

In 2009, the overcrowded conditions at the island's temporary immigrant reception centre came under criticism by the United Nations High Commissioner for Refugees (UNHCR). The unit, which was originally built for a maximum capacity of 850 people, was reported to be housing nearly 2,000 boat people. A significant number of people were sleeping outdoors under plastic sheeting. A fire that started during an inmate riot destroyed a large portion of the holding facility on 19 February 2009.

In 2011, many more immigrants moved to Lampedusa during the rebellions in Tunisia and Libya. By May 2011, more than 35,000 immigrants had arrived on the island from Tunisia and Libya. By the end of August, 48,000 had arrived. Most were young males in their 20s and 30s. The situation has caused division within the EU, the French government regarding most of the arrivals as economic migrants rather than refugees in fear of persecution.

In July 2013, Pope Francis visited the island on his first official visit outside of Rome. He prayed for migrants, living and dead, and denounced their traffickers. In October 2013, the 2013 Lampedusa disaster occurred; a boat carrying more than 500 migrants, mostly from Eritrea and Somalia, sank off the coast of Lampedusa with the deaths of at least 300 people.

From January to April 2015, about 1,600 migrants died on the route from Libya to Lampedusa, making it the deadliest migrant route in the world.

The 2017 Oscar-nominated Italian documentary film Fire at Sea documented a part of this migrant crisis and was filmed entirely on the island in 2014 and 2015. The film also won the Golden Bear at the 66th Berlin Film Festival.

In September 2023, more than 120 boats, carrying roughly 7,000 migrants—more than the total population of Lampedusa—arrived on the island within the span of 24 hours. Some of the migrants were relocated to Germany. According to the Irish Examiner, the majority of the September 2023 migrants arrived from Tunisia and were "young men or unaccompanied minors." Reasons for migration varied, but the Irish Examiner listed a worsening of the "socioeconomic situation in Tunisia" and fleeing danger or persecution.

The year 2024 brought a total of 45,997 migrants to Lampedusa on 1,095 different boats. 43,580 people have arrived in Italy since the beginning of 2025.

== Geography ==
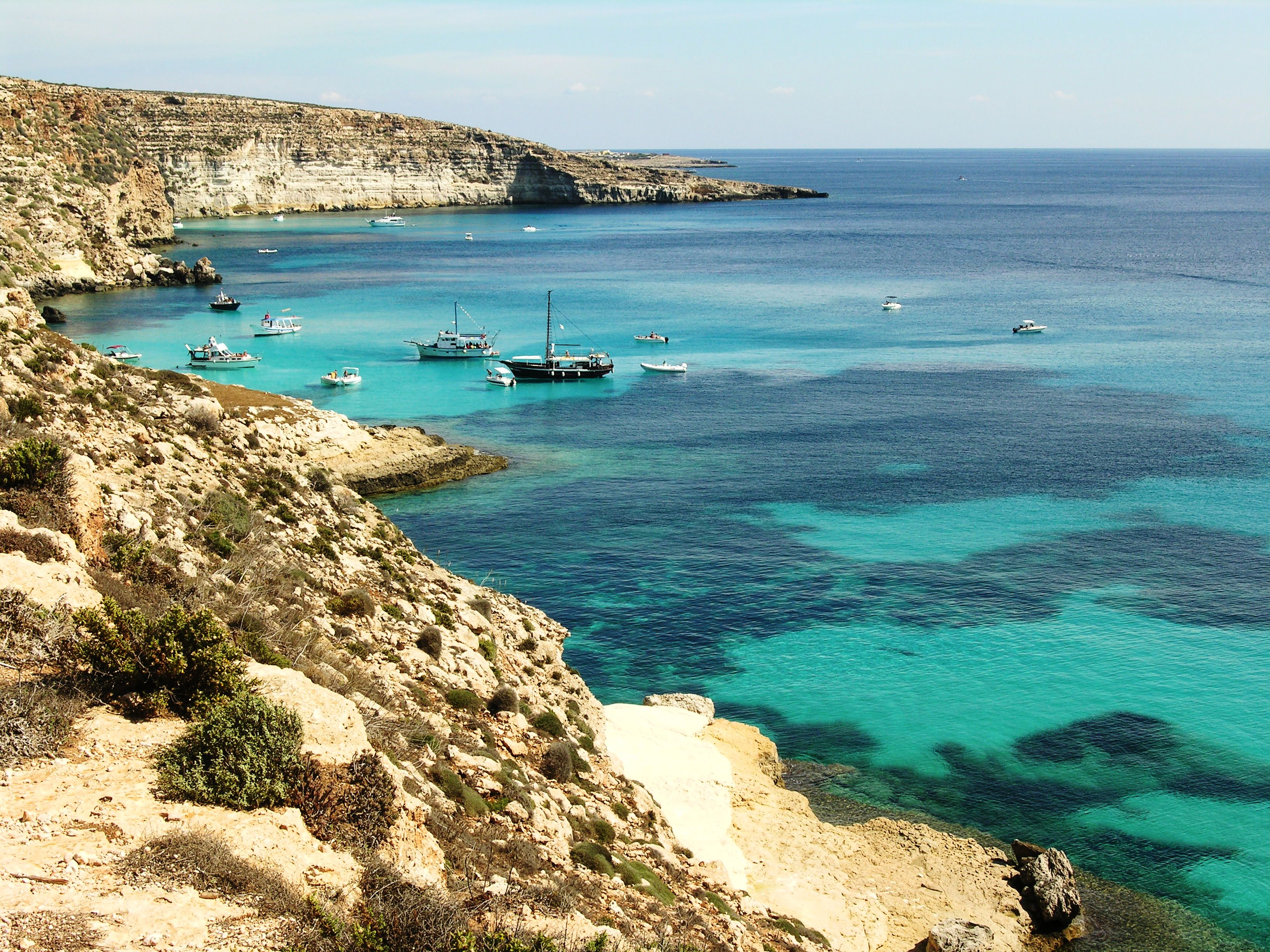
Coast of Lampedusa

Lampedusa is the southernmost point of Italy. Politically and administratively, Lampedusa is part of Italy, but geologically it is part of Africa since the sea between the two is no deeper than 120 m (390 ft). Lampedusa is a semi-arid island, dominated by a garrigue landscape, with maquis shrubland in the west. It has no sources of water other than irregular rainfall. Overall the island has two slopes, from west to east, and from north to south of the island. The south-western side is dominated by deep gorges, while the southeastern part is dominated by shallow valleys and sandy beaches. The entire northern coast is dominated by cliffs: gently sloping cliffs on the east coast, and vertical sheer cliffs on the west coast.

=== Geology ===
Lampedusa geologically is part of the "Pelagian Province" (USGS definition), a structural member of the African continent, lying on a structural high called the Lampedusa Plateau. Lampedusa essentially is a tilted block of limestone, the highest point being on the NW coast and the lowest on the SE coast, the island being soft limestone, of a white to creamy-yellow. This area lies on a seismically active part of central Mediterranean, the Sicily Channel Rift Zone. From a structural point of view, Lampedusa belongs to the Pelagian Block, a foreland at the northern edge of the African Plate, and is inside the Sicily Channel.

=== Climate ===
Lampedusa has a subtropical semi-arid climate (Köppen: BSh) characterized by hot, rainless and humid summers, warm winters, a powerful seasonal lag and a small diurnal temperature range. The constant sea breezes moderate the daytime summer temperatures. Lampedusa has the warmest winters in Europe, as well as the sunniest climate year-round. Along with coastal Pantelleria, Kasos, Karpathos, Kastellorizo and coastal Malta, it is one of the very few areas which have never recorded frost. The lowest temperature ever recorded in Lampedusa was 4.0 °C (39 °F) on 1 February 1999.

Climate data for Lampedusa 16 m. asl, 1991–2020 normals, extremes 1959–present
Month	Jan	Feb	Mar	Apr	May	Jun	Jul	Aug	Sep	Oct	Nov	Dec	Year
Record high °C (°F)	30.6 (87.1)	30.4 (86.7)	33.0 (91.4)	35.9 (96.6)	36.6 (97.9)	39.7 (103.5)	40.4 (104.7)	41.8 (107.2)	38.7 (101.7)	36.9 (98.4)	33.6 (92.5)	31.0 (87.8)	41.8 (107.2)
Mean daily maximum °C (°F)	20.3 (68.5)	20.6 (69.1)	21.0 (69.8)	22.1 (71.8)	23.4 (74.1)	26.8 (80.2)	29.7 (85.5)	30.4 (86.7)	29.0 (84.2)	27.1 (80.8)	24.2 (75.6)	22.0 (71.6)	24.7 (76.5)
Daily mean °C (°F)	17.6 (63.7)	17.8 (64.0)	18.2 (64.8)	19.3 (66.7)	21.0 (69.8)	24.3 (75.7)	27.2 (81.0)	28.0 (82.4)	26.7 (80.1)	24.5 (76.1)	21.4 (70.5)	19.1 (66.4)	22.1 (71.8)
Mean daily minimum °C (°F)	14.9 (58.8)	15.0 (59.0)	15.4 (59.7)	16.5 (61.7)	18.6 (65.5)	21.8 (71.2)	24.7 (76.5)	25.6 (78.1)	24.3 (75.7)	21.8 (71.2)	18.5 (65.3)	16.2 (61.2)	19.4 (67.0)
Record low °C (°F)	4.8 (40.6)	4.0 (39.2)	4.4 (39.9)	7.4 (45.3)	11.0 (51.8)	14.1 (57.4)	17.9 (64.2)	18.5 (65.3)	16.3 (61.3)	10.7 (51.3)	8.6 (47.5)	5.4 (41.7)	4.0 (39.2)
Average precipitation mm (inches)	42.6 (1.68)	29.7 (1.17)	23.6 (0.93)	21.5 (0.85)	6.0 (0.24)	2.3 (0.09)	0.1 (0.00)	1.8 (0.07)	8.5 (0.33)	39.3 (1.55)	53.3 (2.10)	51.5 (2.03)	280.2 (11.04)
Average precipitation days (≥ 1.0 mm)	5.4	4.7	2.8	2.6	1.3	0.3	0.0	0.2	1.0	3.1	5.5	5.6	32.5
Average relative humidity (%)	78	76	78	76	78	78	78	78	77	77	74	77	77
Source: Servizio Meteorologico

== Wildlife ==
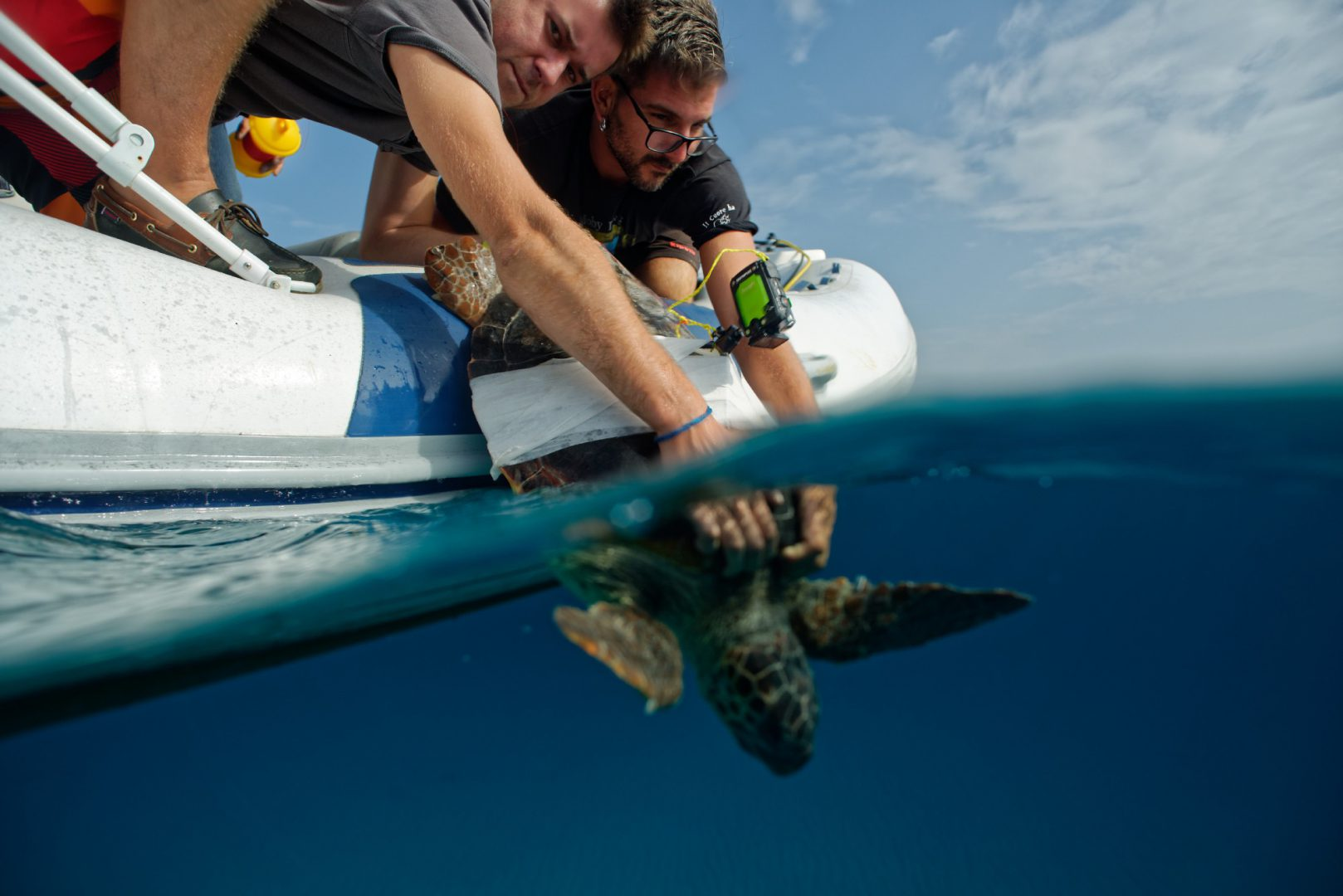
Sea turtle released into Lampedusa waters

The fauna and flora of Lampedusa are similar to those of North Africa, with a few pelagic endemic species. The Isola dei Conigli (literally "Rabbit Island"), close to the south coast of Lampedusa, is one of the last remaining egg-laying sites in Italy for the loggerhead sea turtle, which is endangered throughout the Mediterranean. The beach and the neighbouring island are part of a nature reserve: here the singer-songwriter Domenico Modugno spent his vacations, and died in 1994. Next to Parise Cape is a small beach accessible only by sea, through a low grotto. Other species living along the island's coast include mantas and smaller cetaceans such as dolphins and Risso's dolphins. Waters near Lampedusa are the only area in the Mediterranean with sightings of pregnant great white sharks and newly born individuals. Recent studies revealed that the waters of Lampedusa are a wintering feeding ground for the Mediterranean group of fin whales. Humpback whale, a species formerly considered as a vagrant species in the Mediterranean basin, has been seen around the island in recent years.

Along with Linosa, Lampedusa once was a stronghold for endangered Mediterranean monk seals until the 1950s, and they are likely to be currently extirpated from the island. However, monk seals were sighted along Lampedusa in 2020.

== In popular culture ==
- Lampedusa was the filming location for the music video of Mango's single "Mediterraneo", from the album Come l'acqua (1992).
- Lampedusa was featured as the subject of the winning question in the 2007 National Geographic Bee Championship Round, worded as, "Lampedusa, an island whose geographical location has made it a target for illegal immigrants seeking to enter the European Union from Africa, is administered by which country?"

== See also ==
- List of islands of Italy
- LORAN-C transmitter Lampedusa
- Pantelleria
- Quadro Group
