= Linosa =

Italian island

Native name: Linusa (Sicilian)
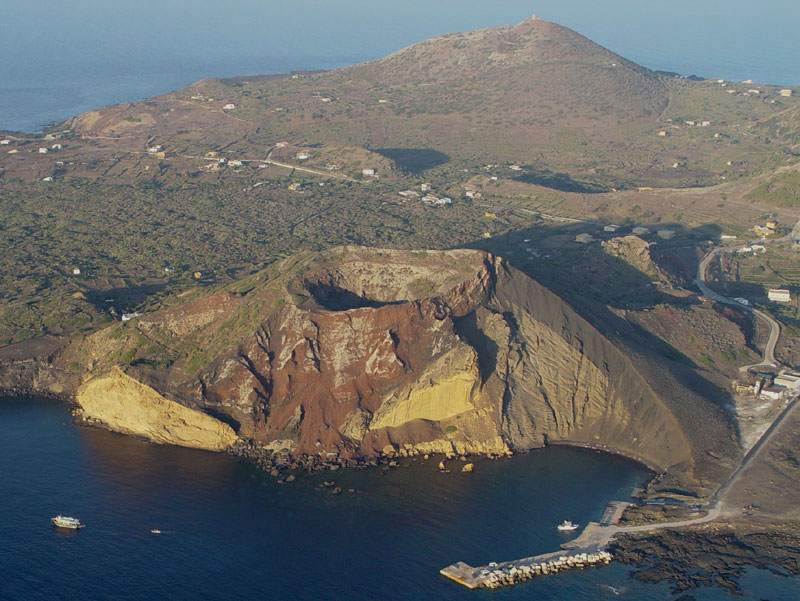
- Aerial view of Linosa

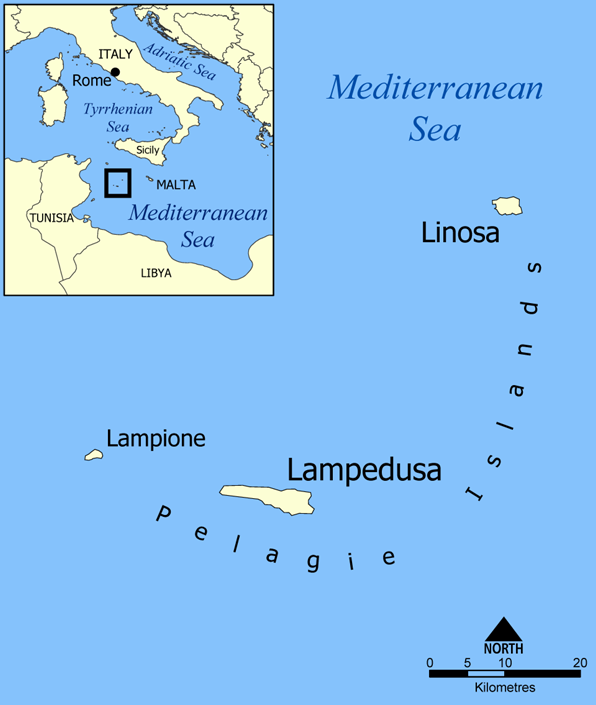

- Location within Sicily Location within Italy

Geography
- Location: Mediterranean Sea
- Coordinates: 35°52′N 12°52′E
- Archipelago: Pelagian Islands
- Area: 5.4 km^{2} (2.1 sq mi)

Administration
- Italy
- Region: Sicily
- Province: Agrigento
- Comune: Lampedusa e Linosa

Demographics
- Population: 430

Linosa (Italian: [liˈnoːza, -oːsa]; Sicilian: Linusa [lɪˈnuːsa]) is one of the Pelagian Islands in the Sicily Channel of the Mediterranean Sea.

The island is a part of the Italian comune of Lampedusa e Linosa, part of the province of Agrigento in Sicily, Italy. It has a population of 430.

== Name ==
The island is cited first as Greek Aethusa (Αἰθοῦσσα) by ancient geographers Strabo and Ptolemy, and as Algusa (Ἀλγοῦσσα) by Roman essayist Pliny the Elder in his Naturalis Historia. Ai thysíai (αἱ θυσίαι) is Greek for 'the sacrifices', probably referring to the twin volcanic peaks. The name "Lenusa" appeared first during the 16th century in the writing of Tommaso Fazello, while the modern one dates back to 1845.

== Geography ==
The island has an area of 5.45 square kilometres (2.10 sq mi) and is of volcanic origin. It is formed by a series of craters of which Monte Vulcano, 195 metres (640 feet) high, is the most important. The closest land to Linosa is the island of Lampedusa, which lies 43 km (27 mi) to the south. Linosa is situated 119 kilometres (74 miles) west of Gozo, Malta, 121 km (75 miles) southeast of Pantelleria, 163 km (101 mi) south of Sicily and 165 km (103 mi) east of Cape Mahida in Tunisia.

== History ==
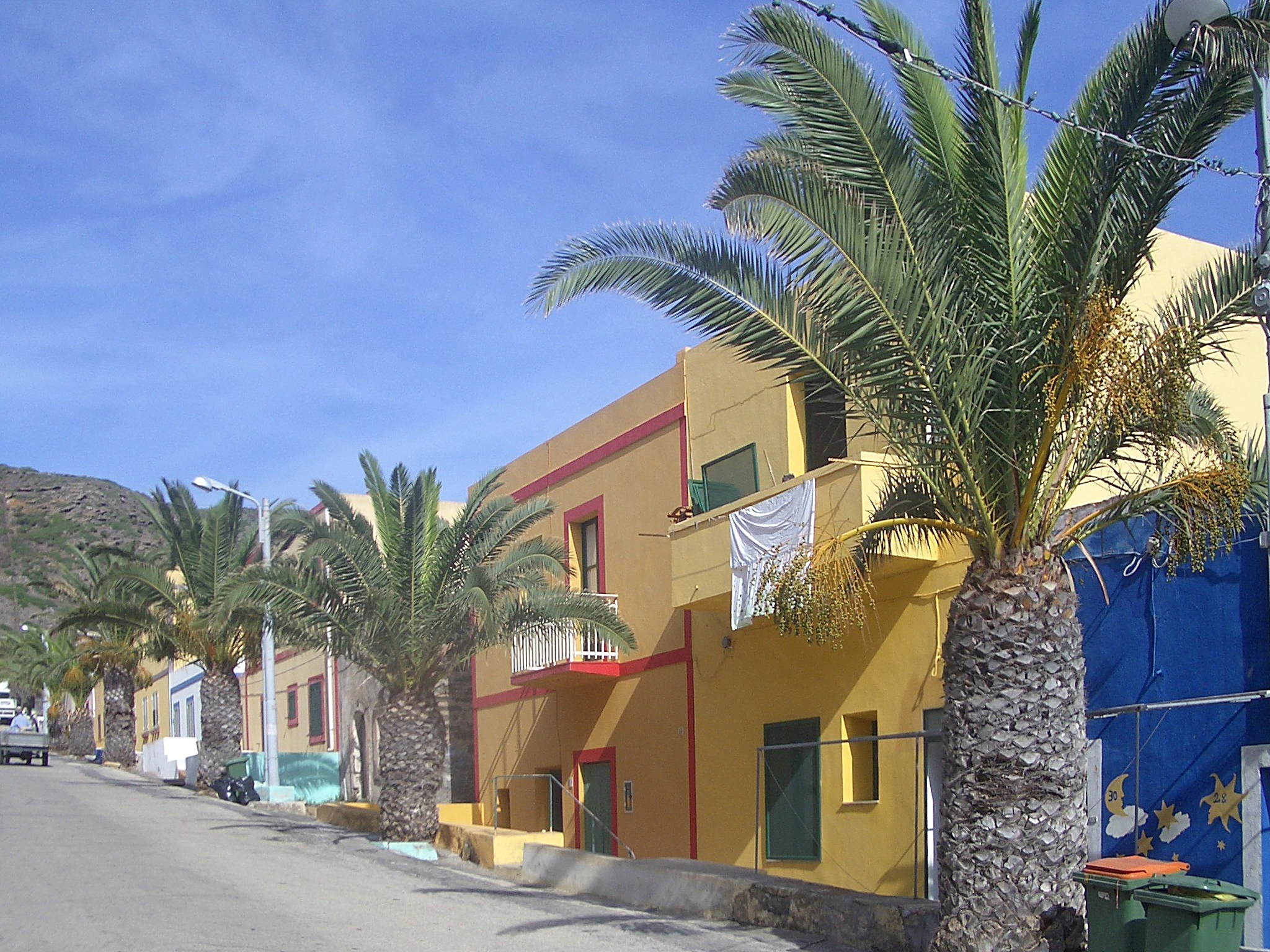
View of the village of Linosa

During the Punic Wars it was used by the Romans as a base; the 150 water cisterns remaining are from this period. Roman domination was followed by Saracen, Norman, Angevin and Aragonese control. During the Napoleonic Wars, the British considered the possibility of taking over Linosa (together with Pantelleria and Lampedusa) so as to be able to supply Malta, but a Royal Commission stated in an 1812 report that there would be considerable difficulties in this venture.

The island remained deserted until 1843 when Ferdinand II of the Two Sicilies ordered Knight Bernardo Maria Sanvinsente, captain of frigate, to colonize the island. The first thirty colonists (artisans from Ustica, Agrigento and Pantelleria) with the addition of a mayor, a priest and a doctor, landed on 25 April 1845.

During World War II, a small Italian garrison surrendered to a British force from HMS Nubian on the morning of 13 June 1943.

Few were interested in the island during the Kingdom of Italy and only in the 1970s did the island begin to change, with technological innovations and the development of tourism. The first telephone exchange was installed in 1963, the first power station in 1967, and a new school with a nursery in 1968. In 1983 the building of a desalinization plant provided a constant supply of potable water.

== Economy ==
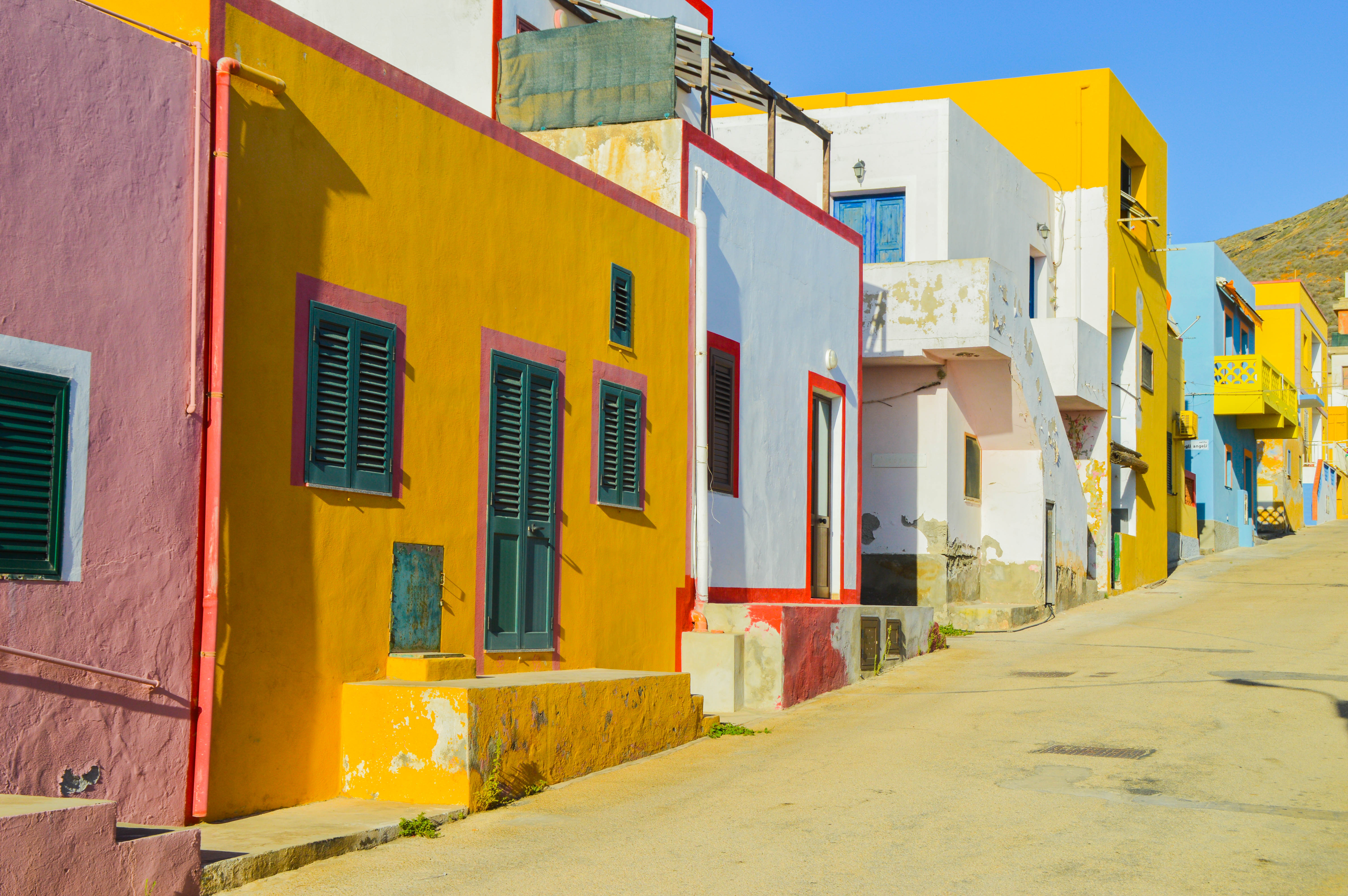
Houses in Linosa

Linosa's population subsists on agriculture and tourism. As of 2018, there are no airports, hotels or banks on the island.

== Geography ==
=== Climate ===
Linosa has a subtropical semi-arid climate (Köppen: BSh) characterized by very warm, almost rainless and humid summers, very mild and frost-free winters, a powerful seasonal lag and a small diurnal temperature range. The constant sea breezes moderate the daytime summer temperatures. Linosa (along with coastal Pantelleria, Kasos, Karpathos, Kastellorizo and coastal Malta) is one of the very few areas along the Mediterranean Sea coast, which have never recorded frost. The lowest temperature ever recorded in Linosa was 2.2 °C (36 °F) on 1 February 1999.

Climate data for Linosa 16 m. asl, 1991–2020 normals, extremes 1959–present
Month	Jan	Feb	Mar	Apr	May	Jun	Jul	Aug	Sep	Oct	Nov	Dec	Year
Record high °C (°F)	27.6 (81.7)	27.4 (81.3)	29.0 (84.2)	33.9 (93.0)	35.9 (96.6)	38.7 (101.7)	38.4 (101.1)	39.8 (103.6)	38.7 (101.7)	36.9 (98.4)	30.6 (87.1)	28.0 (82.4)	39.8 (103.6)
Mean daily maximum °C (°F)	18.5 (65.3)	18.3 (64.9)	20.0 (68.0)	22.1 (71.8)	24.3 (75.7)	27.5 (81.5)	29.4 (84.9)	29.5 (85.1)	29.0 (84.2)	27.0 (80.6)	23.2 (73.8)	19.0 (66.2)	23.9 (75.0)
Daily mean °C (°F)	16.0 (60.8)	15.8 (60.4)	16.9 (62.4)	18.8 (65.8)	21.3 (70.3)	24.7 (76.5)	26.8 (80.2)	27.3 (81.1)	26.3 (79.3)	24.0 (75.2)	20.7 (69.3)	17.2 (63.0)	21.3 (70.3)
Mean daily minimum °C (°F)	13.5 (56.3)	13.2 (55.8)	13.8 (56.8)	15.5 (59.9)	18.2 (64.8)	21.8 (71.2)	24.2 (75.6)	25.0 (77.0)	23.6 (74.5)	20.9 (69.6)	18.2 (64.8)	15.3 (59.5)	18.6 (65.5)
Record low °C (°F)	2.8 (37.0)	4.0 (39.2)	5.4 (41.7)	7.4 (45.3)	11.0 (51.8)	14.1 (57.4)	17.4 (63.3)	18.0 (64.4)	16.3 (61.3)	10.7 (51.3)	7.6 (45.7)	4.4 (39.9)	2.8 (37.0)
Average precipitation mm (inches)	42.6 (1.68)	29.7 (1.17)	23.6 (0.93)	21.5 (0.85)	6.0 (0.24)	2.3 (0.09)	1.0 (0.04)	2.8 (0.11)	15.5 (0.61)	59.3 (2.33)	63.3 (2.49)	51.5 (2.03)	319.1 (12.56)
Average precipitation days (≥ 1.0 mm)	7.4	4.7	3.8	2.6	1.3	0.3	0.1	0.2	2.0	5.8	5.5	7.1	40.8
Average relative humidity (%)	78	76	78	76	78	78	78	78	77	77	74	77	77
Source 1: Servizio Meteorologico
Source 2: Temperature estreme in Toscana

== See also ==
- List of islands of Italy
- Italy–Tunisia Delimitation Agreement
- List of volcanoes in Italy
- Terraferma
