= Lampione =

Italian island in the Mediterranean Sea

Native name: Lampiuni (Sicilian)
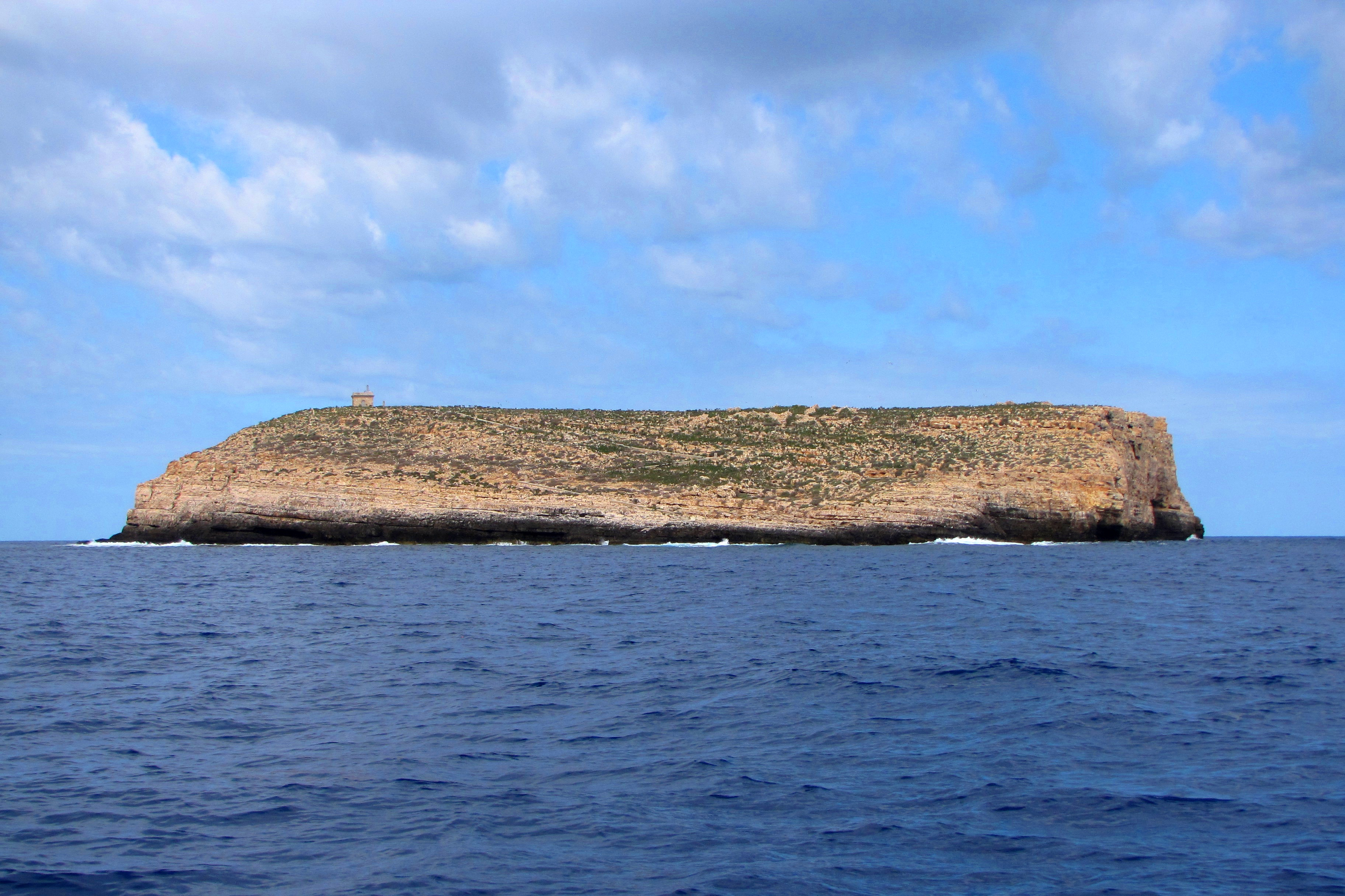

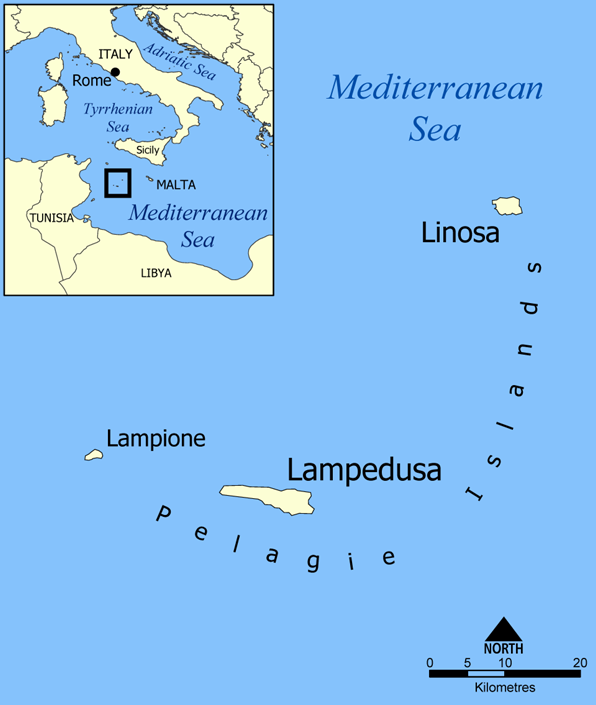

- Sicily Lampione (Mediterranean)

Geography
- Location: Africa
- Coordinates: 35°33′06″N 12°19′18″E
- Archipelago: Pelagian Islands
- Area: 0.036 km^{2} (0.014 sq mi)
- Length: 200 m (700 ft)
- Width: 180 m (590 ft)
- Highest elevation: 36 m (118 ft)

Administration
- Italy
- Region: Sicily
- Province: Agrigento
- Comune: Lampedusa e Linosa

Demographics
- Population: 0

Lampione (Italian: [lamˈpjoːne]; Sicilian: Lampiuni [lamˈbjuːnɪ]; Arabic: جزيرة الكتاب, romanized: Jazīrat al-Kitāb, lit. 'Island of the Book') is a small rocky island located in the Mediterranean Sea, which belongs geographically to the Pelagian Islands and administratively to the comune of Lampedusa e Linosa, Province of Agrigento, region of Sicily, Italy. It is about 200 metres (656 feet) long and 180 metres (591 feet) across, and has an area of 4 hectares (9.9 acres) and a highest elevation of 36 metres (118 feet).

The islet is uninhabited, the only building being a lighthouse. According to the legend, the island was a rock that had fallen from the hands of the cyclops Polyphemus.

Lampione is part of the Riserva Marina Isole Pelagie, and its vegetation and wildlife are strictly protected. Animal species include the endemic Podarcis filfolensis ssp. laurentimulleri (also found on Linosa), which is a subspecies of Maltese wall lizard, numerous migrating birds, and the Armadillidium hirtum pelagicum, a land crustacean. The waters are populated by sharks, including the sandbar shark, groupers, lobsters, and varieties of yellow and pink coral.

== See also ==
- List of islands of Italy
- Italy–Tunisia Delimitation Agreement
- Lampione Lighthouse
