= Pelagian Islands =

Italian island group on the African Plate

Native name: Ìsuli Pilaggî
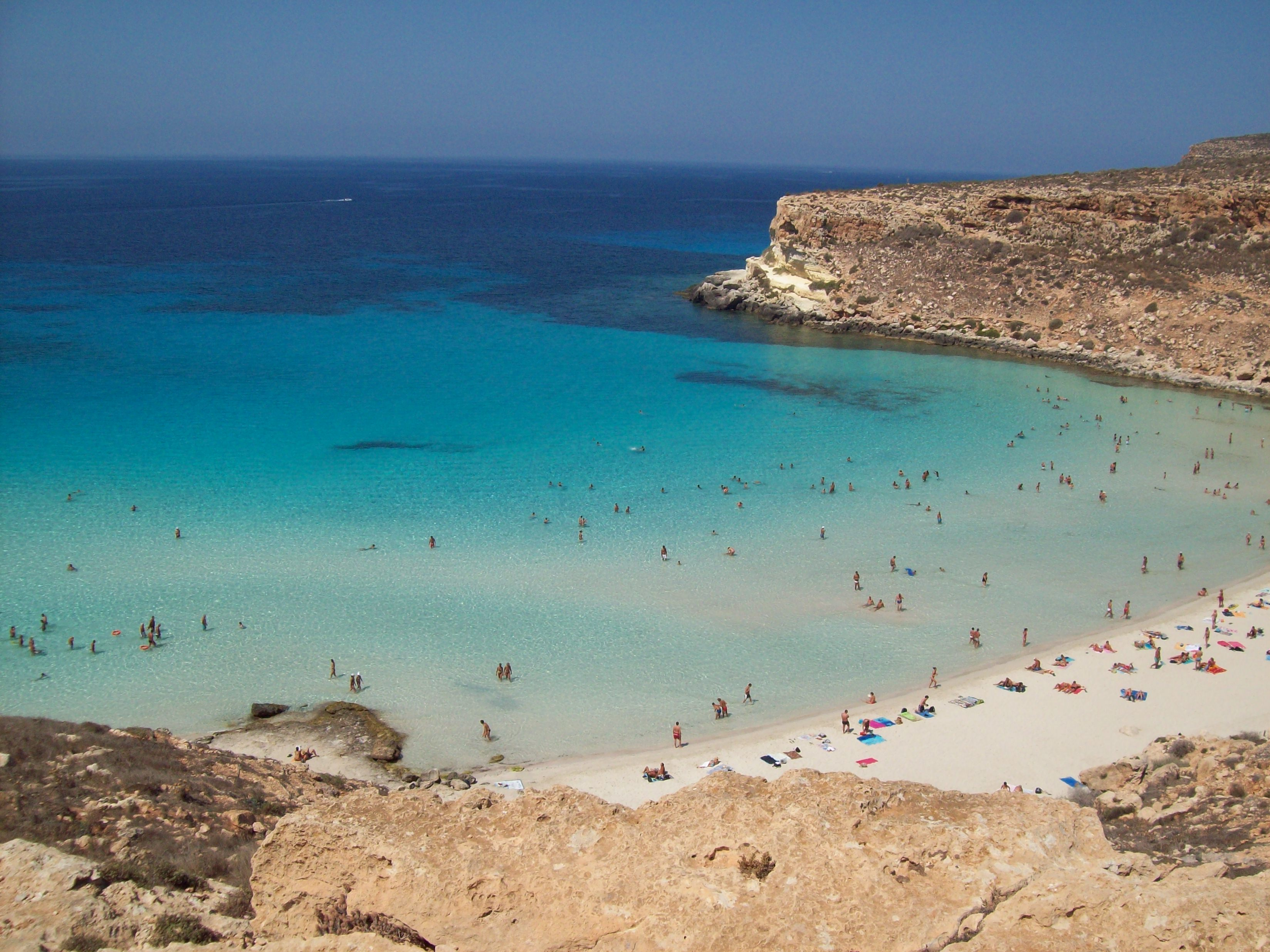
- Lampedusa

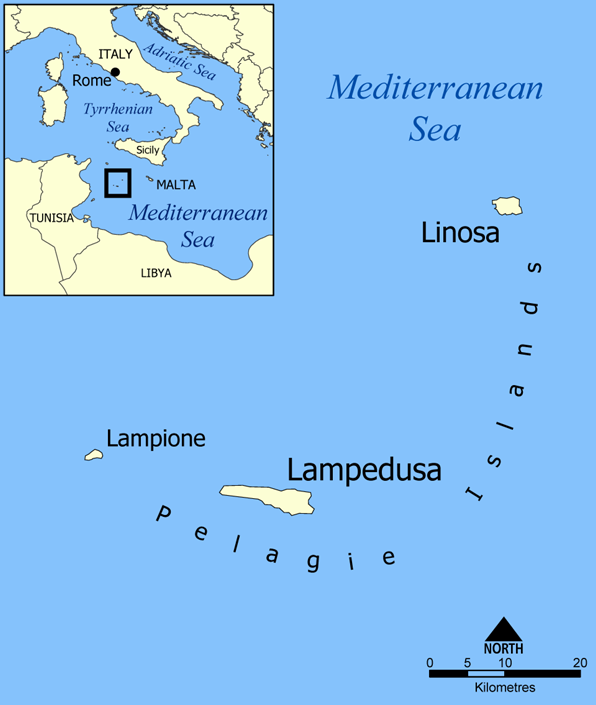

Geography
- Location: Mediterranean Sea
- Coordinates: 35°31′21″N 12°36′18″E
- Archipelago: Pelagie Islands
- Total islands: 3
- Major islands: Lampedusa, Lampione, and Linosa
- Area: 25.5 km^{2} (9.8 sq mi)

Administration
- Italy
- Region: Sicily
- Province: Agrigento
- Comune: Lampedusa e Linosa

Demographics
- Population: 6,556 (1 January 2019)

The Pelagian Islands or Pelagie Islands (Note: Italian: Isole Pelagie [ˈiːzole peˈlaːd͡ʒe]; Sicilian: Ìsuli Pilaggi [ˈiːsʊlɪ pɪˈladd͡ʒɪ]) are an archipelago of three small islands—Lampedusa, Lampione, and Linosa—located in the Mediterranean Sea between Malta and Tunisia, south of Sicily. To the northwest lie the island of Pantelleria and the Strait of Sicily. All three islands are part of the comune of Lampedusa e Linosa, in the Sicilian province of Agrigento. The Pelagian Islands are the southernmost part of Italy.

Geologically, Lampedusa and Lampione are on the African continental shelf. Linosa is of volcanic origin.

Despite pockets of agriculture, the islands are barren due to extensive deforestation and the disappearance of the native olive groves, juniper and carob plantations. Fifty years ago much of the landscape was farmland bounded by dry stone walls; but today the local economy is based on sponge fishing and canning, supplemented by tourism in Lampedusa.

The name of the archipelago ultimately comes from the Greek word πέλαγος (pélagos) meaning 'open sea'.

== History ==
The islands have been inhabited by Carthaginians and Romans throughout history as is evidenced by remains of Punic tombs and Roman buildings. In 1436 Lampedusa was given by Alfonso of Aragon to Don Giovanni de Caro, baron of Montechiaro. In 1553, the Turks raided Lampedusa, capturing 1000 slaves from their population. A colony was founded in 1843 by Ferdinand II of the Two Sicilies after French settlers arrived in 1760.

The islands held significant importance in World War II because of its nautical and aerial infrastructure, which would help the Allies launch an invasion of Sicily. On 9 May 1943, Operation Corkscrew began with the bombing of Pantelleria. Pantelleria would be captured by the Allies on 11 June 1943 after the surrender of admiral Gino Pavesi. Meanwhile, bombing campaigns on the island of Lampedusa would begin on 5 June 1943. Lampedusa would further be subjected to a British landing on 7 June, which would be repelled. On 12 June, a final bombardment would annihilate the Italian defenses, leading to Captain Orazio Bernardini surrendering. On 13 June, the operation ended with the capture of Linosa and Lampione. Today, the islands serve as a stepping stone for immigrants to get from North Africa to Italy.

== Environment ==
=== Birds ===
The Pelagian Islands have been recognised as an Important Bird Area (IBA) by BirdLife International because they support breeding populations of Scopoli's shearwaters and European shags.

=== Marine protected area ===
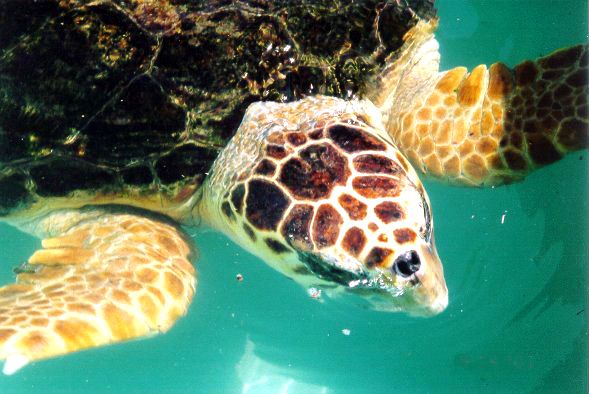
A loggerhead turtle

Of particular ecological concern in the islands is the protection of the loggerhead sea turtle (Caretta caretta) which is endangered throughout the Mediterranean as a result of its nesting sites being taken over by tourism. In Italy the beaches of Pozzolana di Ponente on Linosa and Isola dei conigli on Lampedusa are two of the last remaining sites where the turtle regularly lays its eggs, the other (larger) sites being in southern Calabria (close to Reggio Calabria). The it:Area Marina Protetta Isole Pelagie nature reserve, covering all three islands, was instituted in 2002.

== See also ==
- List of islands of Italy
