= List of extreme points of Italy =

This is a list of the extreme points of Italy: the points that are farther north, south, east or west than any other location, as well as the highest and lowest points.

== Latitude and longitude ==
Latitude and longitude extremities of Italy
- Northernmost point: Testa Gemella Occidentale, Predoi, Alto Adige at 47°5′N 12°11′E
- Southernmost point on the mainland: Melito di Porto Salvo, Calabria at 37°56′N 16°3′E; on island: Punta Pesce Spada, Lampedusa at 35°29′N 12°36′E;
- Westernmost point: Rocca Bernauda, Bardonecchia, Piedmont at 45°6′N 6°37′E
- Easternmost point: Capo d'Otranto, Otranto, Apulia at 40°6′N 18°31′E

== Elevation ==
- Highest point: Monte Bianco, Courmayeur (4,807.5 m) at 45°50′N 6°51′E
- Lowest point: Le Contane, Jolanda di Savoia (-3.44 m) at 44°53′N 11°59′E
- Highest settlement: Trepalle, Livigno (2,209 m) at 46°32′N 10°11′E

== See also ==
- Geography of Italy
- Extreme points of Earth
