= Geography of Italy =

- Continent: Europe
- Region: Southern Europe
- Coordinates: 42°00′N 12°05′E
- Area: Ranked 71st
  - Total: 301,230 km^{2} (116,310 sq mi)
  - Land: 97.61%
  - Water: 2.39%
- Coastline: 7,900 km (4,900 mi)
- Borders: Total land borders 1,836.4 km (1,141.1 mi)
- Highest point: Mont Blanc; 4,810 m (15,780 ft)
- Lowest point: Jolanda di Savoia −3.44 m (−11.3 ft)
- Longest river: Po; 652 km (405 mi)
- Largest lake: Garda; 370 km^{2} (140 mi^{2})
- Climate: Mediterranean climate, mountain climate (Alps and Appennines)
- Exclusive economic zone: 541,915 km^{2} (209,235 mi^{2})

The geography of Italy includes the description of all the physical geographical elements of Italy. Italy, whose territory largely coincides with the homonymous geographical region, is located in southern Europe and comprises the long, boot-shaped Italian Peninsula crossed by the Apennines, the southern side of Alps, the large plain of the Po Valley and some islands including Sicily and Sardinia. Italy is part of the Northern Hemisphere. Two of the Pelagian Islands (Lampedusa and Lampione) are located on the African continent.

The total area of Italy is 301,230 km^{2} (116,310 sq mi), of which 294,020 km^{2} (113,520 sq mi) is land and 7,210 km^{2} (2,784 sq mi) is water. It lies between latitudes 35° and 47° N, and longitudes 6° and 19° E. Italy borders Switzerland (698 km or 434 mi), France (476 km or 296 mi), Austria (404 km or 251 mi) and Slovenia (218 km or 135 mi). San Marino (37 km or 23 mi) and Vatican City (3.4 km or 2.1 mi) are enclaves. The total border length is 1,836.4 km (1,141.1 mi). Including islands, Italy has a coastline of 7,900 km (4,900 mi) on the Adriatic Sea, Ionian Sea, Tyrrhenian Sea, Ligurian Sea, Sea of Sardinia and Strait of Sicily.

The Italian geographical region, in its traditional and most widely accepted extent, has an area of approximately 324,000 square kilometres (125,000 mi^{2}), which is greater than the area of the entire Italian Republic (301,230 square kilometres or 116,310 square miles). The Italian geographical region also includes territories that are sovereign parts of Croatia, France, Slovenia and Switzerland, as well as the four small independent states of the Principality of Monaco, the Republic of Malta, the Republic of San Marino and the Vatican City State (the Holy See).

== General features ==
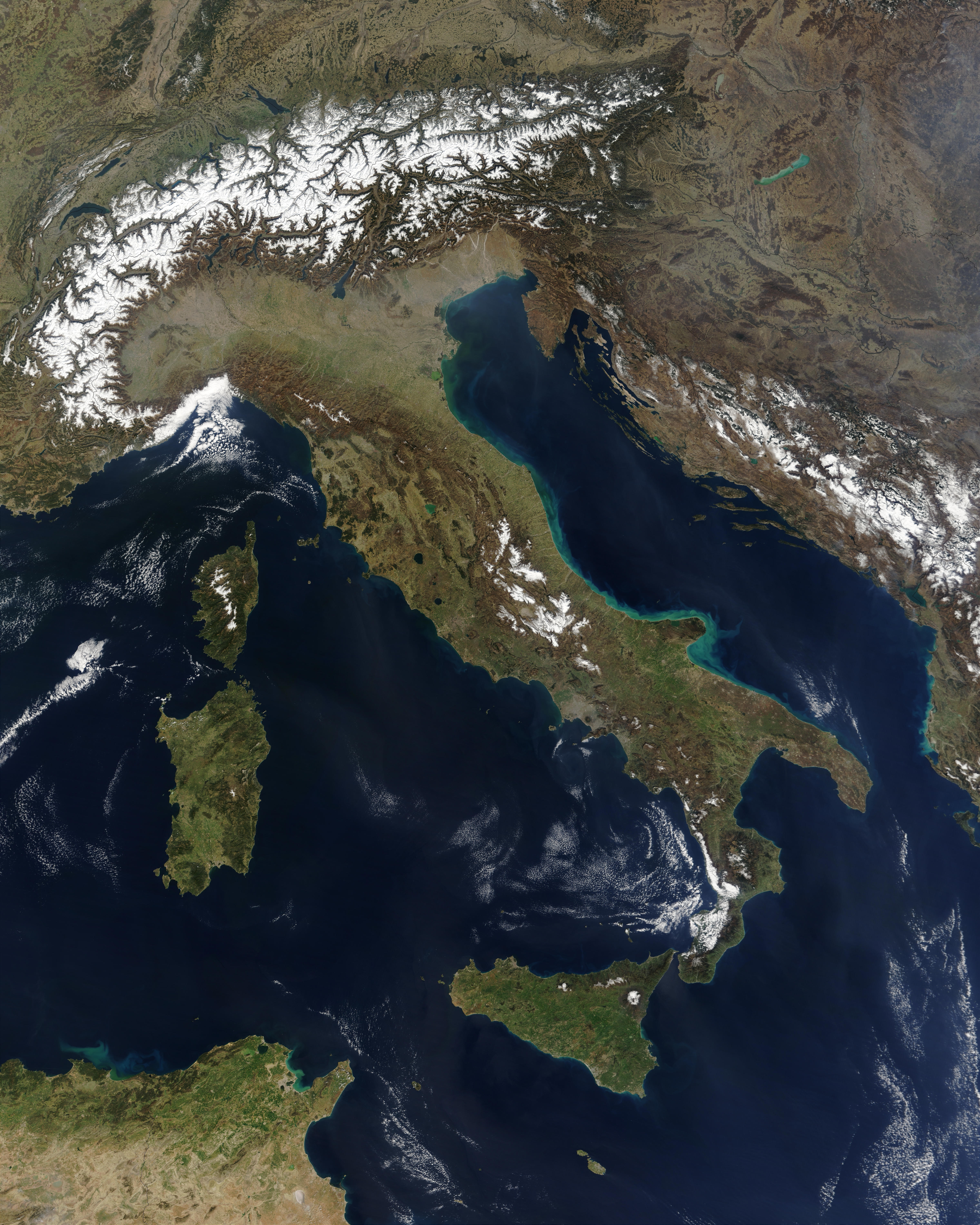
Satellite image of Italy.

Italy is joined to the central-western section of the European continent by the Alps. Due to its position, it constitutes a bridge between Europe and Africa. In particular, the Italian Peninsula is located in the center of the Mediterranean Sea, between the Balkans and Hellenic Peninsula to the east, the Iberian Peninsula to the west, North Africa to the south and continental Europe to the north separated by the Alps.

Italy also separates the western basin of the Mediterranean Sea from the eastern basin — that is, the Tyrrhenian Sea from the Ionian Sea — extending towards the west with Calabria and Sicily, which together geologically form a peninsular extension. Only 140 km (87 mi) separate Sicily and Africa (Tunisia), by the channel of Sicily.

To the east, Salento is 70 km (43 mi) from the Albanian coast, at the narrowest point of the Strait of Otranto. It is Capo d'Otranto (also called Punta Palascìa), located at 40° 7' north latitude and 18° 31' east longitude. To the north of Salento lies the long and narrow inlet of the Adriatic Sea.

Map of the climate of Italy

The islands of Sardinia and Corsica then divide the Tyrrhenian Sea from the Sardinian Sea.

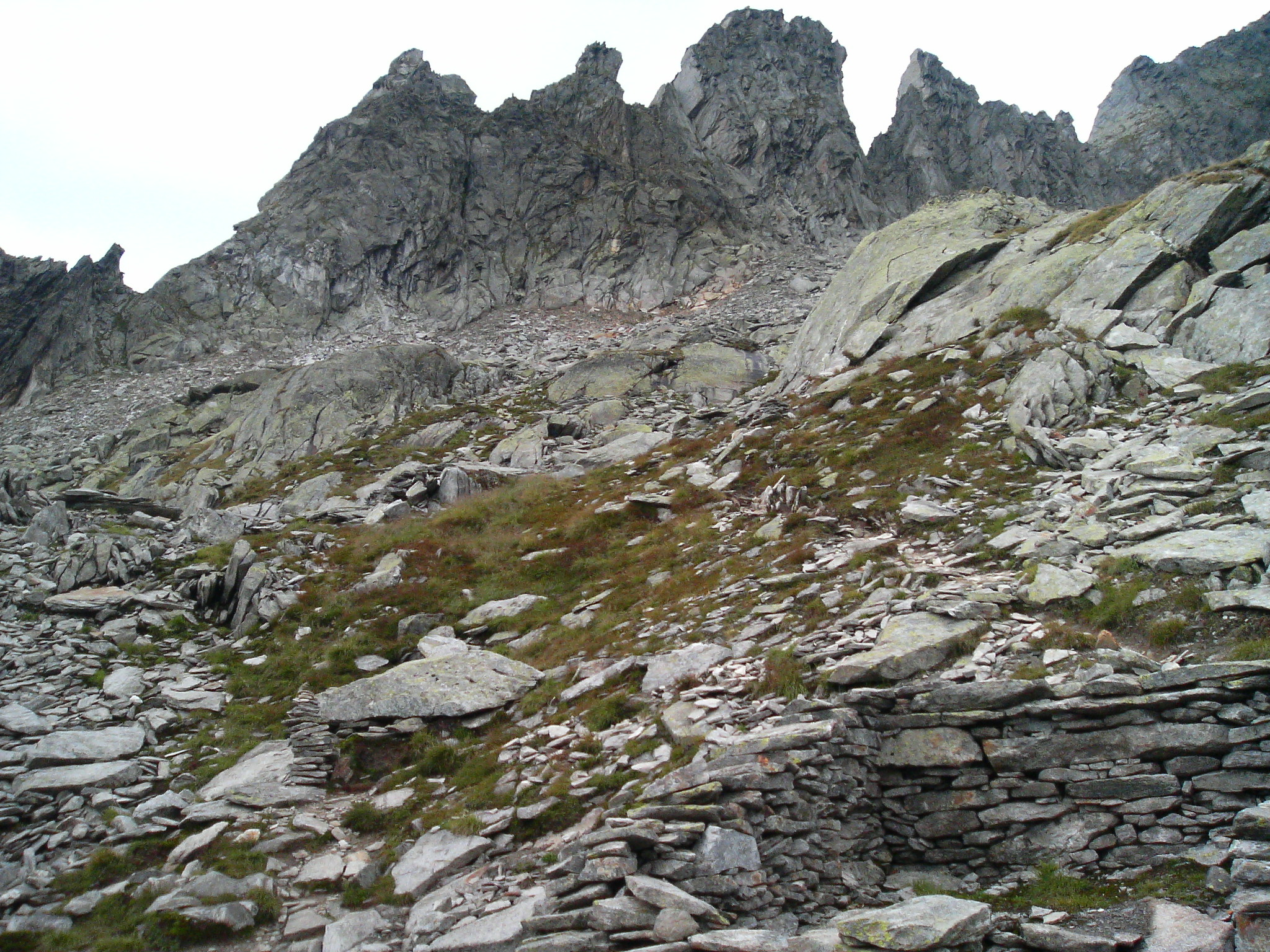
Vetta d'Italia, until 1997 considered the northernmost point of Italy, is now located 400 m further north in the Testa Gemella Occidentale

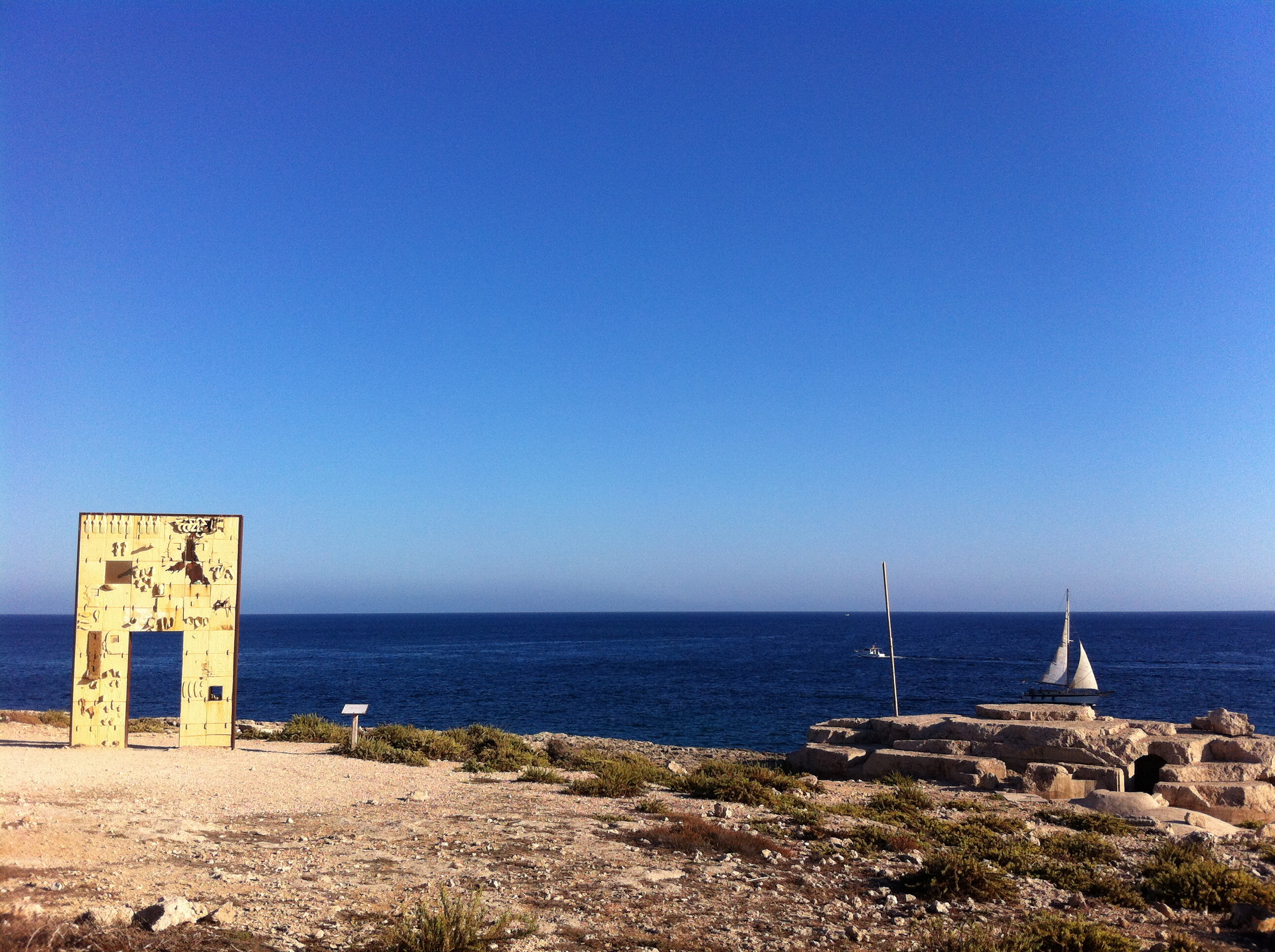
Punta Pesce Spada in Lampedusa, the southernmost point

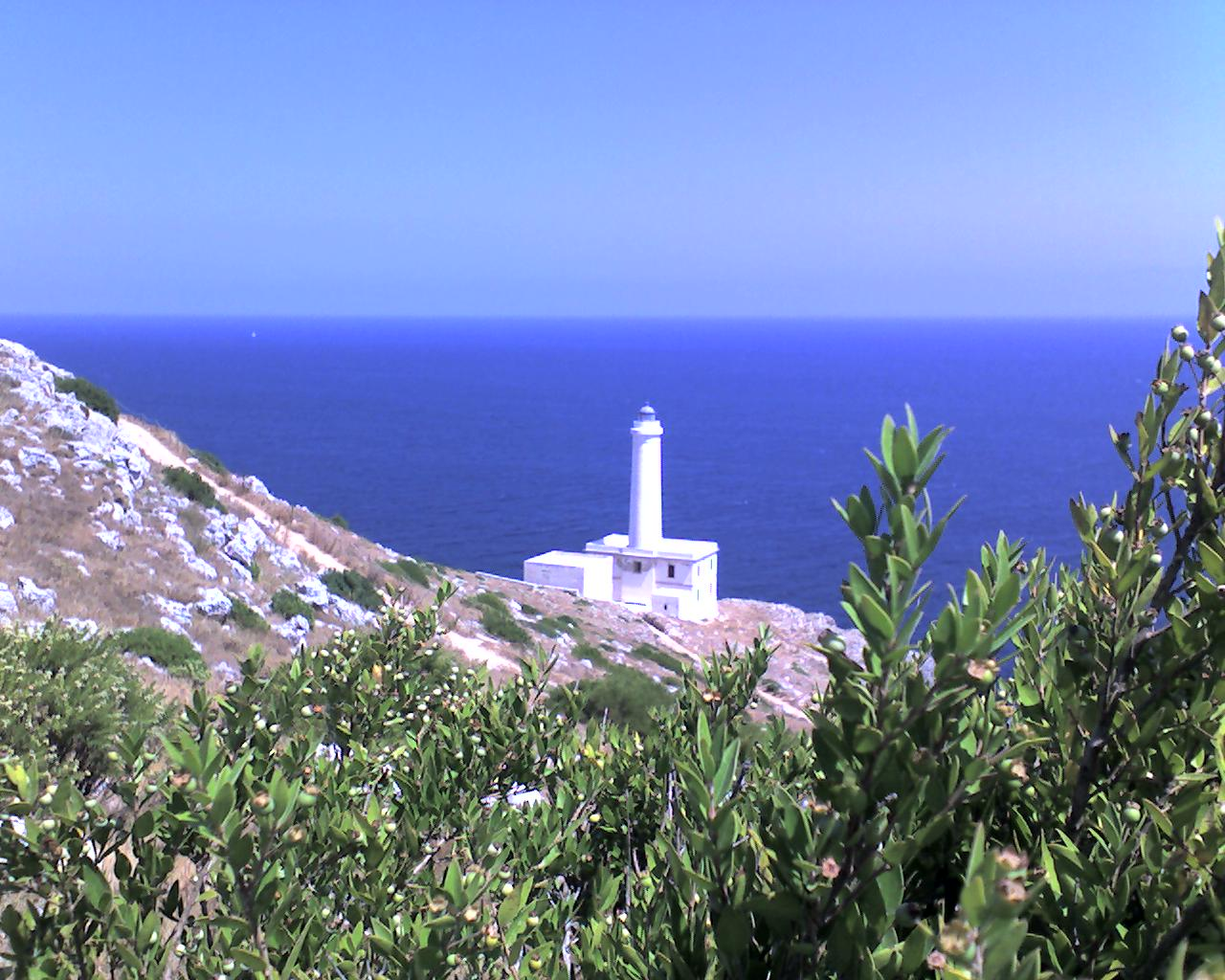
The lighthouse of Punta Palascìa, better known as Capo d'Otranto, the easternmost point of the Italian territory

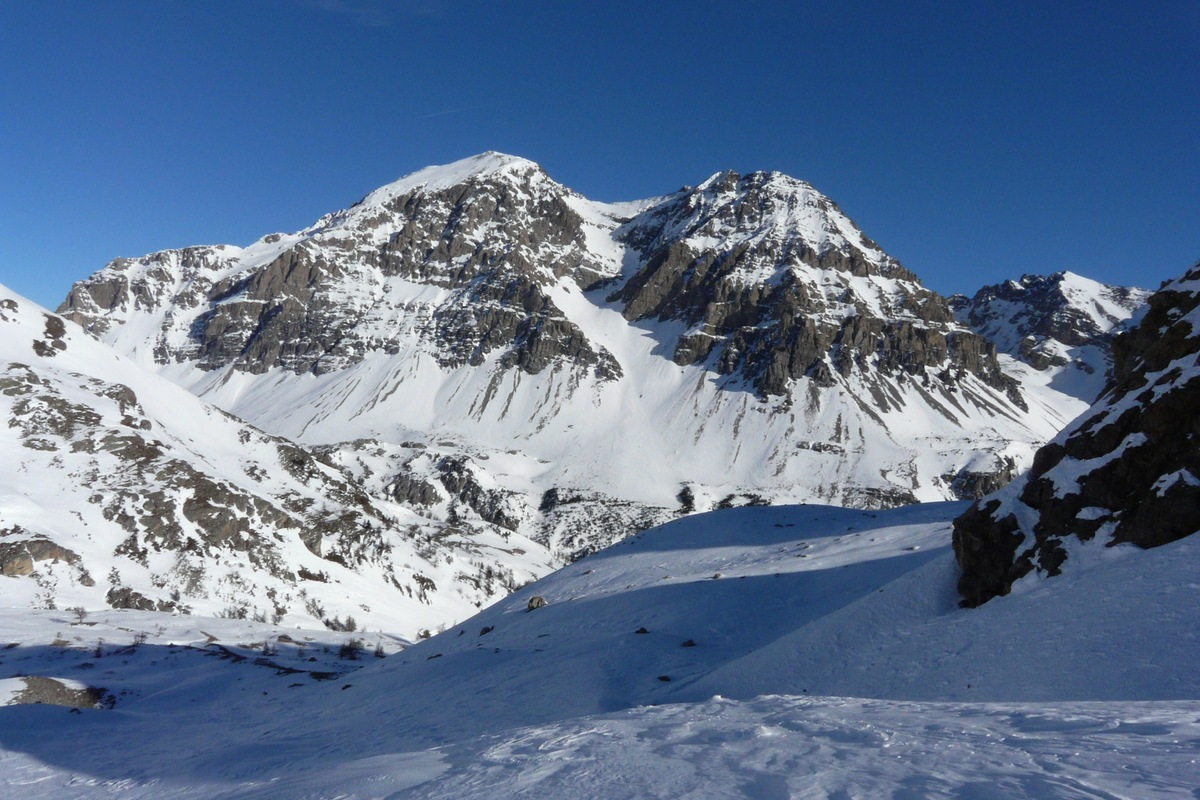
Rocca Bernauda, the westernmost point of the Italian territory

The coastal development of the Italian Peninsula and islands is vast; about 8,000 kilometres (5,000 mi), which is much larger than that of the Iberian Peninsula, but much less than that of the Balkans.

Italy has a prevalence of hilly areas (41.6% of the territory) compared to mountainous areas (35.2% of the territory), or flat areas (23.2%).

The Italian soil today is the result of anthropization and is partly mountainous, partly hilly, partly volcanic, partly endolagunar with bumps, polesine, islands, dried up by reclamation (Bonifiche Circeo, Ferraresi, Comacchio, Ostiense, Pisana and so on) with ever greater raising of embankments (for example the withdrawal of 1.7 billion cubic meters per year of fresh water, from 20 consortia from Veneto alone).

No inhabited center in Italy is more than 294 km (183 mi) from the sea and the Italian municipality farthest from the sea is Madesimo (province of Sondrio) which is 294 km (183 mi) from the Ligurian Sea.

=== Boundaries ===
Italy borders Switzerland (698 km or 434 mi), France (476 km or 296 mi), Austria (404 km or 251 mi) and Slovenia (218 km or 135 mi). San Marino (37 km or 23 mi) and Vatican City (3.4 km or 2.1 mi) are enclaves. The total border length is 1,836.4 km (1,141.1 mi). Including islands, Italy has a coastline of 7,900 km (4,900 mi) on the Adriatic Sea, Ionian Sea, Tyrrhenian Sea, Ligurian Sea, Sea of Sardinia and Strait of Sicily.

=== Latitude and longitude ===
- Northernmost point — Testa Gemella Occidentale, Prettau (Predoi), South Tyrol at 47°5′N 12°11′E
- Southernmost point — Punta Pesce Spada, Lampedusa, Sicily at 35°29′N 12°36′E (whole territory); Capo Spartivento, Palizzi, Calabria at 37°55′N 15°59′E (mainland)
- Westernmost point — Rocca Bernauda, Bardonecchia, Piedmont at 45°6′N 6°37′E
- Easternmost point — Capo d'Otranto, Otranto, Apulia at 40°6′N 18°31′E

The distance that separates the Testa Gemella Occidentale from Punta Pesce Spada is 1,291 km (802 mi); the maximum distance between the eastern and western borders is about 600 km (370 mi). The municipalities at the ends of Italy are:

- Predoi, the northernmost municipality
- Lampedusa e Linosa, the southernmost municipality
- Otranto, the easternmost municipality
- Bardonecchia, the westernmost municipality

=== Elevation ===
- Highest point: Mont Blanc (Aosta Valley) 4,810.90 metres (15,783.8 ft) at 45°50′N 6°51′E
- Lowest point: Jolanda di Savoia (province of Ferrara) −3.44 metres (−11.3 ft) at 44°53′N 11°59′E
- Highest settlement: Trepalle, Livigno 2,209 metres (7,247 ft) at 46°32′N 10°11′E

=== Maritime claims ===
- Territorial sea: 12 nmi (22.2 km; 13.8 mi)
- Continental shelf: 200-metre depth (660 ft) or to the depth of exploitation
- Exclusive Economic Zone: 541,915 km^{2} (209,235 mi^{2})

=== Geographical centre ===
Although the Istituto Geografico Militare of Florence has repeatedly declared that it is impossible to uniquely determine the center of a non-geometric shape such as that of Italy, there are several locations that, depending on the measurement criteria adopted, compete for the primacy of the geographical centre of Italy:

- Monteluco (province of Perugia);
- Narni (province of Terni);
- Orvieto (province of Terni);
- Rieti (province of Rieti).

== Land use ==
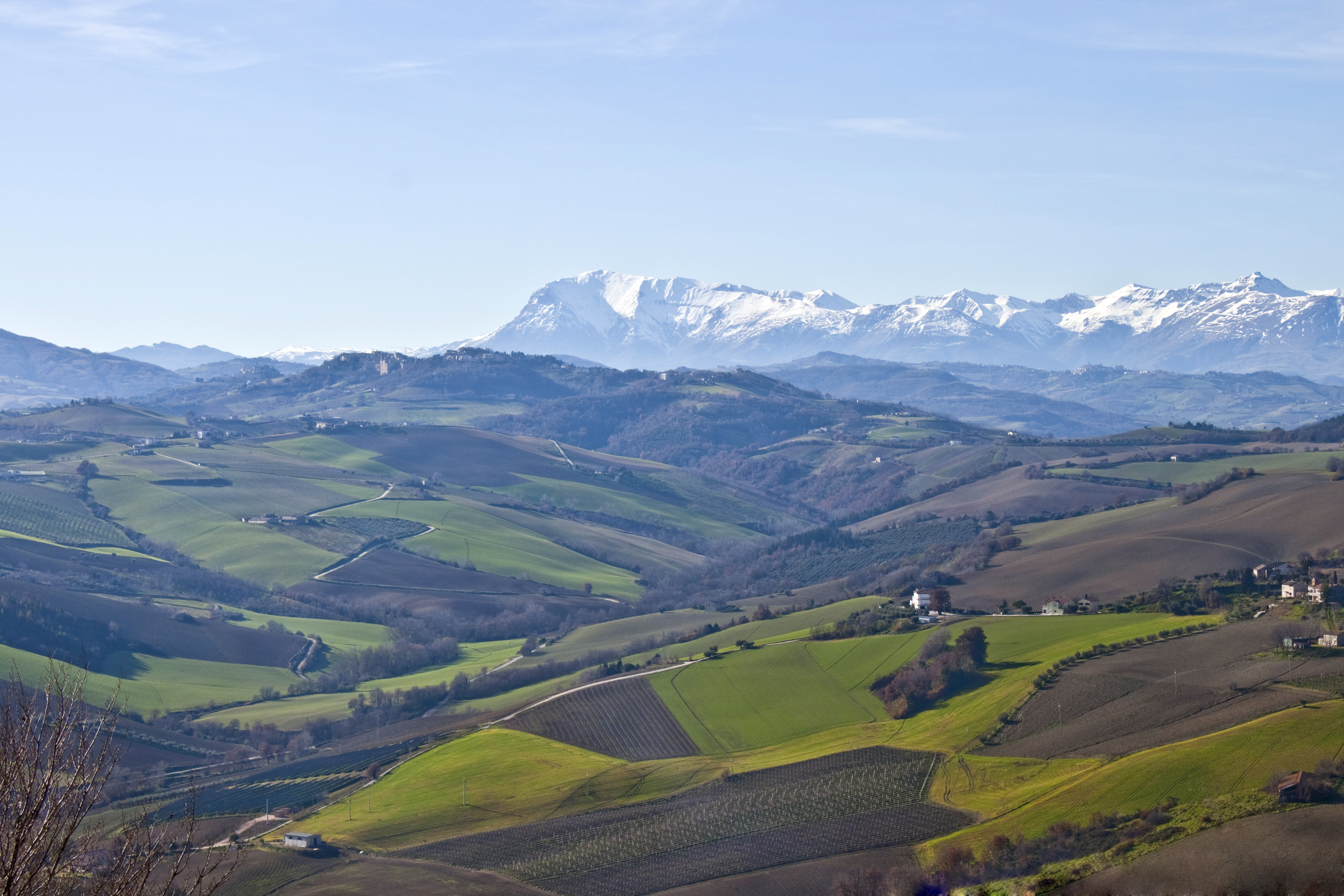
Apennine landscape in Marche

(Note: 2006 estimates.)

- Artificial (urban, industrial etc.): 4.9%
- Agricultural: 52.2%
  - Arable land: 27.9%
  - Permanent: 7.1%
  - Other: 17.2%
- Wood: 41.4%
- Wetlands: 0.4%
- Water (lakes etc.): 1.1%

=== Irrigated land ===
- 39,510 km^{2} (2007)

=== Total renewable water resources ===
- 191.3 km^{3} (2011)

=== Freshwater withdrawal (domestic/industrial/agricultural) ===
- total: 45.41 km^{3}/yr (24%/43%/34%)
- per capita: 789.8 m^{3}/yr (2008)

== Divisions ==
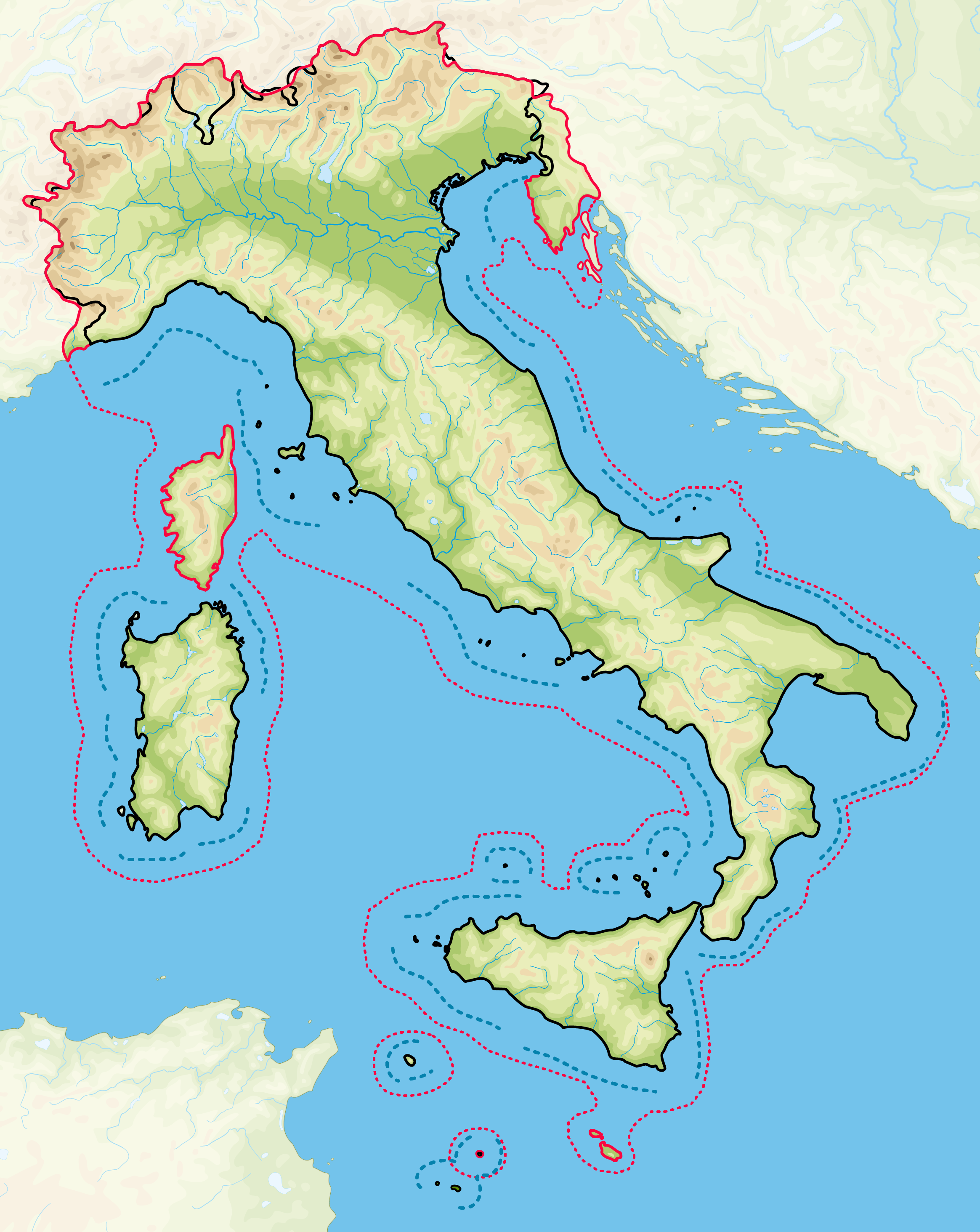
In black, the borders of the Italian Republic, in red the borders of the Italian geographical region.

The Italian geographical region, in its traditional and most widely accepted extent, has an area of approximately 324,000 square kilometres (125,000 mi^{2}), which is greater than the area of the entire Italian Republic (301,230 square kilometres or 116,310 square miles). The Italian geographical region also includes territories that are sovereign parts of Croatia, France, Slovenia and Switzerland, as well as the four small independent states of the Principality of Monaco, the Republic of Malta, the Republic of San Marino and the Vatican City State (the Holy See). Italy and the Italian geographical region are both divided into three parts, albeit with some differences.

=== Continental Italy ===
Continental Italy defined as the southern side of the Alps, the Po Valley, Liguria and the portion of the Apennines bounded by the conventional line that connects La Spezia to Rimini. The region of Nice (corresponding to the historic County of Nice), Italian Switzerland, part of Julian March and other less extensive portions of territory such as Valle Stretta, Gondo and Val Monastero, are not part of the Italian Republic in its continental part but they are part of the Italian geographical region. Conversely, the Val di Lei, the Val di Livigno, the San Candido basin, the Rio Sesto valley and the Tarvisio basin, although part of the Italian Republic, are not included in the Italian geographical region.

=== Peninsular Italy ===
Peninsular Italy refers to the entire southern part of the aforementioned line, up to Punta Melito in Calabria (which is the southernmost point of the peninsula) and Santa Maria di Leuca in Apulia. San Marino and the Vatican City are foreign territories, although included in the Italian geographical region.

The Italian peninsula occupies a median position between the three main peninsulas of southern Europe, emerging right in the center of the Mediterranean Sea, with large islands and some archipelagos.

=== Insular Italy ===
Map of Italian islands.

Insular Italy is made up of Sardinia, Sicily and numerous smaller islands, scattered or grouped into archipelagos in the seas that bathe the coasts of the peninsula. Corsica is not politically included in insular Italy since it belongs to France, however, it is included in the Italian geographical region.

The five largest islands belonging to the Italian state are, in order of size:

- Sicily (25,707 km^{2} or 9,926 sq mi)
- Sardinia (24,090 km^{2} or 9,300 sq mi)
- Elba (223 km^{2} or 86 sq mi)
- Sant'Antioco (108.9 km^{2} or 42.0 sq mi)
- Pantelleria (83 km^{2} or 32 sq mi).

Other islands belonging to Italy are grouped into the following archipelagos:

- Archipelago of the Gulf of La Spezia, formed by the island of Palmaria, Tino and Tinetto;
- Tuscan archipelago, formed by the island of Elba, the largest and most important of the group from whose bowels iron has been extracted for centuries. To the north of the island of Elba rise Capraia and Gorgona, to the south Pianosa, Montecristo, Giannutri and the island of Giglio. Minor islets are Cerboli and Palmaiola off the coast of Elba, the Islet of the Sparviero at Punta Ala, the Formiche di Grosseto, the Formica di Burano, the Formica di Montecristo (or Scoglio d'Africa) and some islets off the coast of promontory of the Argentario including Argentarola, Isola Rossa and Isolotto, in addition to the Secche della Meloria and the Secche di Vada.
- The Phlegraean Islands (Ischia and Procida) plus Capri, in the Gulf of Naples; sometimes the three islands are included in the Campanian Archipelago;
- Pontine Islands: Ponza, Palmarola, Zannone and Ventotene, in the gulf of Gaeta;
- Archipelago of the Aeolian Islands or Lipari, which includes Salina, Lipari, the largest of the group, Vulcano, a now almost extinct volcano; Panarea and then Stromboli, an eruptive cone still in activity which was called Stronghilo by the ancient Greeks (hence Stromboli), due to its conical shape of an inverted top on the sea; to these must be added Filicudi and Alicudi;
- Aegadian Islands, i.e. the islands of Favignana, Marettimo, Levanzo and Stagnone, which arise between Marsala and Trapani, west of Sicily;
- Pelagian Islands, including Linosa, Lampione and Lampedusa;
- In Sicily we still find Ustica off the Gulf of Palermo and Pantelleria in the middle of the Sicilian Channel;
- The group of the Tremiti Islands and the island of Pianosa, which rise in the Adriatic Sea;
- To the north of Sardinia the Asinara and the archipelago of La Maddalena, to the south San Pietro and Sant'Antioco.
- The Cheradi Islands of San Pietro and San Paolo in the Gulf of Taranto.

== Orography ==
=== Mountains ===
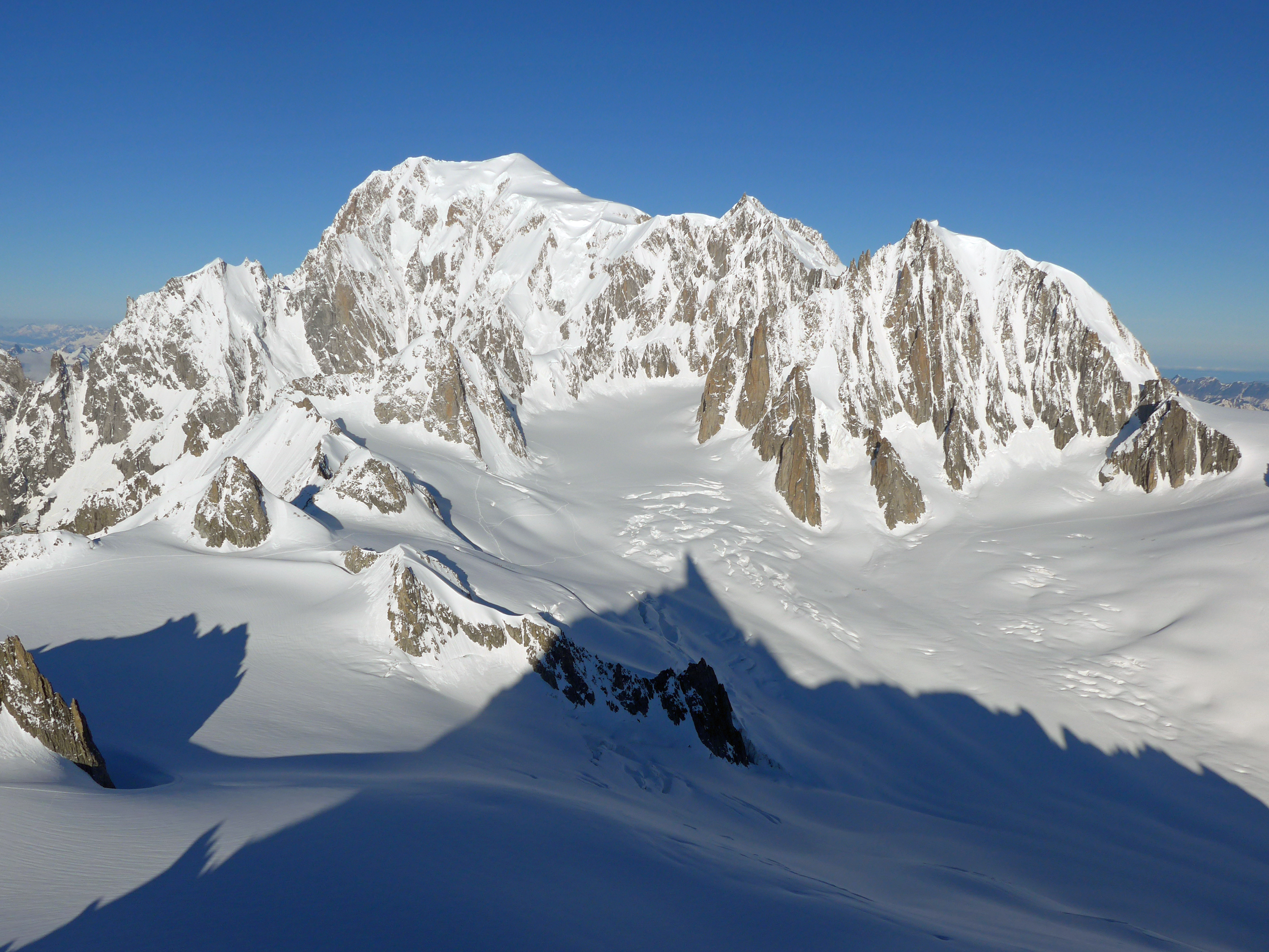
Mont Blanc (Monte Bianco) in Aosta Valley, the highest point in the European Union

Almost 40% of the Italian territory is mountainous, with the Alps as the northern boundary and the Apennine Mountains forming the backbone of the peninsula and extending for 1,350 km (840 mi). The Alpine mountain range is linked with the Apennines with the Colle di Cadibona pass in the Ligurian Alps. Nineteen Italian regions are crossed by either the Alps or the Apennines, or their offshoots. Sardinia has mountains with their own characteristics and are included in the Sardinian-Corsican relief, since it also affects Corsica.

The Alps (formed during the Mesozoic and Cenozoic) surround the Po Valley to the north, east and west, and develop along the entire northern border of Italy (about 1,000 km or 620 mi), creating a natural border. The Alps contain the highest peak in the European Union, Mont Blanc, at 4,810 meters (15,780 ft) above sea level, located between the Aosta Valley and France.

The Apennines (formed during the Oligocene) rise south of the Po Valley and run from north to south throughout the Italian peninsula, from Liguria to Calabria and continue in northern Sicily ending in the Madonie, acting as a watershed between the Tyrrhenian and Adriatic-Ionian coast.

The highest peaks in Italy are found in the Western Alps, where there are numerous peaks that exceed 4,000 meters (13,000 ft) including Monte Rosa (4,634 meters or 15,203 feet), the Cervino (4,478 meters or 14,692 feet) and Mont Blanc which with its 4,810 meters (15,780 ft). The maximum height of the Apennines is the Gran Sasso d'Italia (2,912 meters or 9,554 feet).

Famous mountains in Italy are Monte Cervino (Matterhorn), Monte Rosa, Gran Paradiso in the West Alps, and Bernina, Stelvio and Dolomites along the eastern side of the Alps.

=== Hills ===
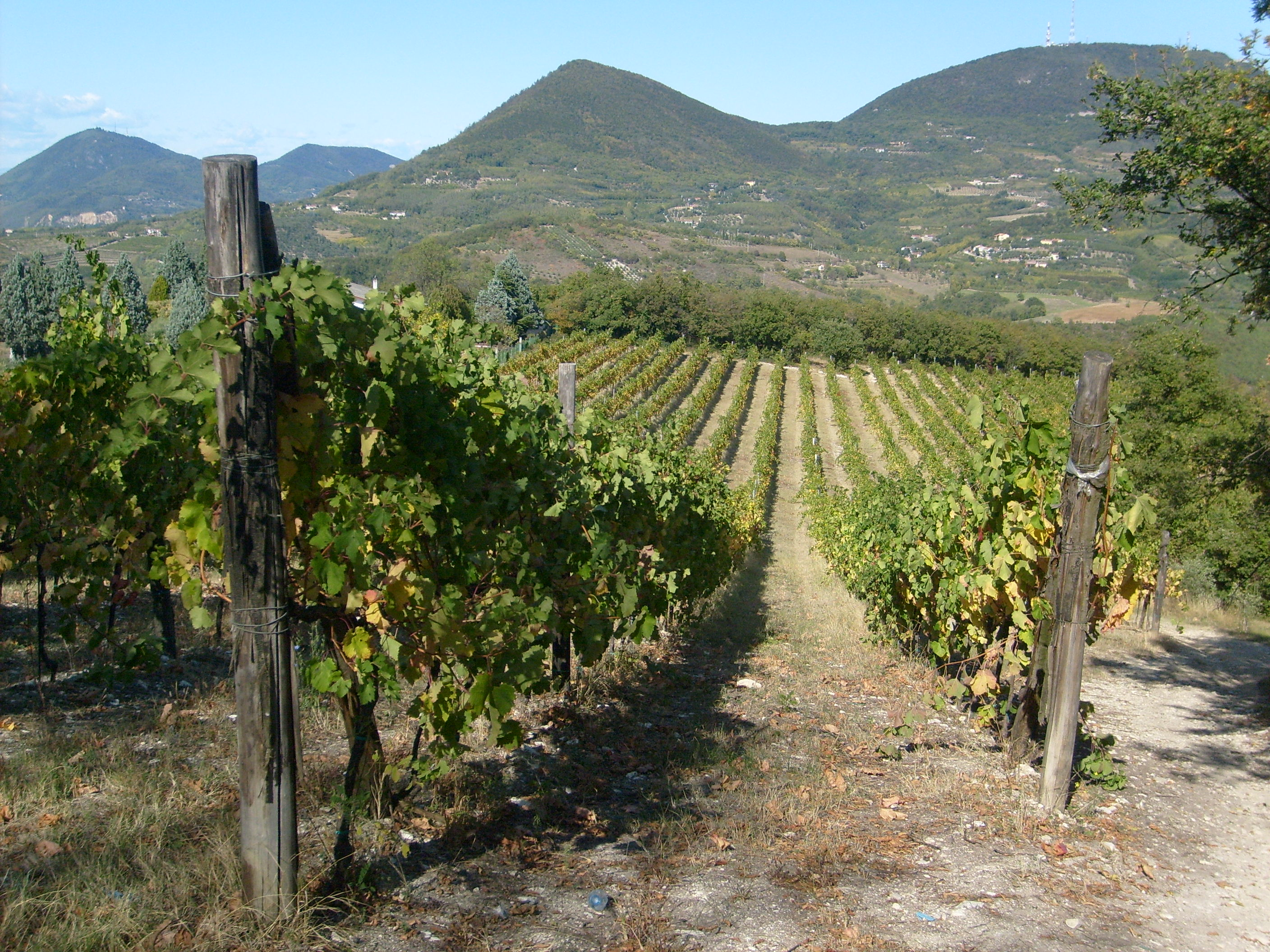
Euganean Hills

The hills cover most of the Italian territory. They are mainly located in the central-southern part of the peninsula, along the sides of the Apennine ridge, but also in the pre-Alpine area, close to the Alps.

The hilly reliefs, which alternate with hollows and valleys, have slight slopes and do not exceed 800 meters or 2,600 feet.

The first two hilly systems are the subalpine hills and the Preappennino, two hilly strips arranged between the Alps and the Po Valley and between the Apennines and the Adriatic coast respectively. The subalpine hills widen more in the western part of the Po Valley, where they form the hills of the Langhe and Montferrat. Two other hill systems are the Tyrrhenian Anti-Apennine, which extends from the Colline Metallifere of Tuscany to Vesuvius and the Beneventane Hills in Campania, and the Adriatic Anti-Apennine, present in Puglia with the Murge and Gargano hills.

The Italian hills have different origins:

- The Langhe, Monferrato, Chianti and Murge are sedimentary hills formed by the lifting of the seabed.
- The Beneventane Hills are of tertiary formation, that is, composed of gravel stratifications or masses of pebbles mixed with limestone and sandstone, probably due to the raising of the lake bottom.
- The hills of Brianza, of Canavese and more generally of the entire strip that runs at the foot of the Alps are morainic, that is, made up of deposits of earth and crushed stone transported by ancient glaciers.
- The Euganean Hills and numerous other formations in Tuscany, Lazio, Campania are of volcanic origin, i.e. they are the remains of ancient extinct volcanoes, rounded by a long erosion.

=== Plains ===
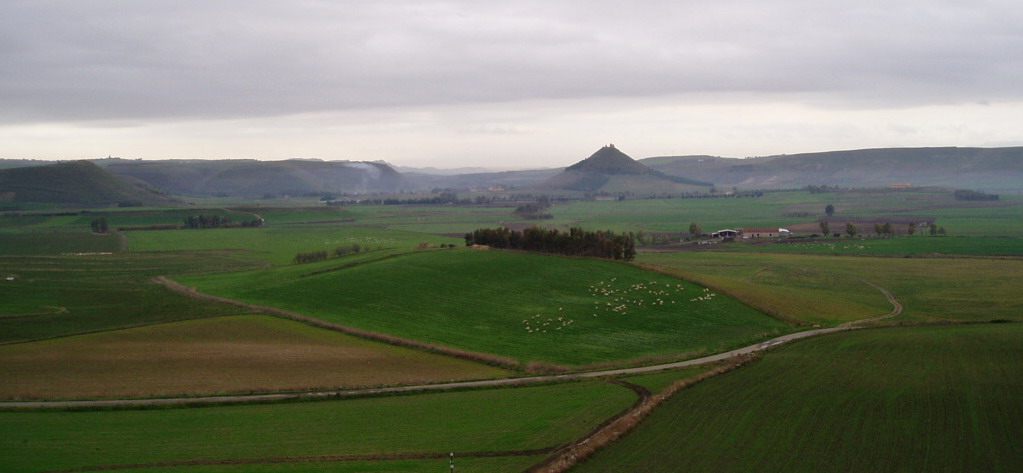
Plain of Campidano

The plains make up 23.2% of the Italian national territory. In between the two lies a large plain in the valley of the Po, the largest river in Italy, which flows 652 km (405 mi) eastward from the Cottian Alps to the Adriatic. The Po Valley is the largest plain in Italy, with 46,000 km^{2} (18,000 sq mi), and it represents over 70% of the total plain area in the country. The Po Valley is divided into two bands: the high plain, which borders the Alpine and Apennine hills, and the low plain located in the center and extended up to the Po delta.

In the peninsular part and in the islands there are only small plains often located along the coasts and at the mouth of the major rivers, near which they formed: this is the case, for example, of the Tavoliere delle Puglie, of the Campidano in Sardinia or the Maremma in Tuscany.

The Italian plains have different origins:

- Most of it is of alluvial origin, that is, formed by the debris deposited by the rivers along their course. The Po Valley, Valdarno, Pontine Marshes, Campidano, Metapontino, Plain of Sele, Salento, Plain of Sibari, Plain of Catania and Plain of Sant'Eufemia are alluvial.
- The second largest Italian plain is the Tavoliere delle Puglie, which is a rising plain, formed from the raising of the seabed.
- Other plains, for example the Plain of Campania, are of volcanic origin where the ashes of the volcanoes have filled the surrounding valleys, transforming them into fertile plains.

== Hydrography ==
Italy is surrounded, except to the north, by the sea, and its territory has a rich reserve of inland waters (rivers and lakes). The southern regions, however, are drier than the northern ones, due to the scarcity of rains and the absence of glaciers that can feed the rivers.

=== Rivers ===
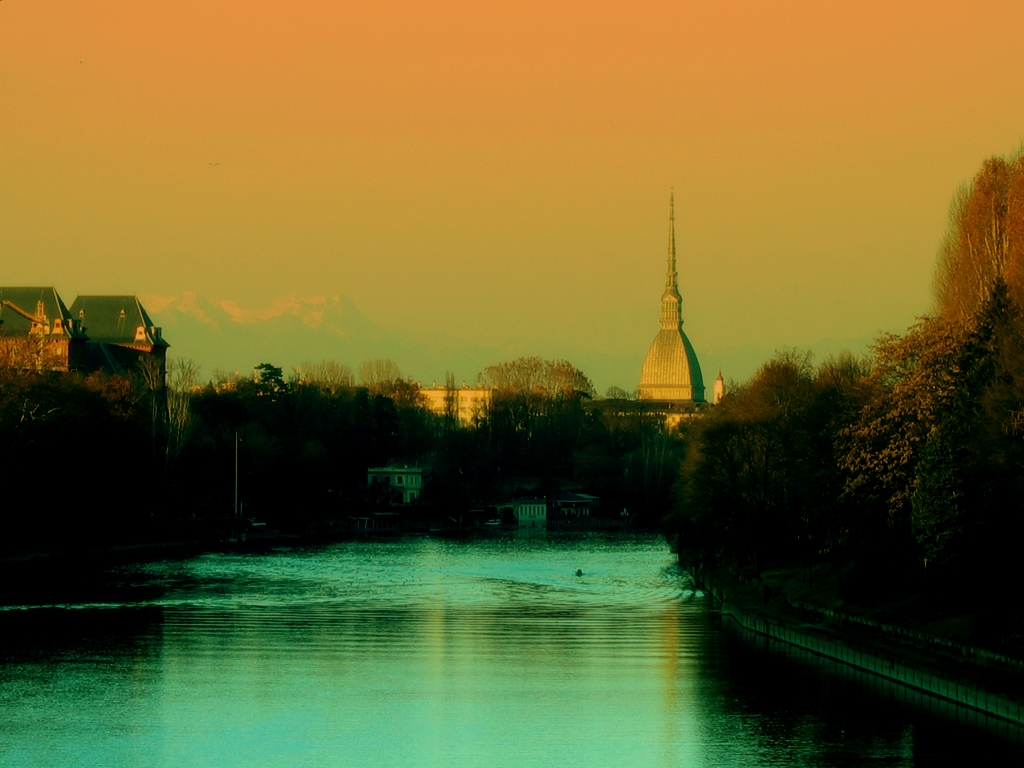
The Po river in Turin

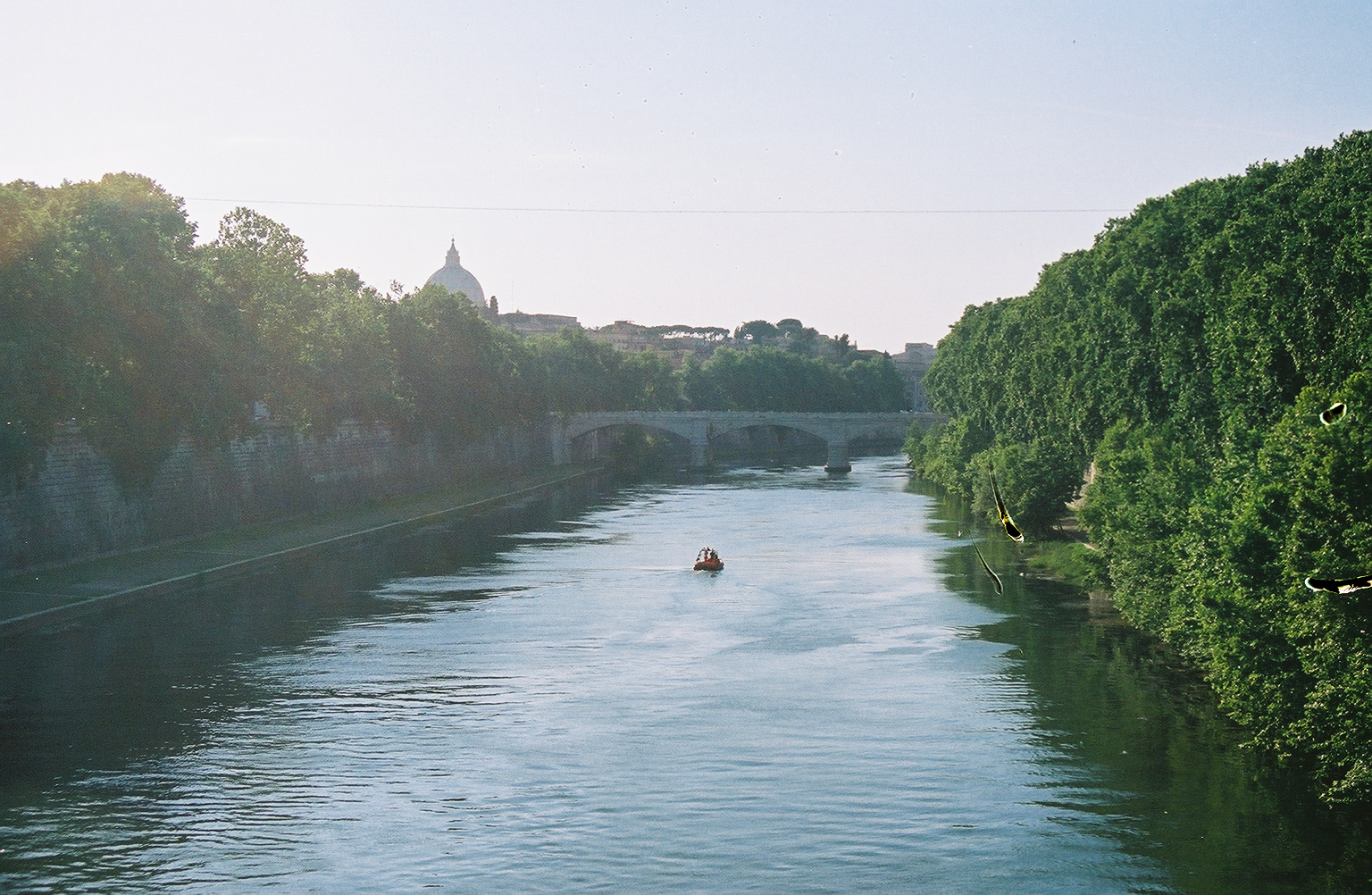
The Tiber river in Rome

Italian rivers are shorter than those of other European regions due to the Apennines that run along the entire length of the peninsula, dividing the waters into two opposite sides. They are numerous however, due to the relative abundance of rains in Italy in general, and to the presence of the Alpine chain, rich in snowfields and glaciers, in northern Italy.

The fundamental watershed follows the ridge of the Alps and the Apennines and defines five main slopes, corresponding to the seas into which the rivers flow: the Adriatic, Ionic, Tyrrhenian, Ligurian and Mediterranean sides. Italian rivers are categorized into two main groups: the Alpine-Po river rivers and the Apennine-island rivers.

The longest Italian river is the Po (652 km or 405 mi), which flows from the Monviso, runs through the entire Po Valley from west to east, and then flows, with a delta, into the Adriatic Sea. In addition to being the longest, it is also the river with the largest basin and the largest flow at its mouth. The second longest Italian river is the Adige (410 km or 250 mi), which originates near Lake Resia and flows into the Adriatic Sea, after having made a north–south route, near Chioggia. The third longest river in Italy is the Tiber (405 km or 252 mi), the second longest Italian river in terms of hydrographic basin; it was formed on Monte Fumaiolo (in Emilia-Romagna) and flows into the Tyrrhenian Sea after having crossed the center of Rome. After the Tiber, in order of length are the rivers Adda (313 km or 194 mi), Oglio (280 km or 170 mi), Tanaro (276 km or 171 mi) and Ticino (248 km (154 mi), of which 157 km (98 mi) is in Italy).

Most of Italy's rivers drain either into the Adriatic Sea (such as Po, Piave, Adige, Brenta, Tagliamento, Reno) or into the Tyrrhenian (like Arno, Tiber and Volturno), though the waters from some border municipalities drain into the Black Sea through the basin of the Drava (Innichen and Sexten in Trentino-Alto Adige/Südtirol, Tarvisio in Friuli-Venezia Giulia) or the Inn (Livigno in Lombardy), both tributaries of the Danube, and the waters from the Lago di Lei in Lombardy drain into the North Sea through the basin of Rhine.

=== Lakes ===
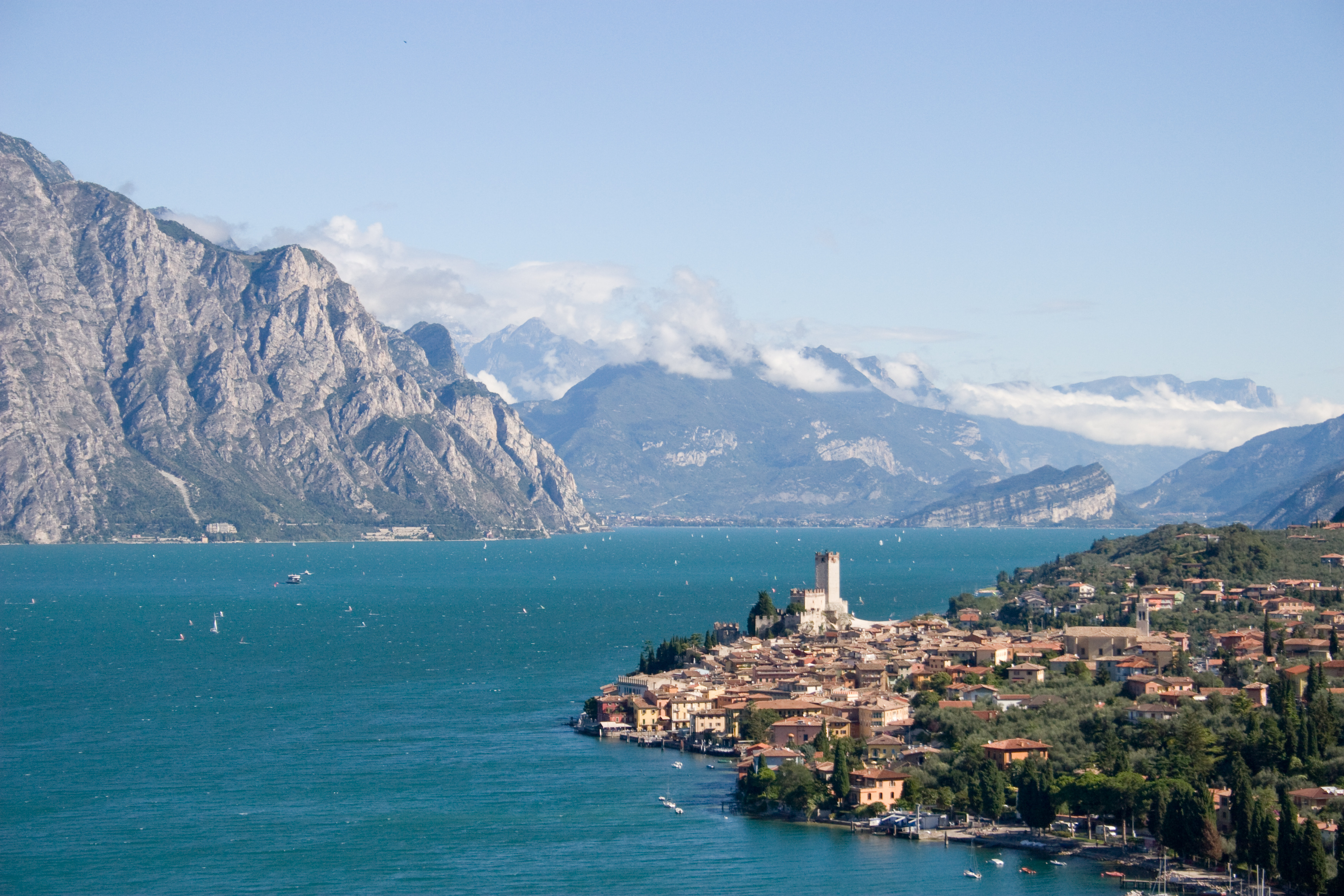
Lake Garda is the largest of the Italian lakes

In Italy there are more than 1,000 lakes, mostly artificially created by the damming of river valleys.

In the north of the country are a number of subalpine moraine-dammed lakes (the Italian Lakes), including the largest in Italy, the Garda (370 km^{2} or 143 sq mi). Other well known of these subalpine lakes are Lake Maggiore (212.5 km^{2} or 82 sq mi), whose most northerly section is part of Switzerland, Como (which holds the record of depth in the Italian Republic, which amounts to 410 m or 1,350 ft) (146 km^{2} or 56 sq mi), Orta, Lugano, Iseo, Idro. These lakes occupy wide valleys carved by ancient glaciers.

In Italy there are also coastal lakes, such as Lake Lesina, separated from the sea by a narrow strip of land, and volcanic lakes (Lake Bolsena, Lake Vico, Lake Bracciano), which occupy the craters of extinct volcanoes. Lake Trasimeno, on the other hand, formed in a hollow in the territory. Other notable lakes in the Italian peninsula are Varano and Omodeo in Sardinia.

The swamps and ponds that in the past covered vast flat areas of Italy, in recent centuries have been largely dried up; the few remaining wetlands, such as the Valli di Comacchio in Emilia-Romagna or the Stagno di Cagliari in Sardinia, are protected as very precious natural environments.

Along the Italian coasts there are lagoons, among which the Venetian Lagoon, that of Grado Lagoon and that of Marano Lagoon in the northern Adriatic stand out for their size and importance, and the Orbetello Lagoon on the Tuscan coast.

=== Seas and coasts ===
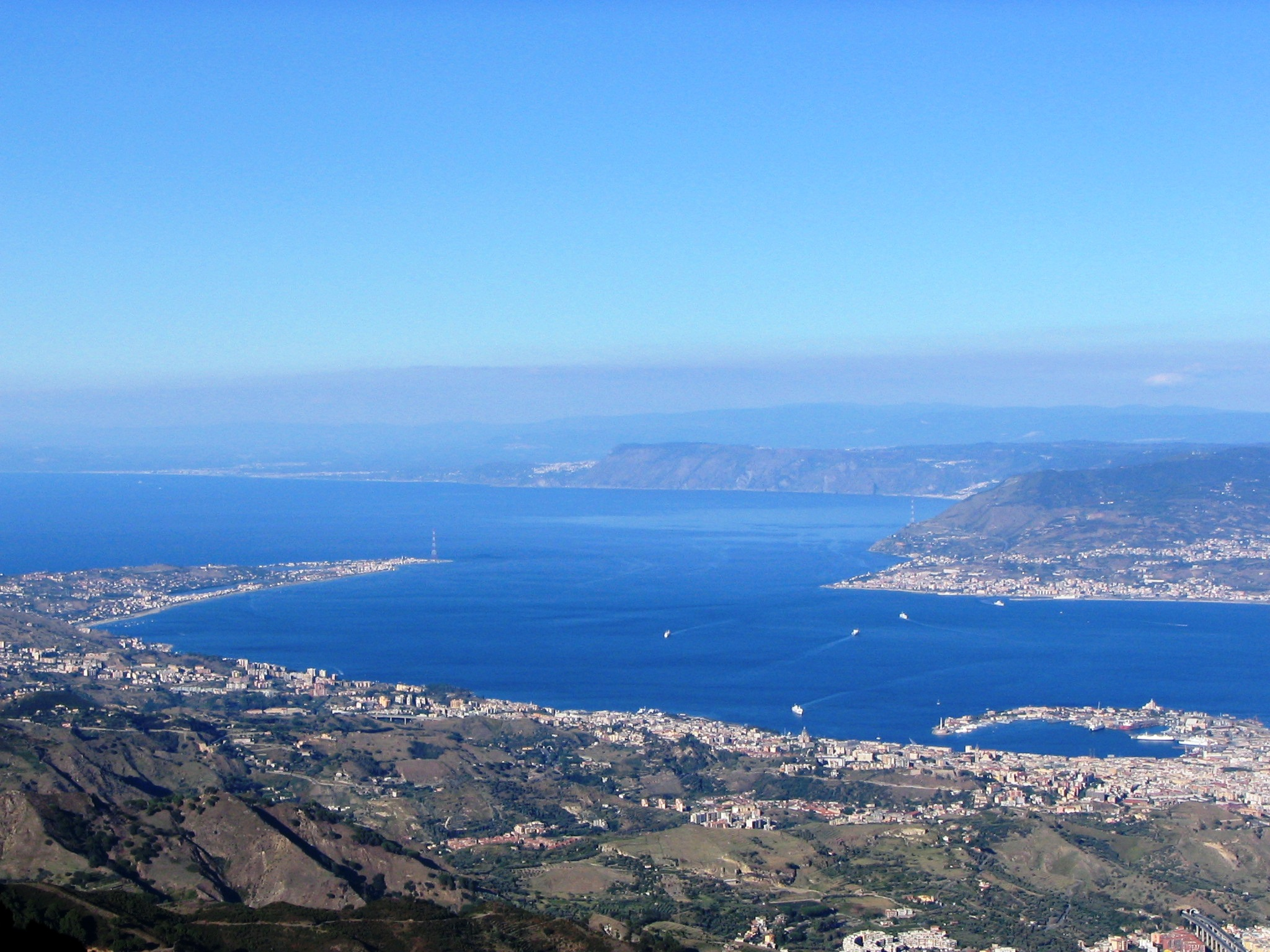
View of the Strait of Messina

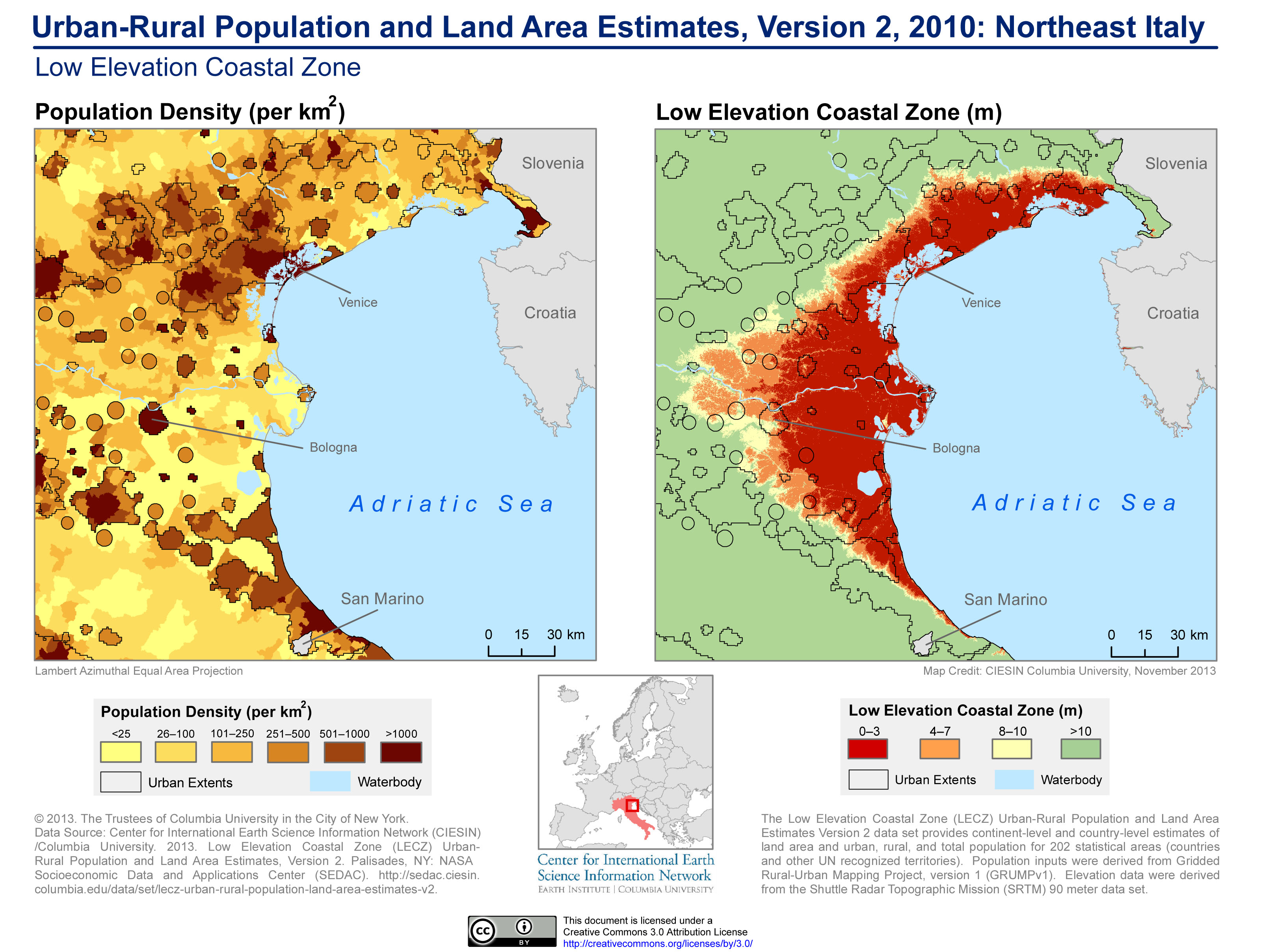
Population density (left) and elevation above sea level (right) in Veneto (2010). Veneto is particularly vulnerable to rising sea level.

The Italian Peninsula overlooks the Mediterranean Sea, which around it is divided into various seas.

The Ligurian Sea bathes the coasts of Liguria and, according to the cartography of the Hydrographic Institute of the Navy, the northern Tuscan coasts to the south as far as the island of Elba.

The Tyrrhenian Sea bathes the western coasts of the peninsula south of the island of Elba (and therefore all the regions from Tuscany to Calabria), the northern coasts of Sicily and the eastern coasts of Sardinia.

The Adriatic Sea bathes the eastern coasts of the peninsula, from Friuli-Venezia Giulia to the Cape of Santa Maria di Leuca, Apulia.

The Ionian Sea extends to the eastern coasts of Sicily and Calabria, the coast of Basilicata and the western coasts of Apulia.

To the south of Sicily lies the Strait of Sicily, while to the west of Sardinia lies the Sea of Sardinia.

Italy has a coastline of approximately 7,900 km (4,900 mi), with a great variety of shapes that depends both on the nature of the mainland and on the action of the sea.

The Adriatic coasts are quite straight, characterized to the north by the gulfs of Trieste and Venice, in the center by the Conero promontory, to the south by that of the Gargano, which forms the Gulf of Manfredonia. The Adriatic coasts are low and sandy, with lagoons in the northern section. Only in the Trieste area, in correspondence with the Gargano, the Conero and the lower eastern Salento (between Otranto and Santa Maria di Leuca) do rocky sections follow one another.

The Ionian coasts are mainly low and sandy and are characterized by the wide Gulf of Taranto, closed to the east by the Salento Peninsula (which divides it from the Adriatic) and to the west by the Calabrian peninsula (which divides it from the Tyrrhenian Sea).

The Strait of Messina connects the Ionian and the Tyrrhenian seas.

The Tyrrhenian coasts are very articulated, with rocky stretches alternating with sandy beaches, with numerous gulfs and headlands. Among the many gulfs include Naples, Salerno and Gaeta, between the peninsulas that of Sorrento and the promontories that of Circeo and that of Piombino. In the Tyrrhenian Sea, there are three important channels: between the island of Elba and the Tuscan coast the Strait of Piombino, between Elba and Corsica the Strait of Corsica, and between Sardinia and Corsica the Strait of Bonifacio.

The Ligurian Sea, which has the Gulf of Genoa at its center, has high and rocky coasts in the Riviera di Levante and mixed coasts in the Riviera di Ponente.

== Geology ==
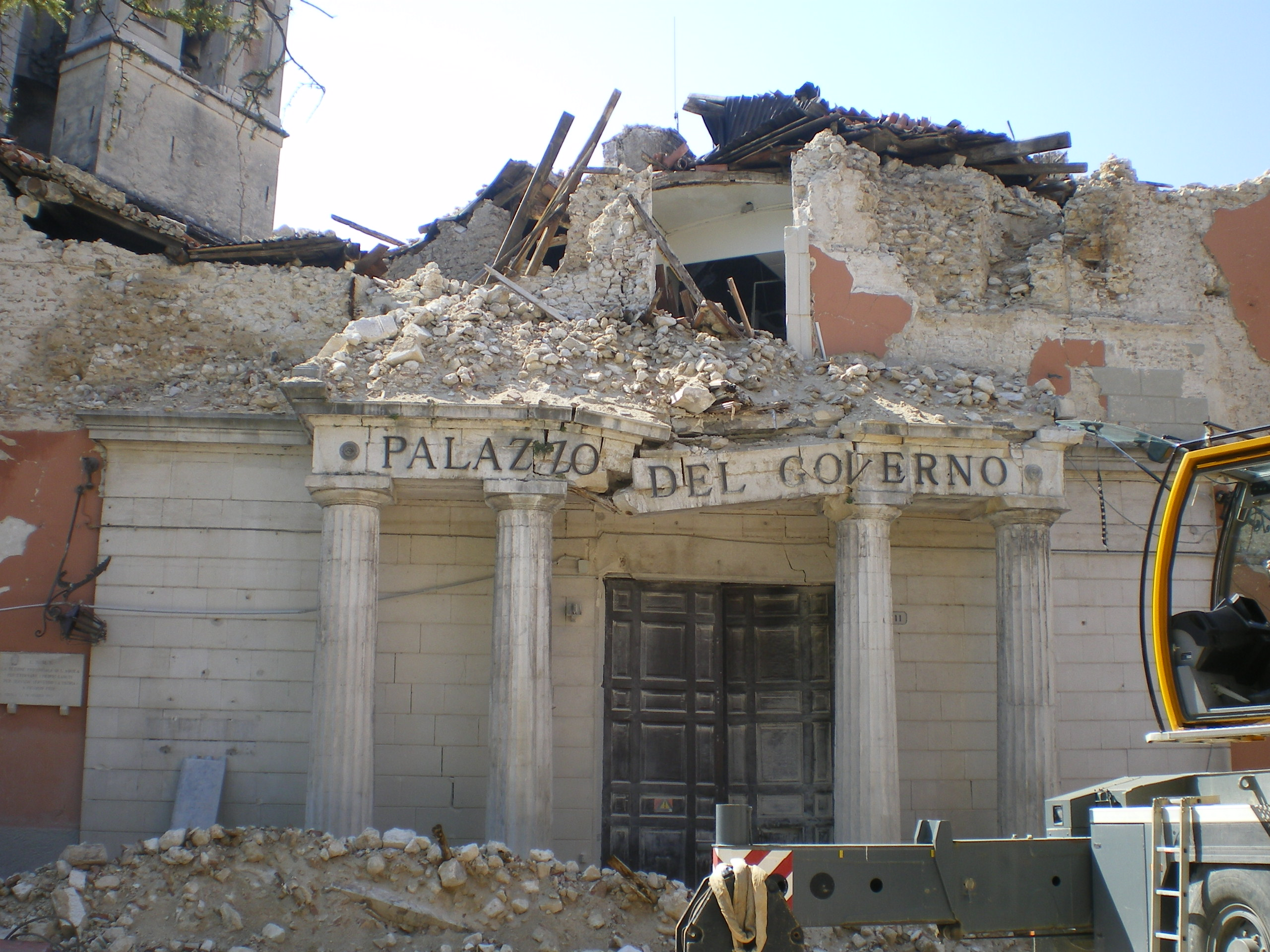
The prefecture of L'Aquila after the earthquake of 6 April 2009

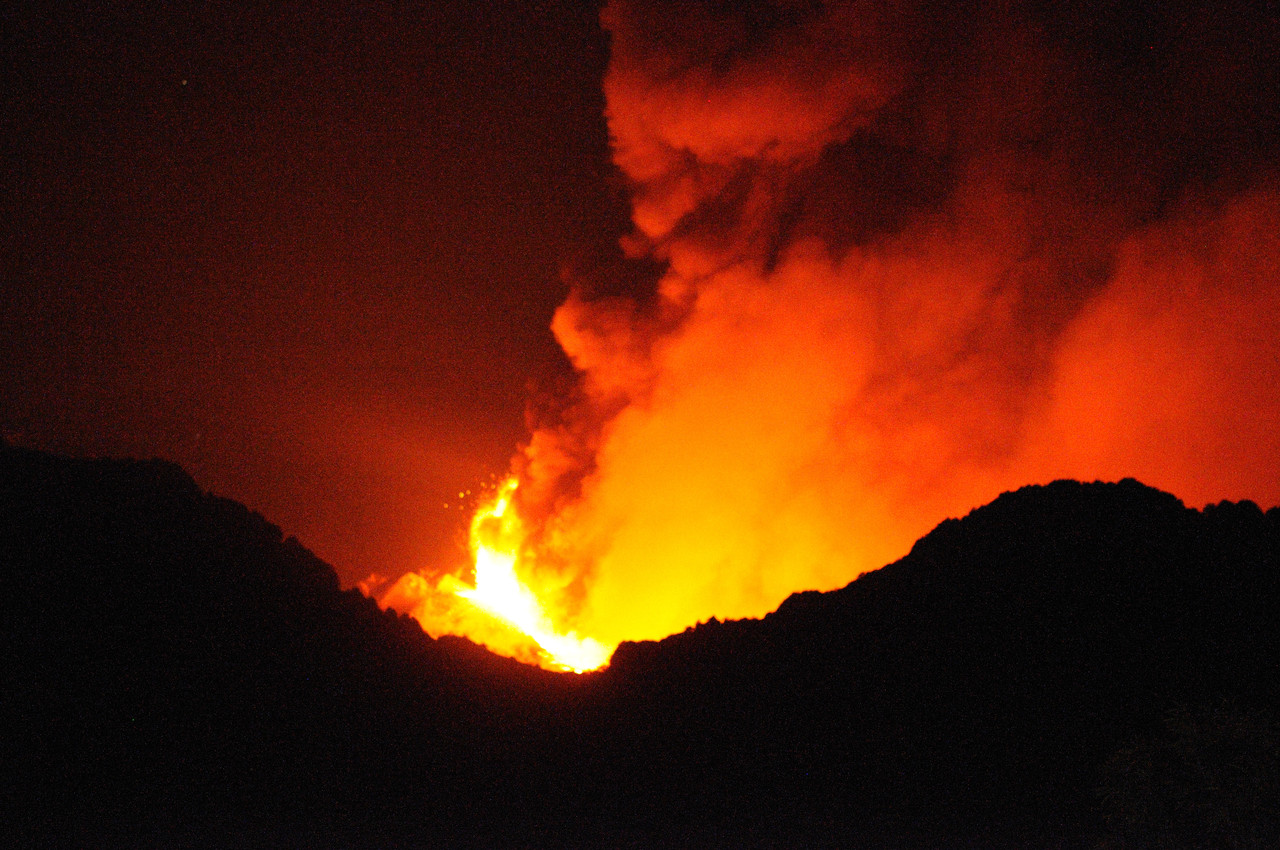
Etna eruption in 2011

The underground thrusts that millions of years ago gave rise to the reliefs of Italy still continue: the earthquakes and the eruptive activity of volcanoes testify to this.

=== Earthquakes ===
Squeezed between two plates, the African Plate and the Eurasian Plate, Italy is very subject to earthquakes, even intense ones, so much so that it holds the record in Europe. In particular, the areas at greatest seismic risk are the north and south-west of Sicily, the whole Apennines (but in particular the central-southern area), northern Apulia, almost all of Friuli-Venezia Giulia and finally the north-west of Veneto. On the contrary, the areas with little or no seismic risk are the Alps (excluding the extreme western and eastern area), most of the Po Valley, the Tyrrhenian coasts up to Lazio, central-southern Apulia, Sardinia and central Sicily.

=== Volcanoes ===
Italy is also known for the presence of numerous volcanoes, the most well-known being Vesuvius near Naples, Etna near Catania (which with its 3,343 m (10,968 ft) is the highest volcano in Europe), (Note: If the Caucasus Mountains is considered outside the natural borders of the European continent, Etna appears to be the highest volcano in Europe; including the Caucasus, Etna still remains the continent's highest active volcano.) Stromboli and Vulcano, in the Aeolian Islands in the province of Messina, in addition to the large caldera formed by the Campi Flegrei in Campania.

The peninsula also has many extinct volcanoes, that is, which have ceased their eruptive activity, such as the Euganean Hills in the province of Padua, Mount Amiata in Tuscany, the Berici Hills in the province of Vicenza and the Castelli Romani area, where there are several lakes that occupy the craters of ancient volcanoes. The lakes of Bracciano, Vico and Bolsena in northern Lazio also had a similar origin.

In recent years, numerous studies have also been conducted to better understand the structure and destructive potential of the submarine volcano Marsili, located about 140 km (87 mi) north of Sicily and about 150 km (93 mi) west of Calabria. With its 70 km (43 mi) of length and 30 km (19 mi) of width (equal to 2,100 km^{2} (810 sq mi) of surface) the Marsili is one of the largest volcanoes in Europe.

Many elements of the Italian territory are of volcanic origin. Most of the small islands and archipelagos in the south, like Capraia, Ponza, Ischia, Eolie, Ustica and Pantelleria are volcanic islands.

== Gallery ==
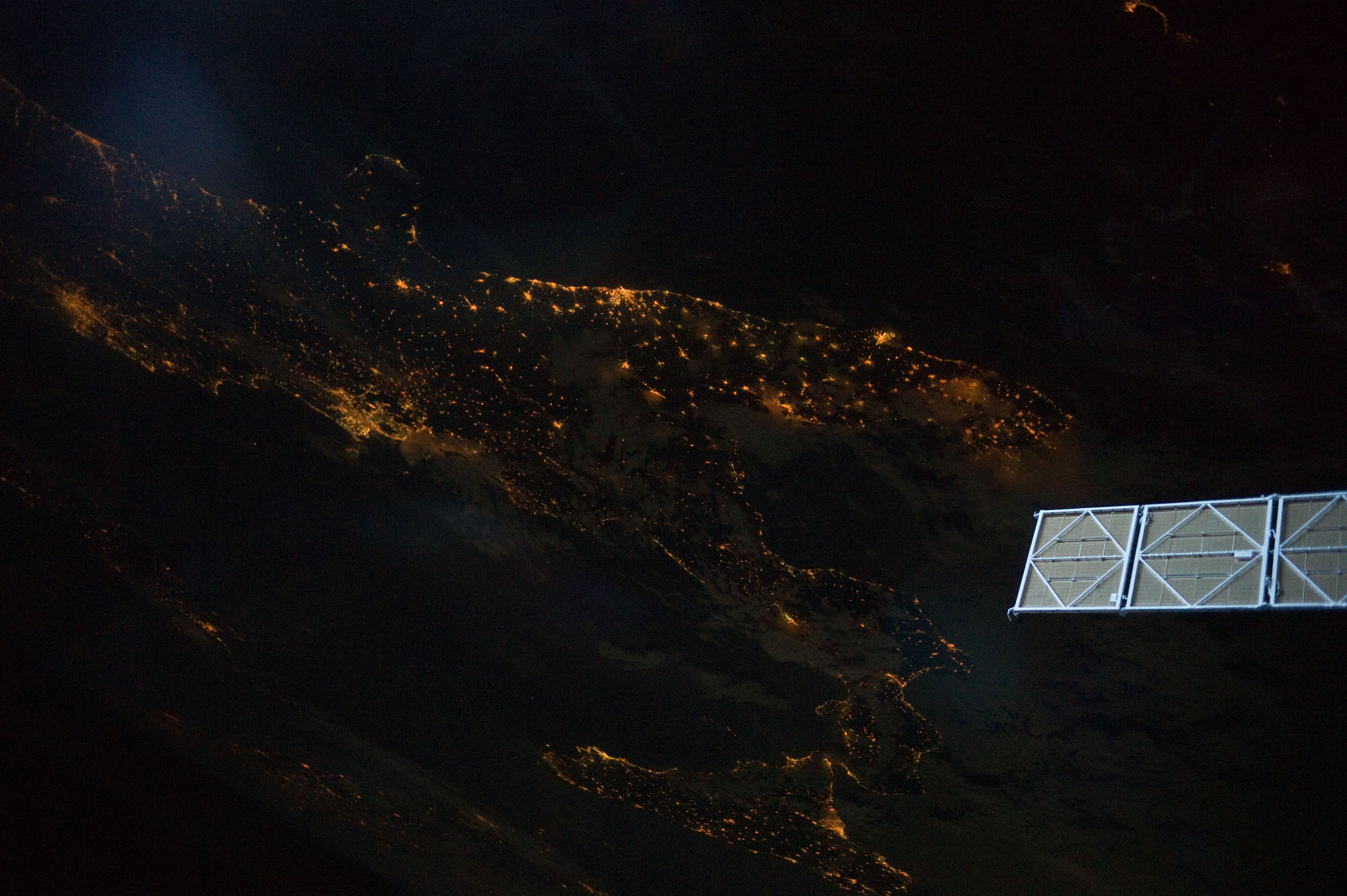
Astronaut photograph highlighting the night-time appearance of southern Italy.

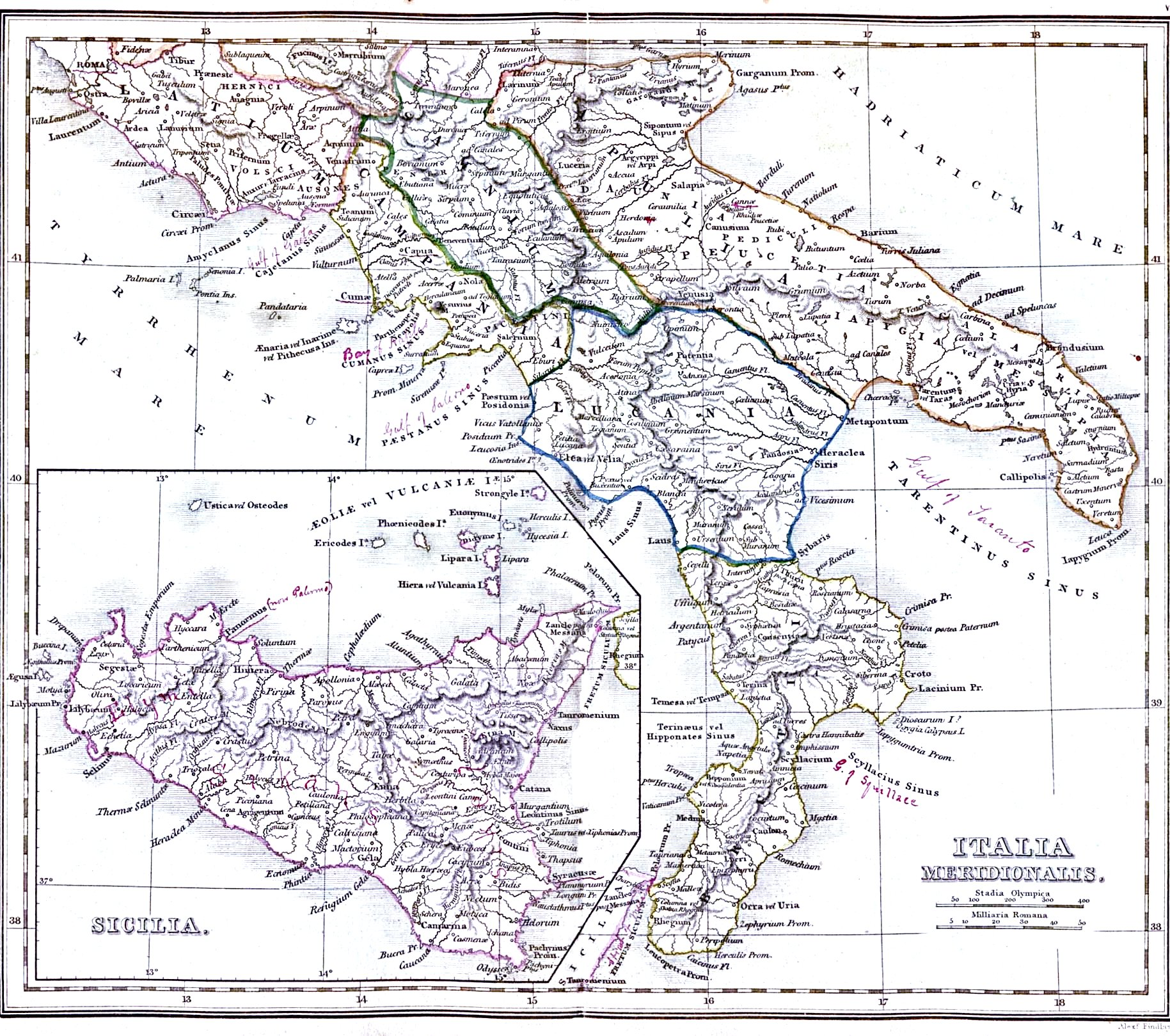
Southern Italy and Sicily on the 1849 map.

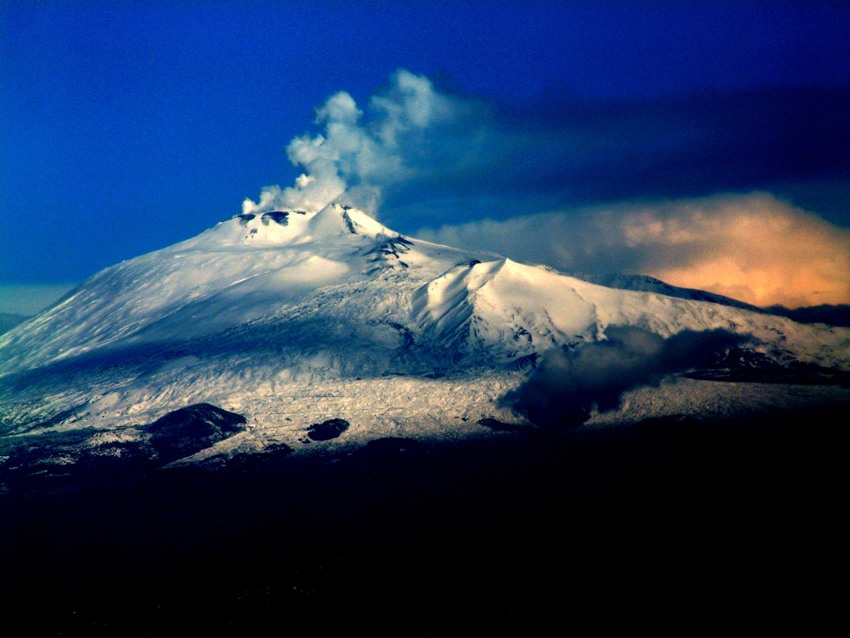
Etna, the highest active volcano in Europe.

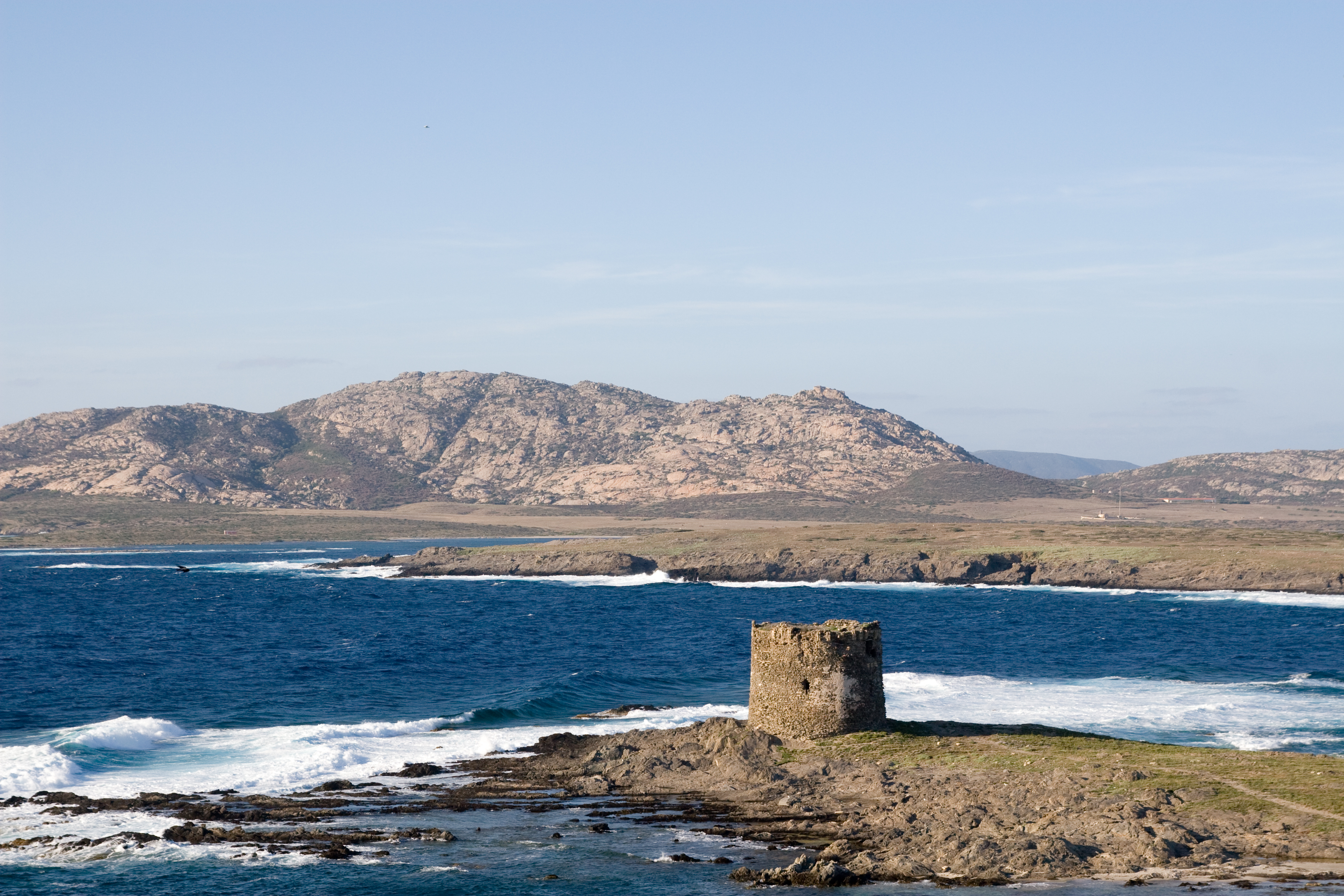
Asinara island with the Aragonese Torre della Pelosa (16th century), Sardinia.

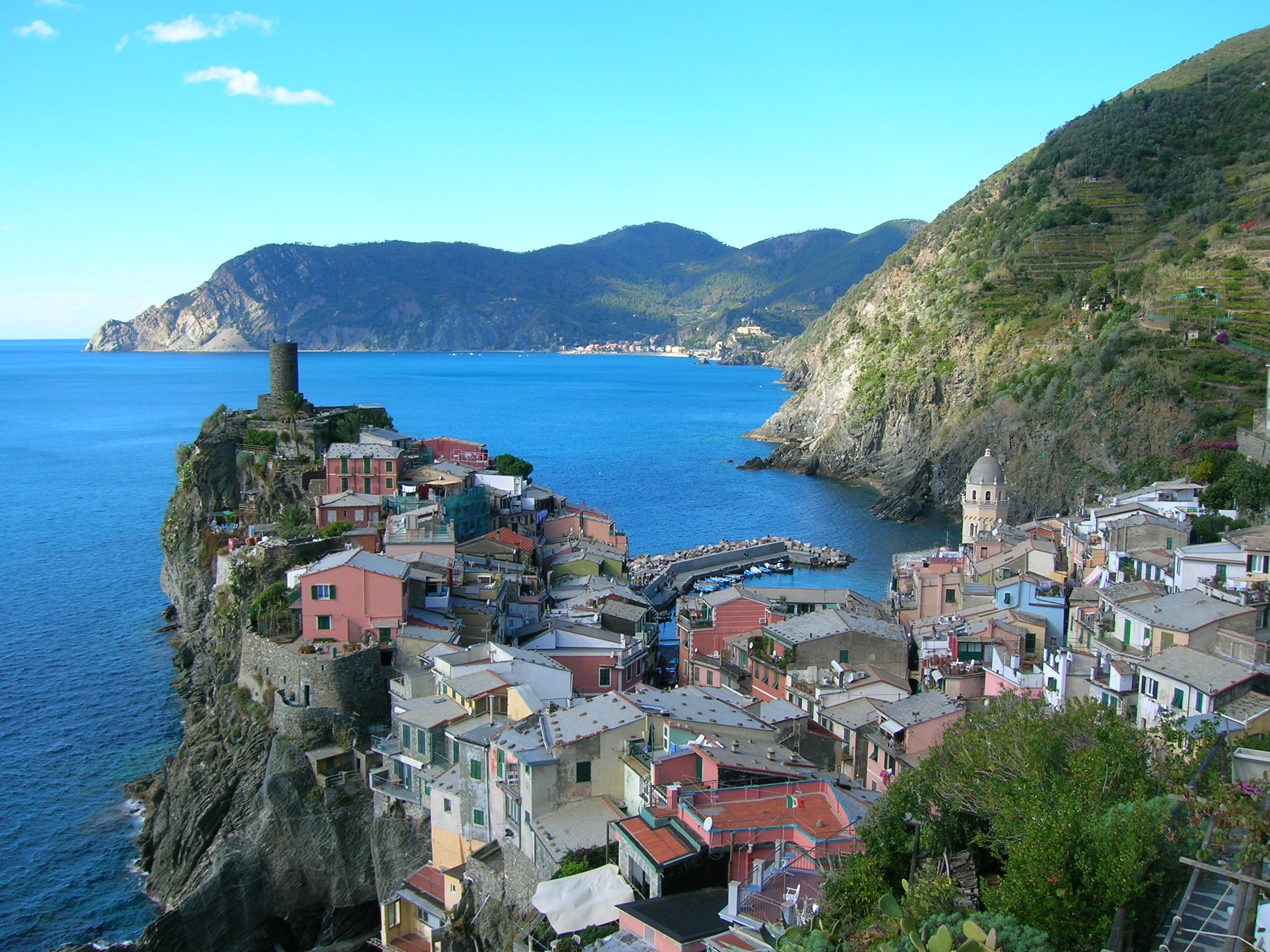
The coastal areas of Liguria have a Mediterranean climate.

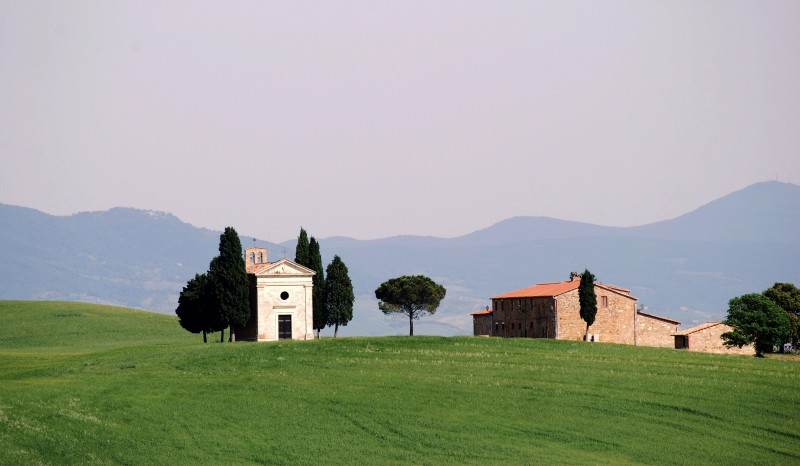
Landscape of Tuscany.

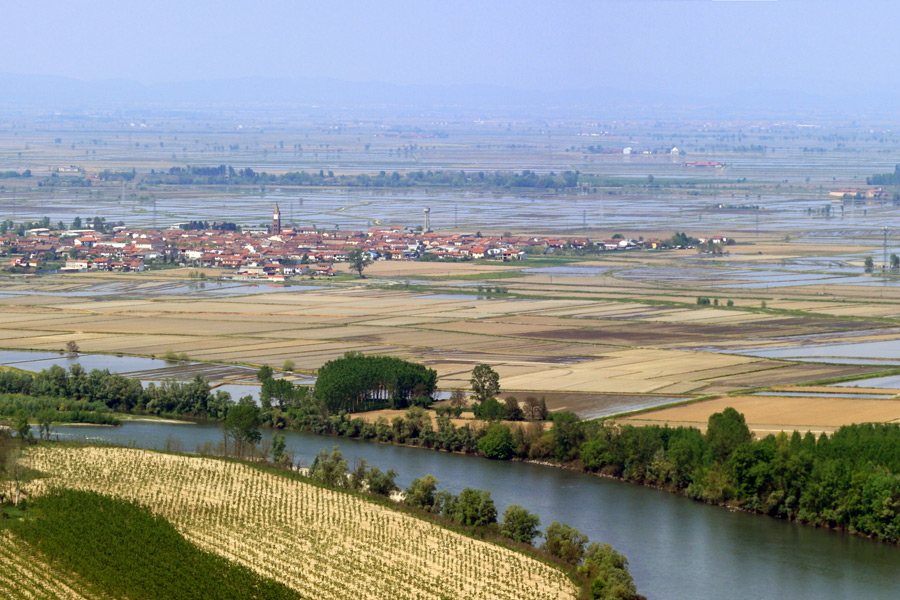
Rice paddies in the Po Valley near Vercelli.

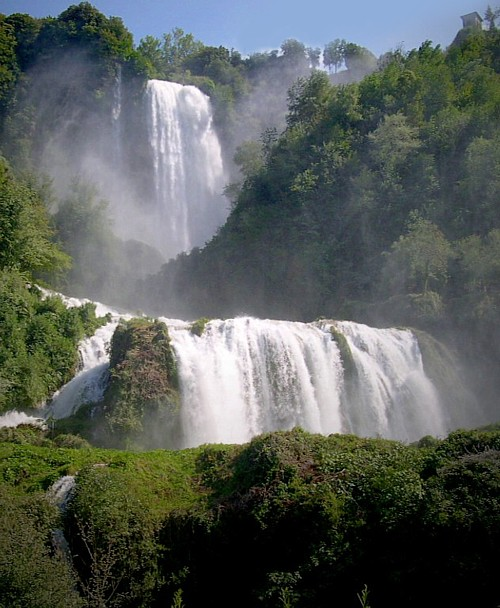
Marmore waterfall, the world's tallest man-made waterfall, was created by the ancient Romans.

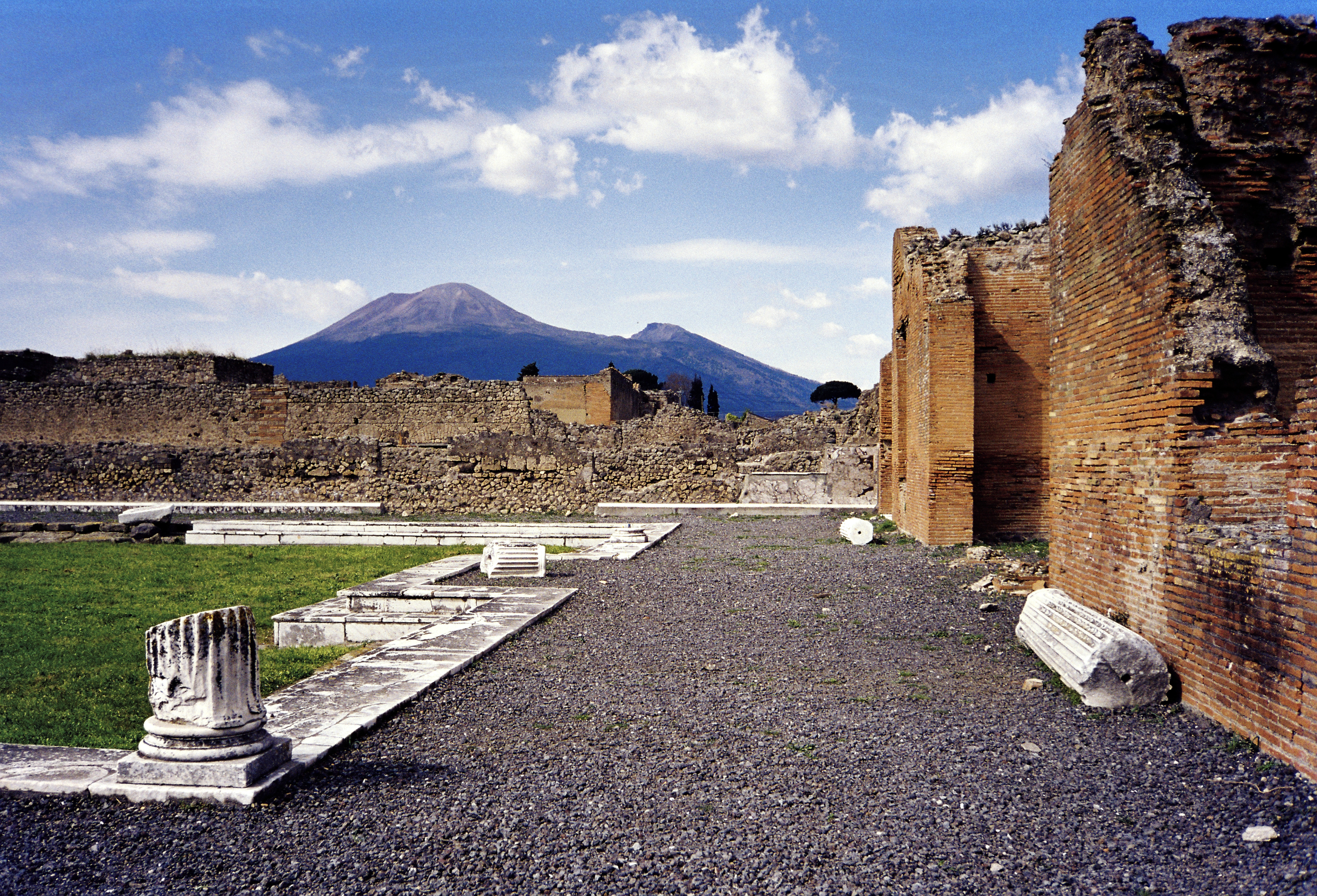
Mount Vesuvius looms over the ruins of Pompeii.

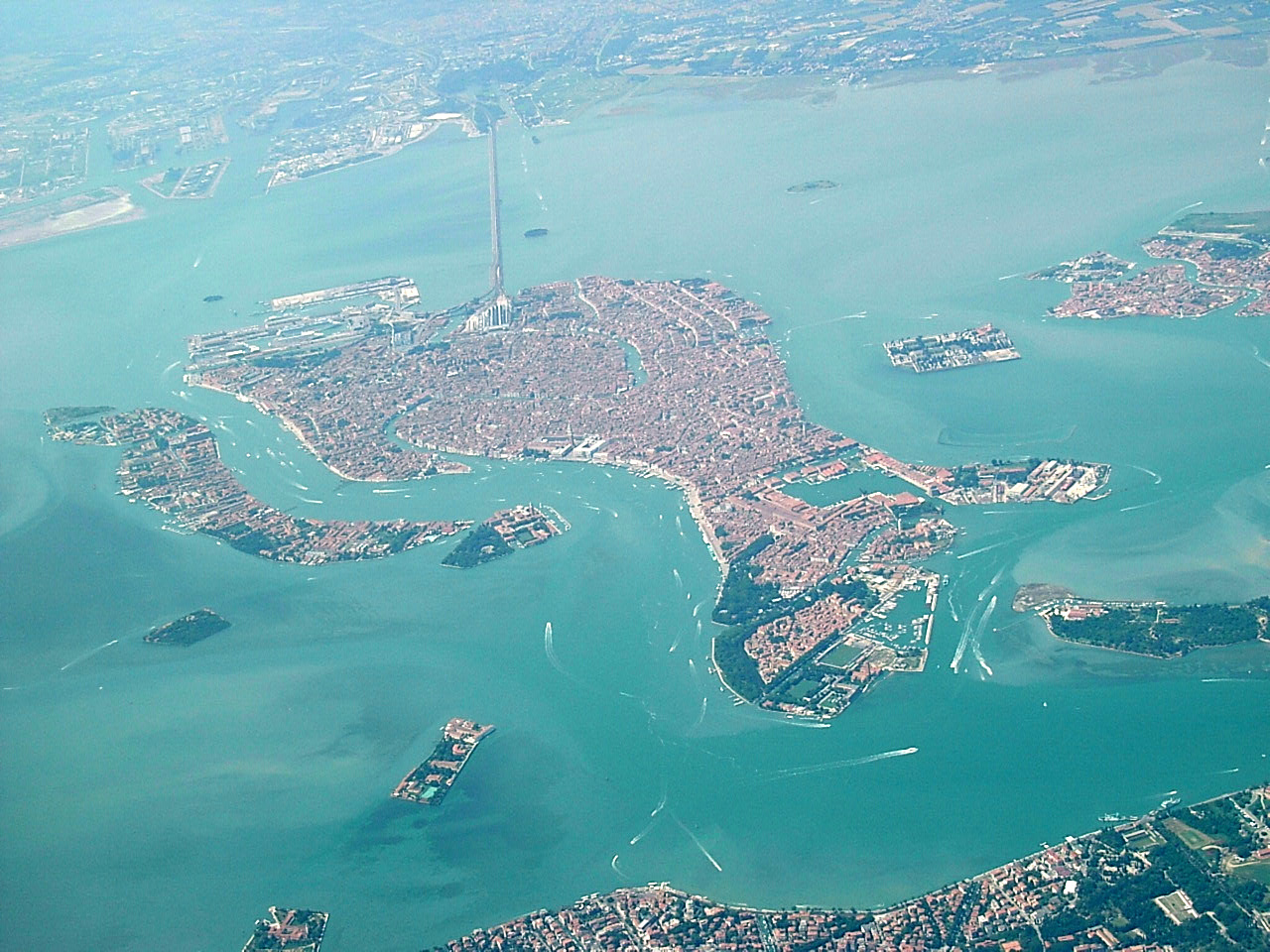
Panorama of Venice and its lagoon.

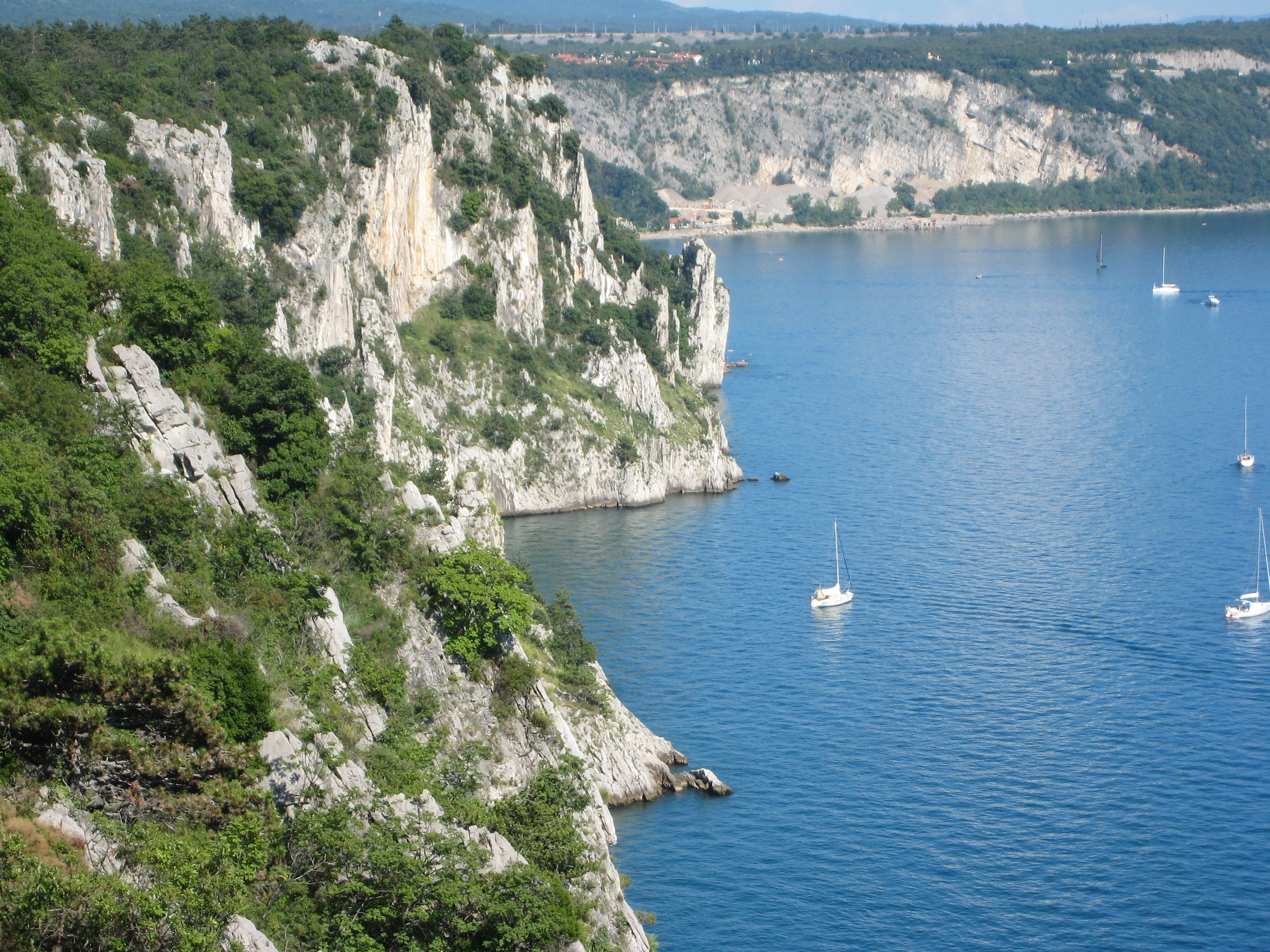
The Karst Plateau drops vertically into the Adriatic Sea near Trieste.

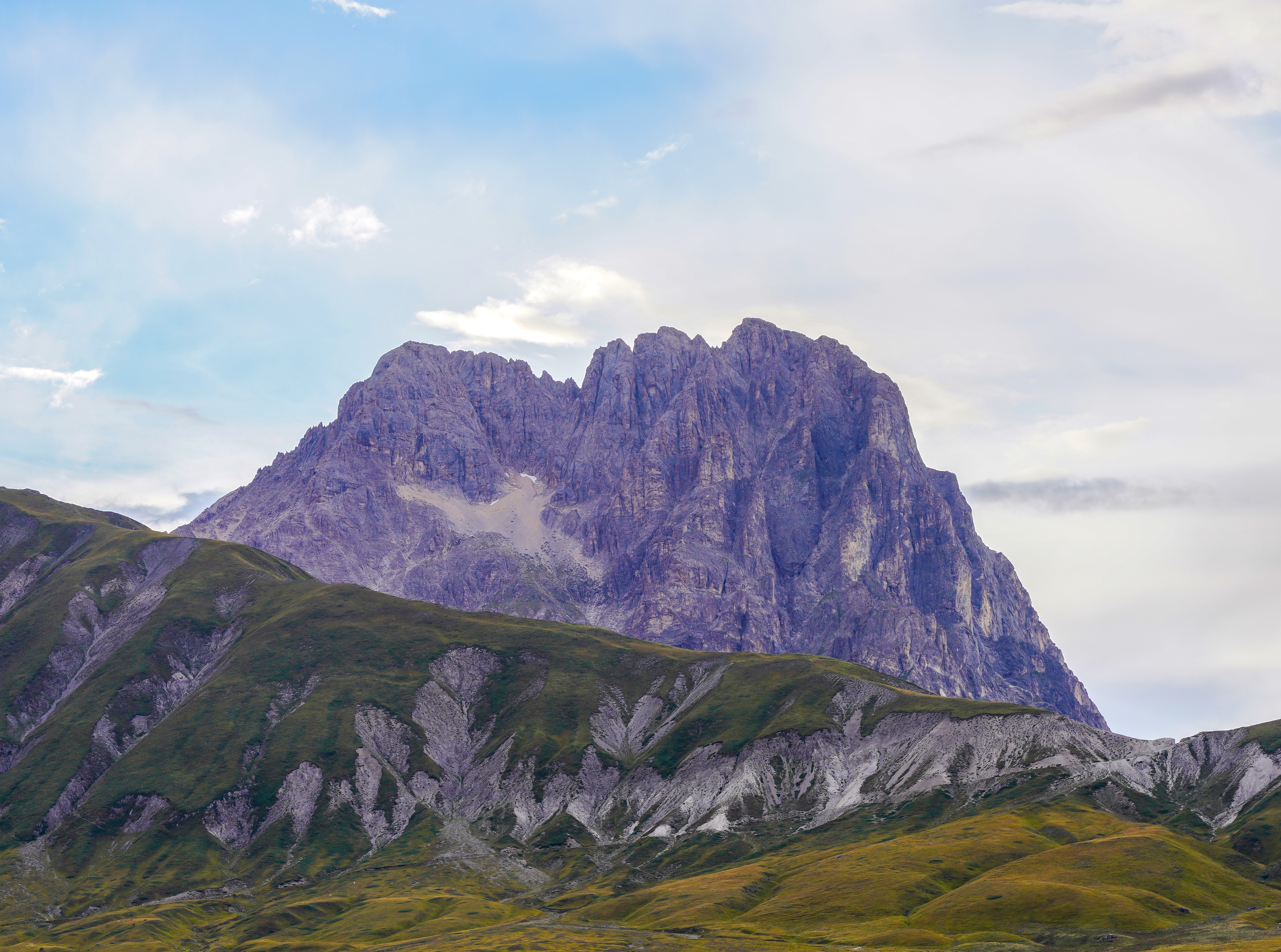
Gran Sasso d'Italia, the highest peak of the Apennines.

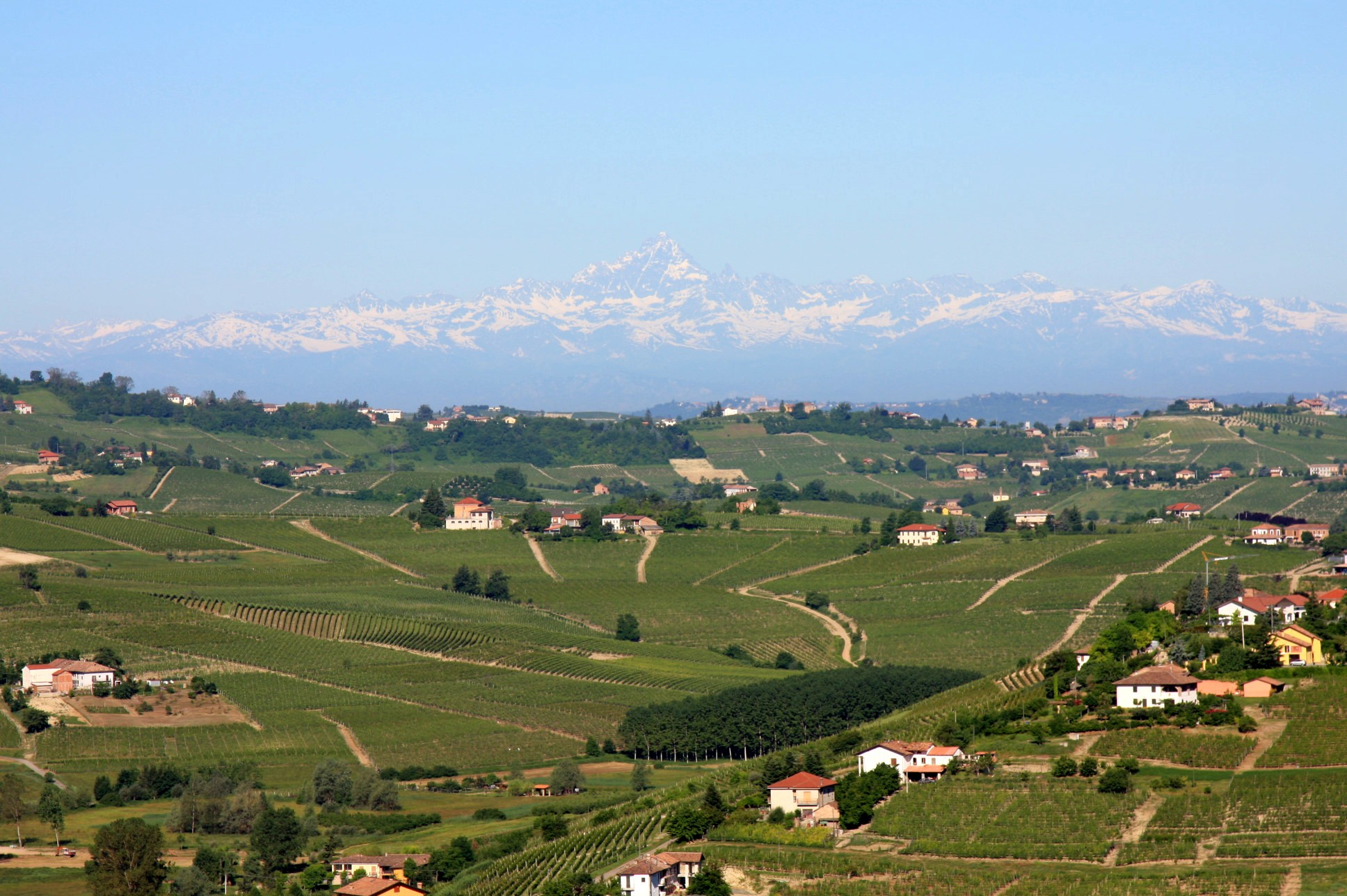
Vineyards in the Montferrat hills, with the Monviso in the background.

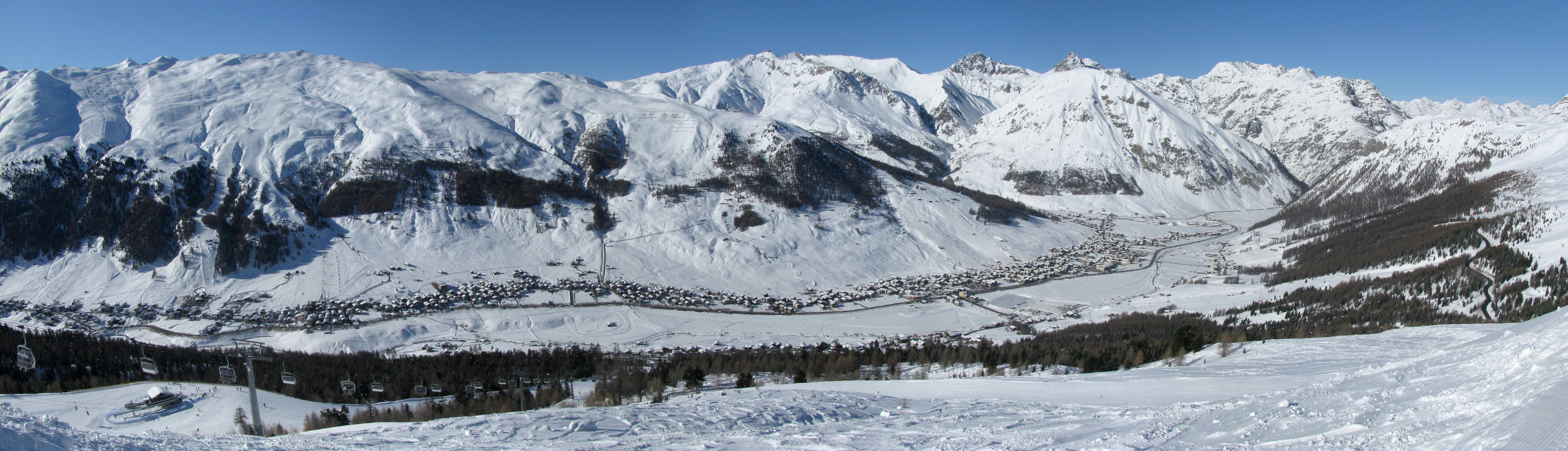
Livigno, the highest comune in Italy, during winter.

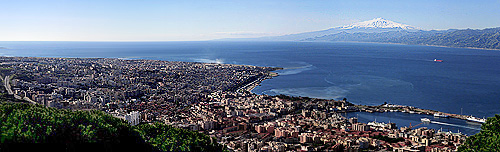
The Strait of Messina as seen from the mainland.

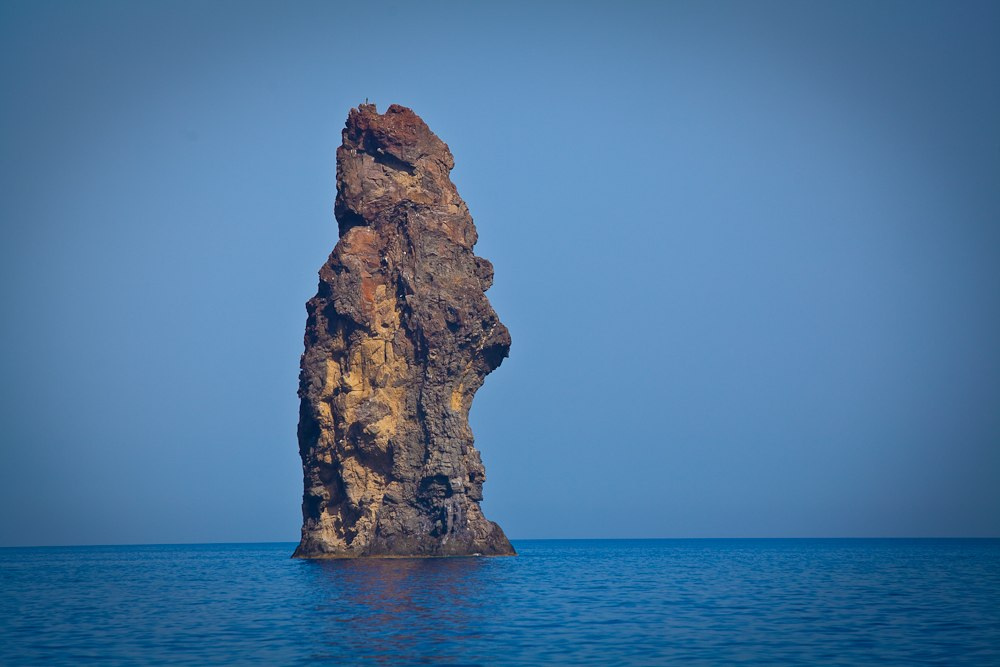
La Canna rock off the coast of Filicudi.

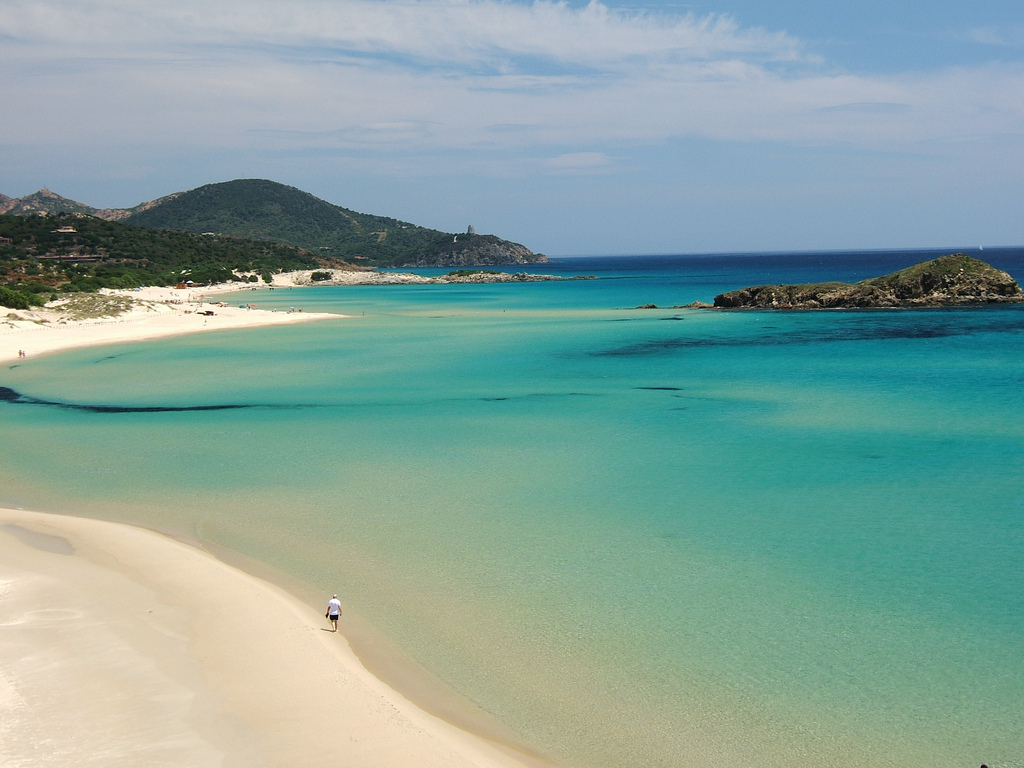
Southern coast of Sardinia.

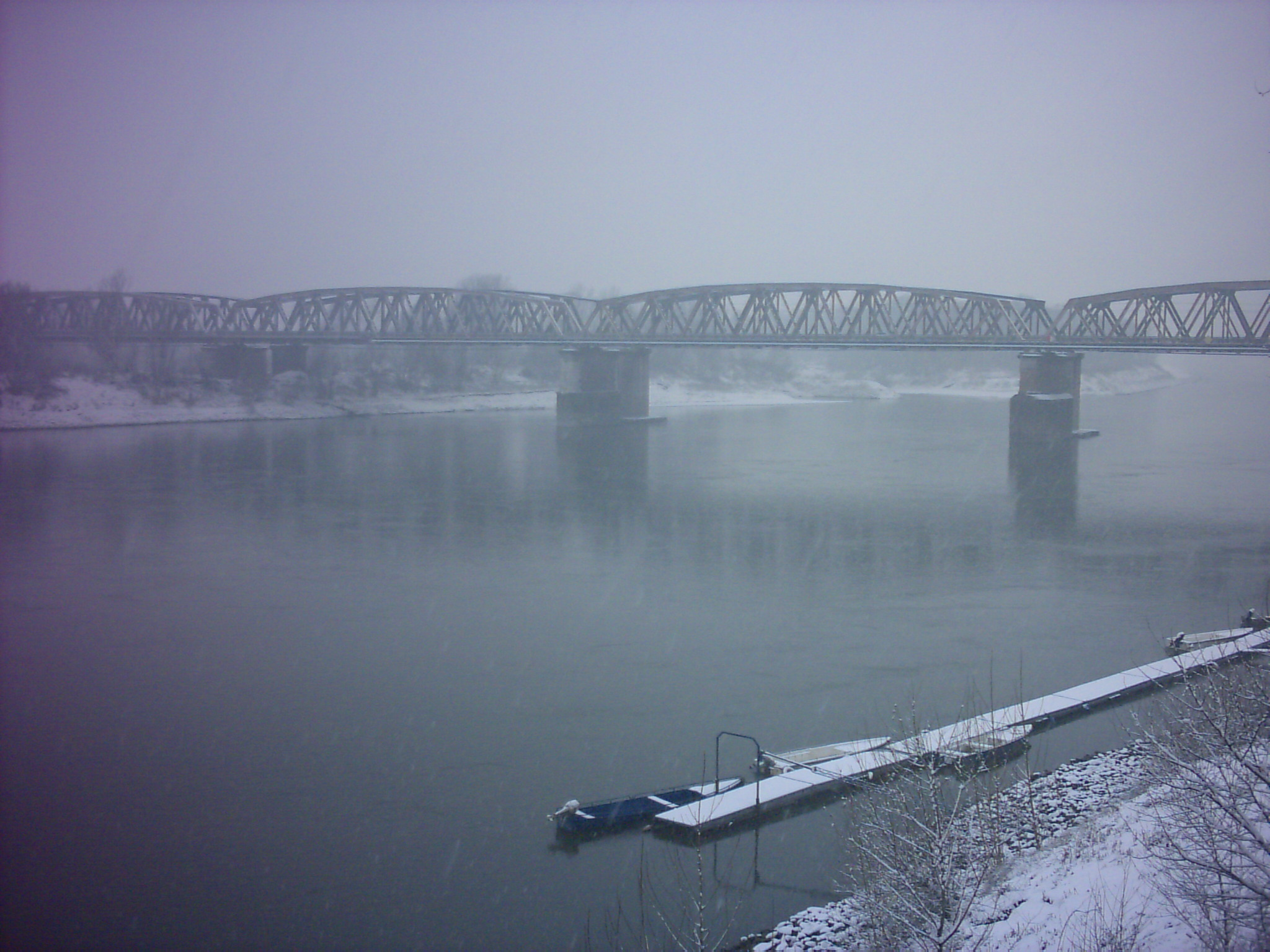
The Po river as seen in Cremona, on a foggy winter day.

== See also ==
- Climate of Italy
- Italy (geographical region)
- List of islands of Italy
- Natural hazards in Italy
