= Natural hazards in Italy =

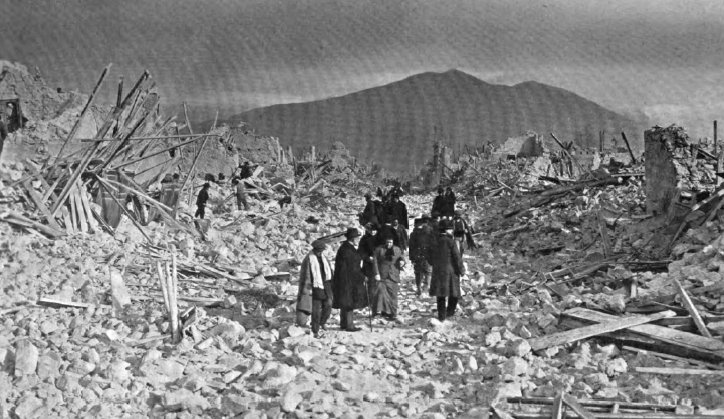
Ruins of the 1915 Avezzano earthquake

According to The World Factbook, the main natural phenomena posing a threat in Italy at a regional level are landslides, mudflows, avalanches, earthquakes, volcanic eruptions, floods and, in Venice, subsidence.

== Landslides and mudflows ==
As released by the Italian Institute of Environmental Protection and Research (IIEPR), 2.2% of the Italian population lives in areas at high or very high risk from landslides, and 3.8% of buildings and 5.8% of cultural heritage sites are located in those places.

Between 1970 and 2019, landslides caused 1085 deaths, 10 missing people, and 1454 non-fatal injuries. The regions with the highest mortality rate in that period were Aosta Valley and Trentino-Alto Adige/Südtirol.

== Earthquakes ==
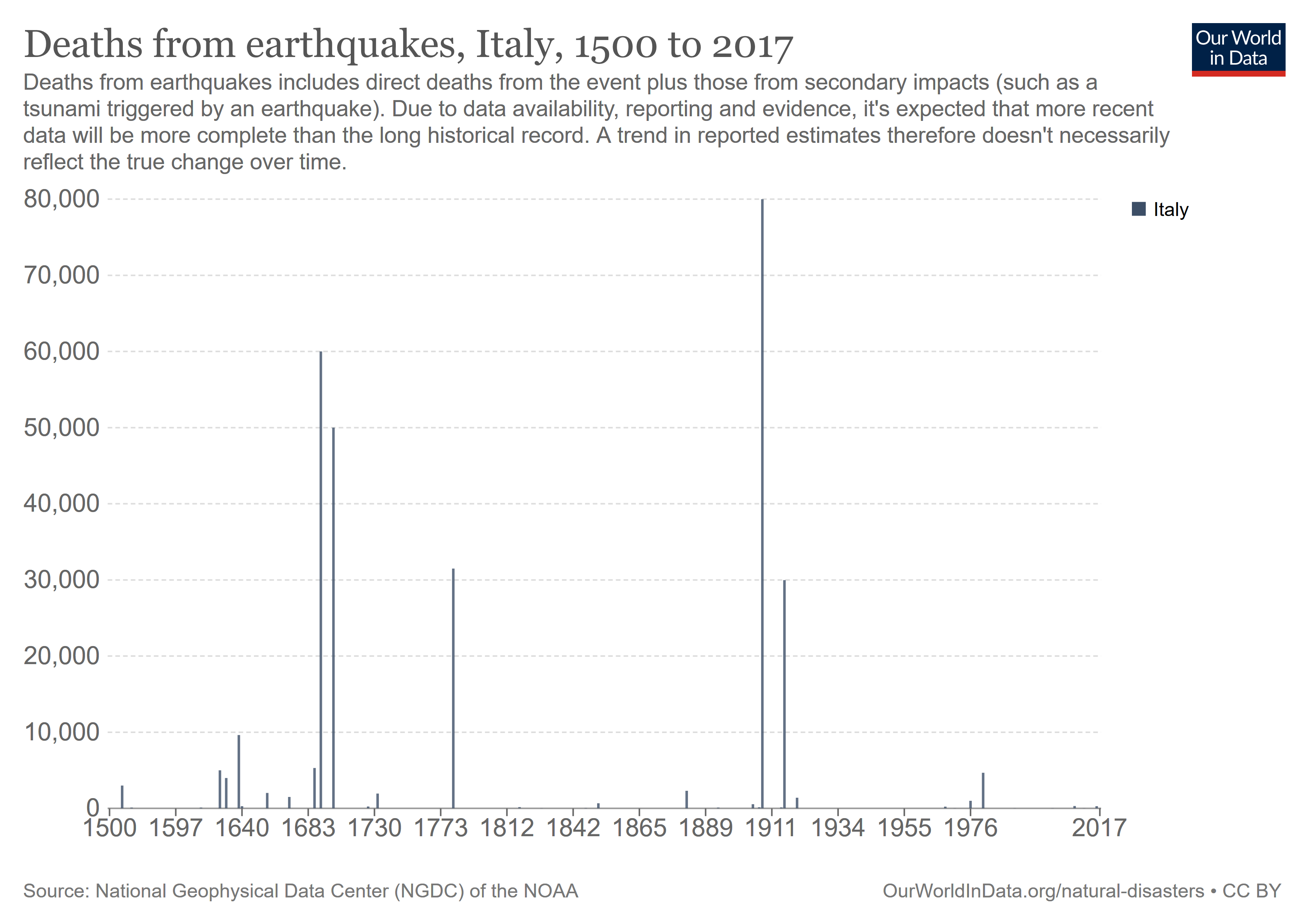
Graph of deaths from earthquakes in Italy from 1500 to 2017 in which the most destructive events in term of victims are 1693 Sicily earthquake, 1703 Apennine earthquakes, 1783 Calabrian earthquakes, 1908 Messina earthquake and 1915 Avezzano earthquake.

Being placed in the convergence between the Eurasian Plate and the African Plate, Italy (with the relative exception of Sardinia) suffers from seismicity, which is particularly high along the Apennine range, in Calabria, in Sicily and in some places of Northern Italy, such as Friuli, part of Veneto, and western Liguria. According to the Italian Civil Protection, the Italian seismic hazard is medium-high, while the vulnerability is very high also due to the fragility of the Italian building stock and the exposition is extremely high, as a consequence of the population density and the cultural heritage.

== Flooding ==
As released by the Italian Institute of Environmental Protection and Research (IIEPR), 10.4% of the Italian population lives in areas at high or very high risk from floods, and 9.3% of buildings and 15.3% of cultural heritage sites are located in those places.

Between 1970 and 2019, floods caused 585 deaths, 50 missing people, and 481 non-fatal injuries. The regions with the highest mortality rate in that period were Aosta Valley and Liguria.

== Volcanoes ==
The Italian authorities have classified the Italian volcanoes based on the time of the last eruption; besides submarine volcanoes and those considered extinct, in Italy there are dormant (Alban Hills, Phlegraean Fields, Ischia, Vesuvius, Lipari, Vulcano, Panarea, Pantelleria) and active volcanoes (Mount Etna and Stromboli).

== See also ==
- Geography of Italy
- List of earthquakes in Italy
- Bora (wind)
