= Punta Pesce Spada =

Southernmost point in Italy

- Point
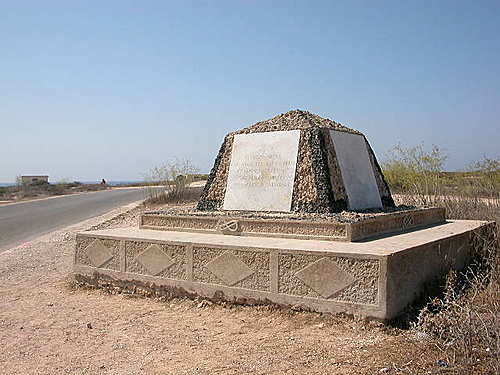
- Caposaldo Punta Pesce Spada

- Coordinates: 35°29′36″N 12°36′21″E
- Location: Lampedusa e Linosa, Sicily, Italy

Punta Pesce Spada, also called Punta Cavallo Bianco, constitutes the southernmost point of Italy and is located on the southern side of Lampedusa, a Sicilian island of the Pelagian archipelago in the province of Agrigento. It does not belong to the Italian geographical region but rather to the African Plate.

Located on a low and rocky shore just east of the island's port, between Punta Maccaferri and Cape Maluk, it is just 134 km (83 mi) from the coast of Tunisia and only 162 km (101 mi) from the island of Malta.

On 28 June 2008 the sculpture Porta di Lampedusa - Gate of Europe by Mimmo Paladino was inaugurated, dedicated to the memory of migrants who died at sea.
