= Rocca Bernauda =

Mountain in Italy

- Roche Bernaude
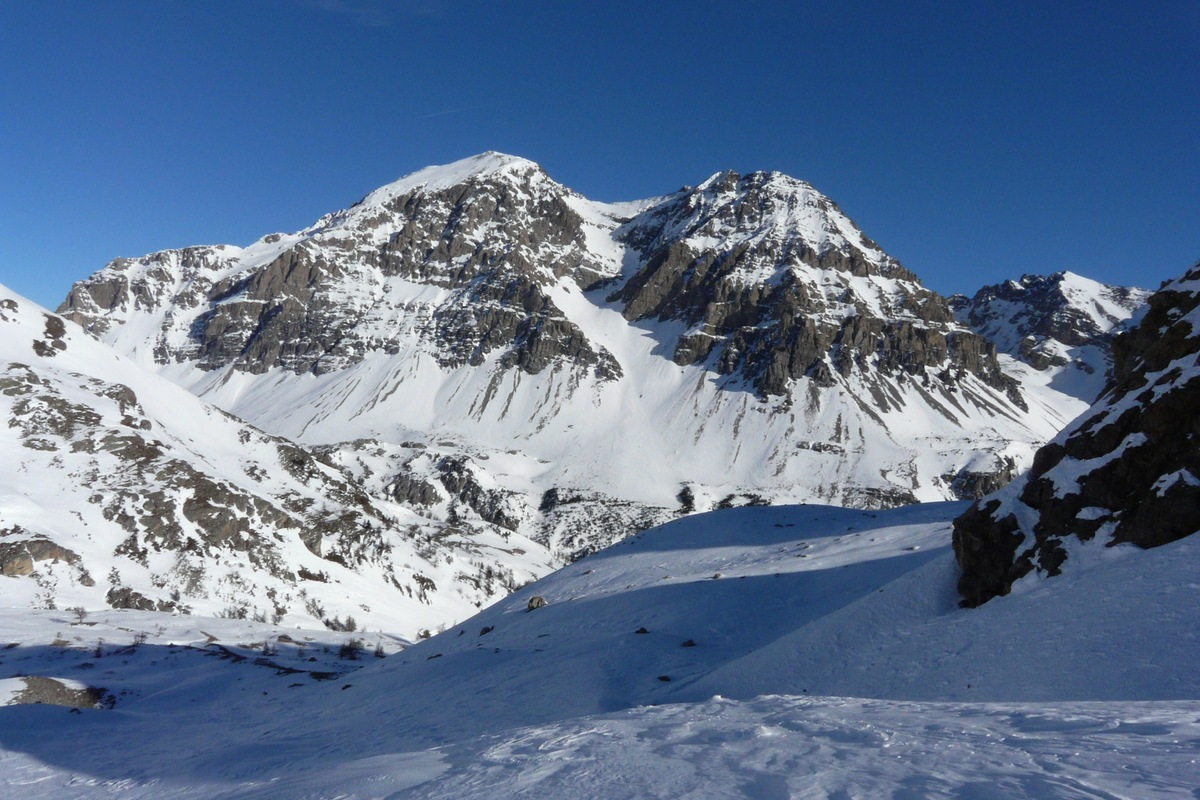

Highest point
- Elevation: 3,222 m (10,571 ft)
- Prominence: 687 m (2,254 ft)
- Isolation: 12.28 km (7.63 mi)
- Listing: Alpine mountains above 3000 m
- Coordinates: 45°06′11″N 06°37′36″E

Geography
- Location within Alps
- Location: Hautes-Alpes, France / Turin, Italy
- Parent range: Cottian Alps

Rocca Bernauda (French: Roche Bernaude) is a mountain of the Alps of 3,222 metres (10,571 ft). It is currently the westernmost point of Italy since the cession of Valle Stretta (Vallée Étroite) at the Paris Peace Treaties of 1947.

It is in the Cottian Alps close to Bardonecchia between the Susa Valley, Durance and Maurienne Valley With the Arc River. Geologically, it has quartzites and gneiss, especially at the peak.
