= History of South Tyrol =

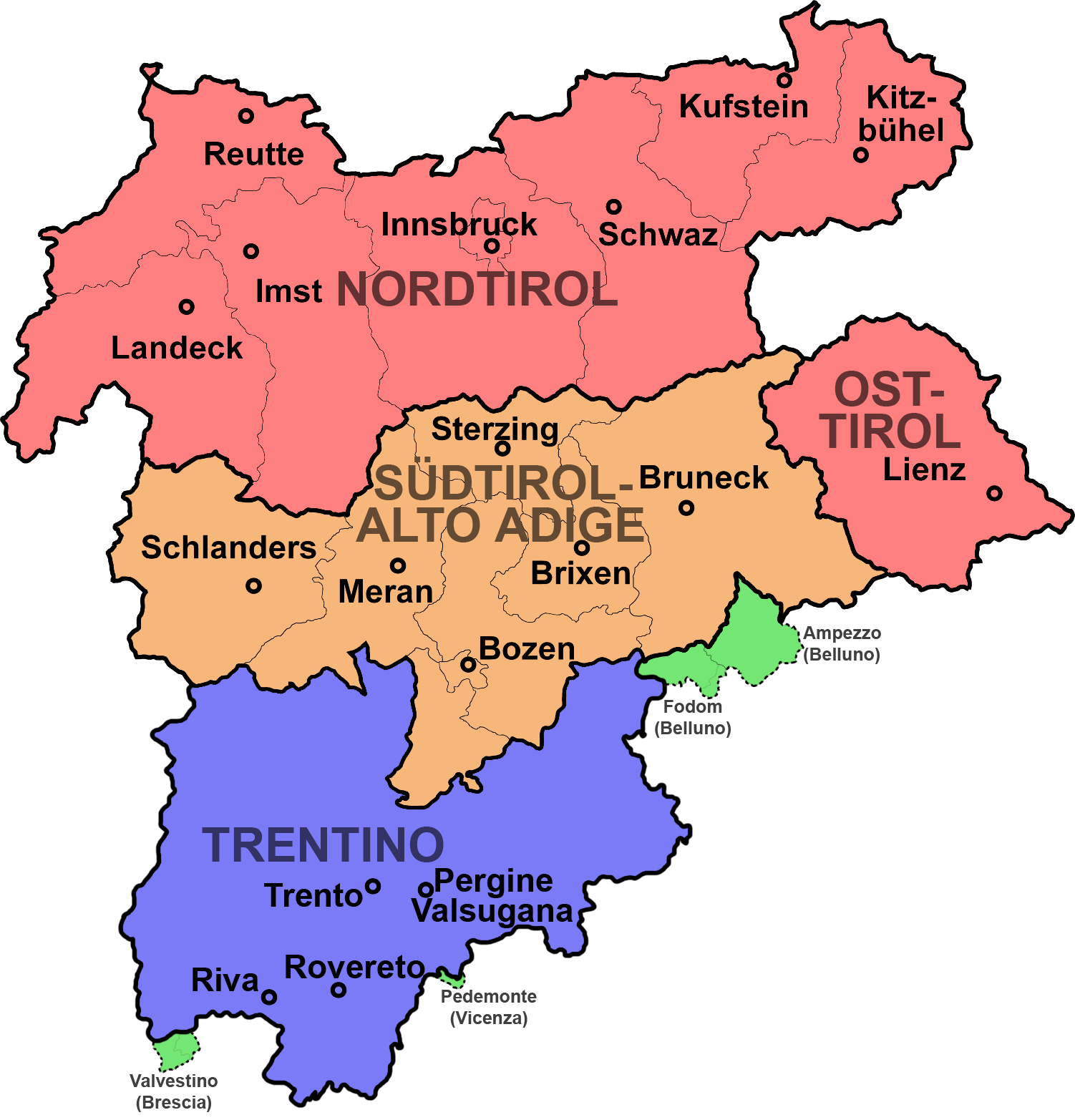
The former Tyrol today Tyrol (state) (Austria) South Tyrol (Italy) Trentino (Italy) Parts of the former county now within other Italian provinces

Modern-day South Tyrol, an autonomous Italian province created in 1948, was part of the Austro-Hungarian County of Tyrol until 1918 (then known as Deutschsüdtirol and occasionally Mitteltirol). It was annexed by Italy following the defeat of the Central Powers in World War I. It has been part of a cross-border joint entity, the Euroregion Tyrol-South Tyrol-Trentino, since 2001.

== Before the 19th century ==
=== Antiquity ===
In 15 BC the region, inhabited by the Alpine population of the Raeti, was conquered by the Roman commanders Drusus and Tiberius, and its northern and eastern parts were incorporated into the provinces of Raetia and Noricum respectively, while the southern part including the lower Adige and Eisack valleys around the modern-day city of Bolzano up to present-day Merano and Waidbruck (Sublavio) became part of Roman Italy (Italia), Regio X Venetia et Histria. The mountainous area then mainly was a transit country along Roman roads crossing the Eastern Alps like the Via Claudia Augusta, settled by Romanised Illyrian and Raeti tribes which had adopted the Vulgar Latin (Ladin) language.

=== Middle Ages ===
After the conquest of Italy by the Goths in 493, Tyrol became part of the Ostrogothic Kingdom of Italy in the 5th and the 6th centuries. Already in 534 the western Vinschgau region fell to the Kingdom of the Franks (Alamannia), while after the final collapse of the Ostrogothic Kingdom in 553 West Germanic Bavarians entered the region from the north. When the Lombards invaded Italy in 568 and founded the Kingdom of Italy, it also included the Duchy of Tridentum with the southernmost part of Tyrol. The border with the German stem duchy of Bavaria ran southwest of present-day Bolzano along the Adige River, with Salorno and the right bank (including Eppan, Kaltern and the area up to Lana on the Falschauer River) belonging to the Lombard kingdom. While the boundary remained unchanged for centuries, Bavarian settlers further migrated southwards down to Salorno (Salurn). The population was Christianised by the Bishops of Brixen and Trento.

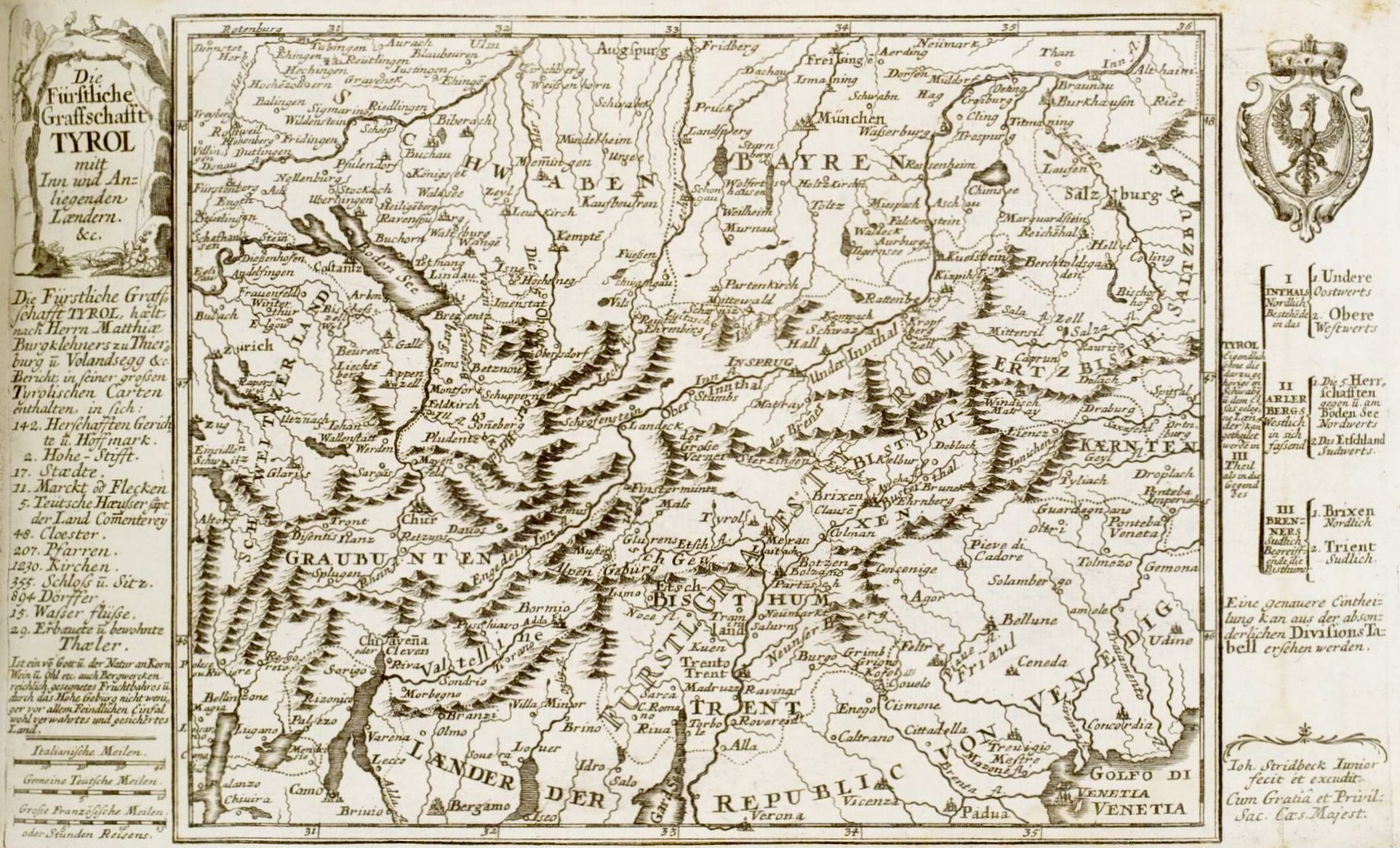
Map of the County of Tyrol, around 1700

In 1027 Emperor Conrad II established the Prince-bishopric of Trent in order to secure the route up to the Brenner Pass. He ceded the counties of Trento, Bolzano and Vinschgau to the Trent bishops and finally separated the territory on the east bank of the Adige River down to Mezzocorona (Deutschmetz) from the Imperial Kingdom of Italy. The Gau of Norital, including the Wipptal, the Eisacktal and the Val Badia, was granted to the newly established Prince-Bishopric of Brixen, followed in 1091 by the Puster Valley. Over the centuries, the episcopal reeves (Vögte) residing at Tirol Castle near Merano extended their territory over much of the region and came to surpass the power of the bishops who were nominally their feudal lords. The later Counts of Tyrol reached independence from the Duchy of Bavaria during the deposition of Duke Henry the Lion in 1180. Also in this period, from the late twelfth to the thirteenth centuries, have been established along the Brenner axis almost all of up-today's existing urban settlements, which can be categorized as marked-formed, not very densely populated small-towns, such as Bolzano, Merano, Sterzing or Bruneck.

=== Modern Age ===
From the 13th century they held much of their territory immediate from the Holy Roman Emperor and were elevated to Princes of the Holy Roman Empire in 1504.

Following defeat by Napoleon in 1805, the Austrian Empire was forced to cede the northern part of Tyrol to the Kingdom of Bavaria in the Peace of Pressburg. It became a member of the Confederation of the Rhine in 1806. Tyrol remained split between Bavaria and the Napoleonic Kingdom of Italy until it was returned to Austria by the Congress of Vienna in 1814. Integrated into the Austrian Empire, from 1867 it was a Kronland (Crown Land) of Cisleithania, the western half of Austria-Hungary.

== Age of nationalism ==
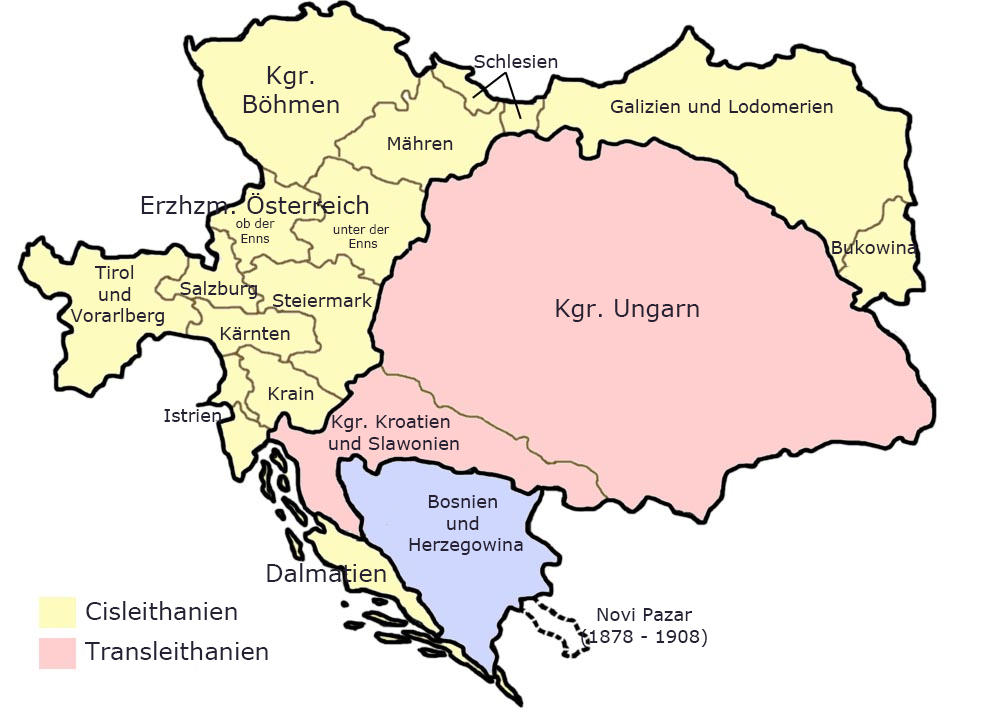
Austria-Hungary in 1914

After the Napoleonic Era, nationalism emerged as the dominant ideology in Europe. In Italy several intellectuals and groups began to push the idea of a unified nation-state (see Risorgimento). At the time, the struggle for Italian unification was largely waged against the Austrian Empire, which was the hegemonic power in Italy and the single most powerful adversary to unification. The Austrian Empire vigorously repressed the growing nationalist sentiment among Italian elites, most of all during 1848 revolution and the following years. Italy finally attained independence in 1861, annexed Venetia in 1866, and Latium, including Rome, in 1870.

However, for many nationalist intellectuals and political leaders, the process of unification of the Italian peninsula under a single national state was not complete. This was because several areas inhabited by Italian-speaking communities remained under what was seen as foreign rule. This situation gave rise to the idea that parts of Italy were still unredeemed, hence Italian irredentism became an important ideological component of the political life of the Kingdom of Italy: see Italia irredenta.

In 1882 Italy signed a defensive alliance with Austria-Hungary and Germany (see Triple Alliance). However, Italian public opinion remained unenthusiastic about the alignment with Austria-Hungary, still perceiving it as the historical enemy of Italy. In the years before World War I, many distinguished military analysts predicted that Italy would change sides.

Italy declared its neutrality at the beginning of World War I, because the Triple Alliance was a defensive one, requiring its members to come under attack to come into effect. Many Italians were still hostile to Austrian historical and continuing occupation of ethnically Italian areas. Austria-Hungary requested Italian neutrality, while the Triple Entente (Great Britain, France and Russia) demanded its intervention. Many people in Italy wanted the country to join the conflict on the side of the Triple Entente, with the aim of gaining the "unredeemed" territories.

Under the secret Treaty of London, signed in April 1915, Italy agreed to declare war against the Central Powers in exchange for (among other things) territorial gains in the Austrian crown lands of Tyrol, Küstenland and Dalmatia, homeland of large Italian minorities. War against the Austro-Hungarian Empire was declared on May 24, 1915.

In October 1917, the Italian army was defeated in the Battle of Caporetto, and was forced back to a defensive line along the Piave river. In June 1918, an Austro-Hungarian offensive against the Piave line was repulsed (see Battle of the Piave River). On October 24, 1918, Italy launched its final offensive against the Austro-Hungarian Army, which consequently collapsed (see Battle of Vittorio Veneto). The armistice of Villa Giusti was signed on November 3. It came into force at 3.00 pm on November 4. In the following days the Italian Army completed the occupation of all Tirol (including Innsbruck), according to the armistice terms.

== Annexation by Italy ==
Kingdom of Italy in 1919

Under the secret Treaty of London (1915), Italy "shall obtain the Trentino, Cisalpine Tyrol with its geographical and natural frontier (the Brenner frontier)" and after the ceasefire of Villa Giusti (November 3, 1918) Italian troops occupied uncontested the territory and as stipulated in the ceasefire agreement marched into North Tyrol and occupied Innsbruck and the Inn valley.

During the negotiations between Austria and the victorious Entente powers in Saint-Germain a petition for help, signed by all the mayors of South Tyrol, was presented to US President Woodrow Wilson. Wilson had announced his Fourteen Points to a joint session of Congress on January 8, 1918, and the mayors reminded him of point 9:

"A readjustment of the frontiers of Italy should be effected along clearly recognizable lines of nationality."

But when the Treaty of Saint-Germain was signed on September 10, 1919, Italy was given by Article 27, section 2 the ethnic German territories south of the Alpine watershed.

It has been claimed that Wilson later complained about the annexation:

"Already the president had, unfortunately, promised the Brenner Pass boundary to Orlando, which gave to Italy some 150,000 Tyrolese Germans-an action which he subsequently regarded as a big mistake and deeply regretted. It had been before he had made a careful study of the subject...."

As Italy had not yet adopted the toponymy created by Ettore Tolomei, all the names of locations in the treaty, except the Adige river, were in German (the same monolingual German approach to local names as in the Treaty of London).

At first, the territory was governed by a military regime under General Guglielmo Pecori-Giraldi, directly subordinated to the Comando Supremo. One of the first orders was to seal the border between South Tyrol and Austria. People were not allowed to cross, and the postal service and the flow of goods were interrupted; censorship was introduced and officials not born in the area were dismissed. On November 11, 1919, General Pecori-Giraldi proclaimed in the name of King Victor Emmanuel III in Italian and German: "... Italy is willing, as sole united nation with full freedom of thought and expression, to allow nationals of other language the preservation of their own schools, private institutions and associations." On December 1, 1919 the King promised in a speech: "a careful maintenance of local institutions and self-administration"

Italy formally annexed the territories on October 10, 1920. The administration passed from the military to the new Governatorato della Venezia Tridentina (Governorate of Venezia Tridentina) under Luigi Credaro. The term Venezia Tridentina had been proposed in 1863 by the Jewish linguist Graziadio Isaia Ascoli from Gorizia, who sought to include all of the territories of the Austro-Hungarian Empire claimed by Italy into a wider region called Venezia (the Julian March was accordingly named Venezia Giulia). The Governatorato included the present-day region of Trentino-Alto Adige/Südtirol and the three Ladin communes of Cortina, Colle Santa Lucia and Livinallongo, today in the Province of Belluno. The northern part of Tyrol, comprising North Tyrol and East Tyrol, became what is today one of the nine federal states of Austria.

On January 21, 1921, the Governatorato, while retaining military and police control, ceded administrative control to the new provincial council of the Provincia di Venezia Tridentina in Trento. On May 15, 1921, the people of the area participated for the first (and until April 18, 1948, the only) free and democratic elections (the people of Venezia Tridentina and Venezia Giulia did not participate in the general election of June 2, 1946). The result was a resounding victory for the Deutscher Verband (German Association), which won close to 90% of the votes and thus sent four deputies to Rome.

== Rise of fascism ==
Up to this time, the German-speaking population had not been subjected to violence and nor had the Italian authorities interfered with its cultural activities, traditions and schooling. This was about to change with the rise of fascism. The first hint of what was to come was experienced by the German population on Sunday April 24, 1921. The population of Bolzano-Bozen had organized a Trachtenumzug (a procession in traditional local costume) to celebrate the opening of the spring trade fair. The General Civil Commissioner of the province, Luigi Credaro, had been warned in advance by his colleagues from Mantua, Brescia, Verona and Vicenza of the intention of the fascists there to go to Bolzano-Bozen to disrupt the procession, but did not take any precautions. After arriving by train in Bolzano-Bozen the approximately 280 out-of-province fascists were joined by about 120 from Bolzano-Bozen, and proceeded to attack the procession with clubs, pistols and hand grenades. The teacher Franz Innerhofer from Marling was shot dead and around 50 people injured in the attack. After the attack the military intervened and escorted the fascists back to the station. Although Credaro, under orders from the Italian Prime Minister Giovanni Giolitti, had two suspects in Innerhofer's murder arrested, nobody was brought to justice for the attack, as Benito Mussolini had threatened to come to Bolzano-Bozen with 2,000 fascists to free the two suspects by force if they were not set free immediately. Mussolini made clear his policies regarding the people of South Tyrol:

"If the Germans on both sides of the Brenner don't toe the line, then the fascists will teach them a thing or two about obedience. Alto Adige is Italian and bilingual, and no one would even dream of trying forcibly to Italianize these German immigrants. But neither may Germans imagine that they might push Italy back to Salorno and from there to the Lago di Garda. Perhaps the Germans believe that all Italians are like Credaro. If they do, they’re sorely mistaken. In Italy, there are hundreds of thousands of Fascists who would rather lay waste to Alto Adige than to permit the tricolore that flies above the Vetta d’Italia to be lowered. If the Germans have to be beaten and stomped to bring them to reason, then so be it, we’re ready. A lot of Italians have been trained in this business."

=== Italianization ===
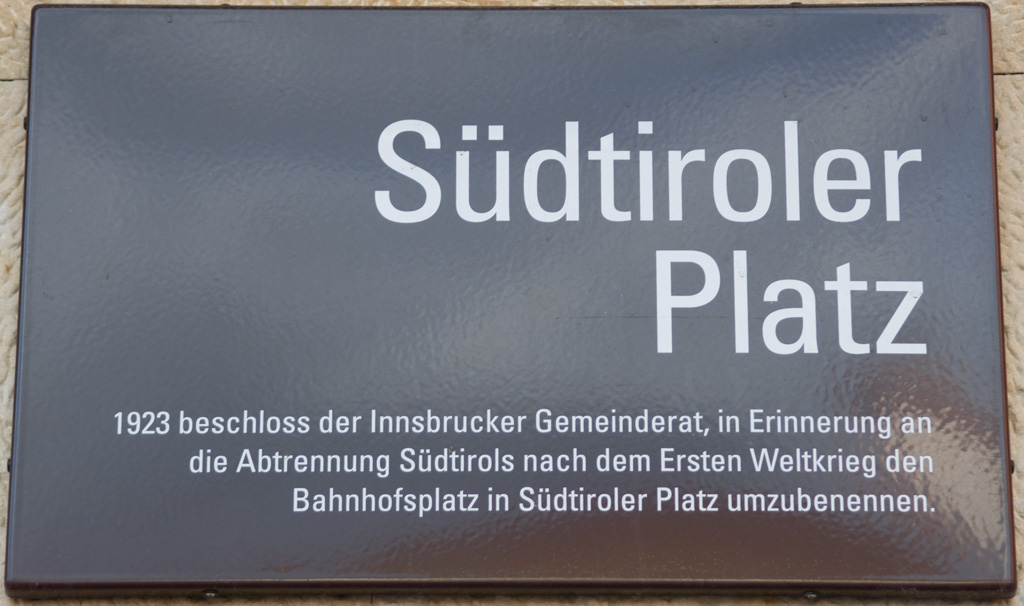
Street sign in Innsbruck, North Tyrol, commemorating the separation of South Tyrol, set up in 1923 in response to the prohibition of the original southern Tyrolean place names

In October 1922, the new Fascist government rescinded all the special dispensations that protected linguistic minorities.

The Italianization program had been started, and the Fascist regime charged Achille Starace and Ettore Tolomei (a nationalist from Rovereto) to drive it.

Tolomei's "program in 23 points" was adopted. Among other things it decreed:

- exclusive use of Italian in the public offices;
- closure of the majority of the German schools;
- incentives for immigrants from other Italian regions.

The first forms of opposition to the regime appeared in 1925: a priest, Michael Gamper, opened the first "Katakombenschulen", clandestine schools where teachers taught in German.

In 1926 the ancient institution of communal autonomy was abolished. Throughout Italy the "podestà", appointed by the government, replaced the mayors and had to report to the "prefetti".

A large industrial zone in Bolzano opened in 1935. It was followed by the immigration of many workers and their families from other parts of Italy (mainly from Veneto).

In this period of oppression, National Socialist propaganda became more and more successful among young South Tyroleans, leading in 1934 to the formation of the illegal local Nazi organization of the Völkischer Kampfring Südtirols (VKS).

=== German-Italian option agreement ===
Adolf Hitler never claimed any part of the Southern Tyrol for his Third Reich, even before the alliance with Benito Mussolini; in fact in Mein Kampf (1924) he claimed that Germans were just a small and irrelevant minority in Southern Tyrol (this definition including also Trentino) and he acknowledged the German portion of Southern Tyrol as a permanent possession of Italy. Hitler writes in Book II of Mein Kampf, "But I do not hesitate to declare that, now the dice have fallen, I not only regard a reconquest of the South Tyrol by war as impossible, but that I personally would reject it in the conviction that for this question the flame of national enthusiasm of the whole German people could not be achieved to a degree which would offer the premise for victory."

In 1939, both dictators in order to solve any further dispute agreed to give the German-speaking population a choice in the South Tyrol Option Agreement: they could emigrate to neighbouring Germany (including annexed Austria) or stay in Italy and accept complete Italianisation.

The South Tyrolean population was deeply divided. Those who wanted to stay (Dableiber) were condemned as traitors; those who left (Optanten), the majority, were defamed as Nazis. There was a plan to relocate the Optanten in Crimea (annexed to Greater Germany), but most were resettled in German-annexed Western Poland, where they were expelled or killed after the war. Because of the outbreak of World War II, this agreement was only partially carried out.

In 1939 Mussolini decided to build an Alpine Wall, a military fortification to defend Italy's northern land border.

== Annexation by Nazi Germany ==
In 1943, Mussolini was deposed and Italy surrendered to the Allies, who had invaded southern Italy via Sicily. German troops promptly invaded and occupied northern Italy to help Mussolini's side against the Allies and new Italy, and South Tyrol became part of the Operation Zone of the Alpine Foothills, along with Operation Zone of the Adriatic Littoral de facto annexed to Greater Germany. Many German-speaking South Tyroleans, after years of linguistic oppression and discrimination by Fascist Italy, wanted revenge upon ethnic Italians living in the area (particularly in the larger cities) but were mostly prevented from doing so by the occupying Nazis, who still considered Mussolini head of the Italian Social Republic and wanted to preserve good relations with the Italian Fascists, still supporting Mussolini against the Allies. Although the Nazis were able to recruit South Tyrolean youth and to capture local Jews, they prevented anti-Italian feelings from getting out of hand. Mussolini, who wanted to set up his new pro-German Italian Social Republic in Bolzano, was still a Nazi ally.

The region largely escaped fighting, and its mountainous remoteness proved useful to the Nazis as a refuge for items looted from across Europe. When the US 88th Infantry Division occupied South Tyrol from May 2 to May 8, 1945, and after the total unconditional surrender of Germany on May 8, 1945, it found vast amounts of precious items and looted art treasures. Among the items reportedly found were railway wagons filled with gold bars, hundreds of thousands of metres of silk, the Italian crown jewels, King Victor Emmanuel's personal collection of rare coins, and scores of works of art looted from art galleries such as the Uffizi in Florence. It was feared that the Germans might use the region, along with other Nazi-owned territories to make a last-ditch stronghold in the Alps to fight to the bitter end, and from there direct Werwolf activities in Allied-controlled territories, but this did not occur due to the suicide of Hitler, the disintegration and chaos of the Nazi apparatus and the rapid Nazi German surrender thereafter.

== After World War II ==
=== First Austrian-Italian agreement ===
Post-war newsreel story about Austrians demonstrating at a peace conference in favor of having the southern Tyrol region returned to Austria

In 1945 the South Tyrolean People's Party (Südtiroler Volkspartei) was founded, mainly by Dableiber, who had elected to stay in Italy after the agreement between Hitler and Mussolini.

As the Allies had decided that the province should remain a part of Italy, Italy and Austria negotiated an agreement in 1946, recognizing the rights of the German minority. This led to the creation of the Trentino-Alto Adige/Tiroler Etschland region, a new name for "Venezia Tridentina". German and Italian were both made official languages, and German-language education was permitted. But as the Italians were the majority in the region, self-government of the German minority was impossible.

Together with the arrival of new Italian-speaking migrants, this led to strong dissatisfaction among South Tyroleans, which culminated in terrorist acts perpetrated by the Befreiungsausschuss Südtirol (BAS–Committee for the liberation of South Tyrol). In a first phase only public buildings and fascist monuments were targeted. One of the most notable attacks was the Night of Fire, when the South Tyrolean Liberation Committee destroyed a number of electricity pylons. The second phase was bloodier, costing 21 lives (among them four activists and 15 Italian policemen and soldiers), four of them during a BAS ambush at Cima Vallona, province of Belluno, on 25 June 1967.

The South Tyrolean question (Südtirolfrage) became an international issue. As the implementation of the post-war agreement was not seen as satisfactory by the Austrian government, the matter became the cause of significant friction with Italy and was taken up by the United Nations in 1960. A fresh round of negotiations took place in 1961 but this proved unsuccessful.

=== The second agreement ===
Eventually, international (especially Austrian) public opinion and domestic considerations led the Italian government to consider a "Second statutory order" and to negotiate a package of reforms that produced the "Autonomy Statute", which virtually delinked the mostly German-speaking province of South Tyrol from the Trentino. The new agreement was signed in 1969 by Kurt Waldheim for Austria and by Aldo Moro for Italy. It stipulated that disputes in South Tyrol would be submitted for settlement to the International Court of Justice in The Hague, that the province would receive greater autonomy within Italy, and that Austria would not interfere in South Tyrol internal affairs. The agreement proved broadly satisfactory and the separatist tensions soon eased.

The new autonomous status, granted from 1972 onwards, has resulted in a considerable level of self-government, also due to the large financial resources of the province of Bolzano/Bozen, retaining almost 90% of all levied taxes. It took a further 20 years for the reforms to be fully implemented, the last in 1992. After a debate in Parliament, Vienna declared the dispute closed. On June 18, 1992 the release was signed by Italy and Austria in New York, in front of the United Nations building.

Today, South Tyrol is peaceful and the wealthiest Italian province, enjoying a high degree of autonomy. It has strong relations with the Austrian state of Tyrol, especially since Austria's 1995 entry into the European Union, which has led to a common currency and a de facto disappearance of the borders.

The whole historic region of Tyrol, comprising the Austrian state of Tyrol and the Italian Trentino-Alto Adige/Südtirol, forms a Euroregion, a region of intensified cross-border cooperation within the EU, called "Tyrol-South Tyrol-Trentino", and a joint Tyrolean parliament has been established, albeit with limited powers.

== Linguistic and demographic history ==
At the time of its annexation, South Tyrol was inhabited by a large German-speaking majority. According to the census of 1910, which listed four groups according to their spoken language, the area was inhabited by approximately 89% German speakers, 3.8% Ladin, 2.9% Italian, and 4.3% speakers of other languages of the Austrian Empire, altogether 251,000 people. According to some sources, the census did not include some 9000 immigrants from Italy. However, from the official provincial statistics of the "Autonomous Province of South Tyrol" it appears that Italian citizens were indeed registered in the census, although not necessarily as Italian speakers.

In the following, the population is listed by language group, according to the censuses undertaken from 1880 to 2001. In absolute numbers:

Ethnic distribution in 1880

Language distribution in 2001

Language distribution in 2011

Language distribution in 2024

Year	German	Italian	Ladin	Others	Total	Country
1880	186,087	6,884	8,822	3,513	205,306	Austria-Hungary
1890	187,100	9,369	8,954	6,884	210,285	Austria-Hungary
1900	197,822	8,916	8,907	7,149	222,794	Austria-Hungary
1910	223,913	7,339	9,429	10,770	251,451	Austria-Hungary
1921	193,271	27,048	9,910	24,506	254,735	Italy
1961	232,717	128,271	12,594	281	373,863	Italy
1971	260,351	137,759	15,456	475	414,041	Italy
1981	279,544	123,695	17,736	9,593	430,568	Italy
1991	287,503	116,914	18,434	17,657	440,508	Italy
2001	296,461	113,494	18,736	34,308	462,999	Italy
2011	314,604	118,120	20,548	58,478	511,750	Italy
2024	309,000	121,520	19,853	86,560	511,750	Italy

In percentages:

Year	German	Italian	Ladin	Others	Total	Country
1880	90.6	3.4	4.3	1.7	100.0	Austria-Hungary
1890	89.0	4.5	4.3	2.3	100.0	Austria-Hungary
1900	88.8	4.0	4.0	3.2	100.0	Austria-Hungary
1910	89.0	2.9	3.8	4.3	100.0	Austria-Hungary
1921	75.9	10.6	3.9	9.6	100.0	Italy
1961	62.2	34.3	3.4	0.1	100.0	Italy
1971	62.9	33.3	3.7	0.1	100.0	Italy
1981	64.9	28.7	4.1	2.2	100.0	Italy
1991	65.3	26.5	4.2	4.0	100.0	Italy
2001	64.0	24.5	4.0	7.4	100.0	Italy
2011	61.5	23.1	4.0	11.4	100.0	Italy
2024	57.6	22.6	3.7	16.1	100.0	Italy

== Secessionist movement ==
Given the region's historical and cultural association with neighboring Austria, calls for the secession of South Tyrol and its reunification with Austria are notable in the local and national political climate. Polls conducted in 2013 noted that 46% of South Tyrol's population would favor secession from Italy. Among the political parties that support South Tyrol's reunification into Austria are South Tyrolean Freedom, Die Freiheitlichen and Citizens' Union for South Tyrol.

== See also ==
- Timeline of Bolzano

== Bibliography ==
- Paula Sutter Fichtner (2009). "South Tyrol". Historical Dictionary of Austria. USA: Scarecrow Press. pp. 282+. ISBN 978-0-8108-6310-1.
- Georg Grote, Hannes Obermair (2017). A Land on the Threshold. South Tyrolean Transformations, 1915–2015. Oxford, Bern, New York: Peter Lang. pp. 417+. ISBN 978-3-0343-2240-9.
- Giovanni Bernardini, Günther Pallaver (2017). Dialogue against Violence. The Question of Trentino-South Tyrol in the International Context. Bologna, Berlin: Il Mulino - Duncker & Humblot. pp. 256+. ISBN 978-88-15-27340-6.
