= Italy (geographical region) =

Geographical subregion of Southern Europe

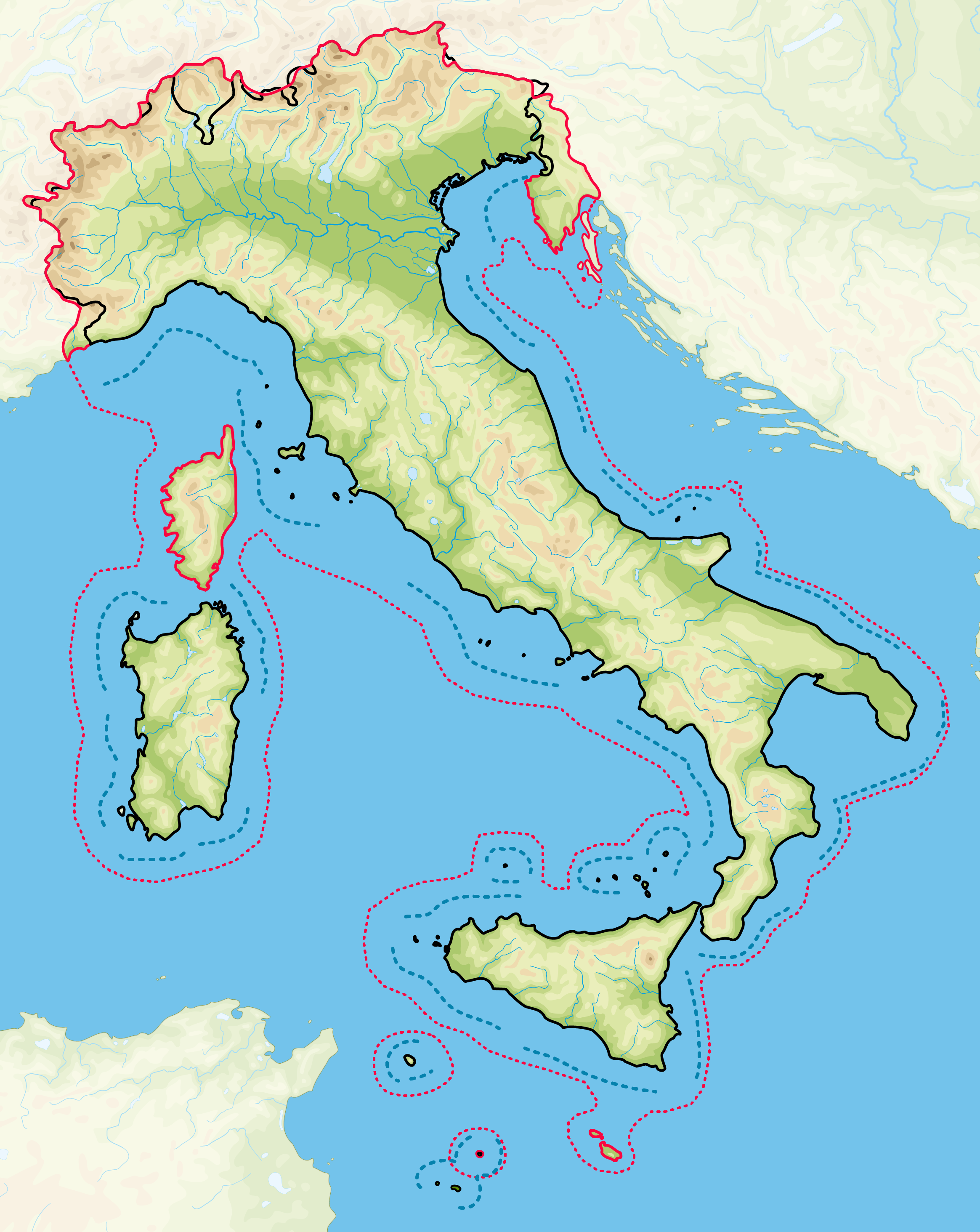
The borders of the Italian Republic in black, the borders of the Italian geographical region in red

The Italian geographic region, Italian physical region or Italian region is a geographical region of Southern Europe delimited to the north by the mountain chains of the Alps. This subregion is composed of a peninsular and continental part and an insular part. Located between the Balkan Peninsula and the Iberian Peninsula, it protrudes into the centre of the Mediterranean Sea and overlooks the Adriatic Sea, the Ionian Sea, the Ligurian Sea, the Sardinian Channel, the Sea of Corsica, the Sea of Sardinia, the Strait of Sicily, and the Tyrrhenian Sea.

The Italian geographic region, in its traditional and most widely accepted extent, has an area of approximately 324,000 square kilometres (125,000 mi^{2}), which is greater than the area of the entire Italian Republic (301,230 square kilometres (116,310 mi^{2})). The region also includes territories that are sovereign parts of Croatia, France, Slovenia, and Switzerland, as well as the four small sovereign states of the Principality of Monaco, the Republic of Malta, the Republic of San Marino, and the Vatican City State (the Holy See).

== Name of Italy ==
The meaning of the term Italy has been the subject of reconstructions not only by linguists but also by historians, traditionally attentive to the question; however, one is not always faced with etymologies in the strict sense but rather with hypotheses that are based on considerations external to the specifically linguistic reconstruction of the name, and which over time have formed a rich corpus of solutions among which there are numerous ones that refer to traditions or in any case highly problematic.

Since ancient times it has been hypothesized that the name derives from the word Italói, a term with which the Greeks designated the Vituli, a population that lived in the extreme tip of the peninsula, the region south of today's Catanzaro, who worshipped the simulacrum of a calf. The name would therefore mean "inhabitants of the land of calves".

What is usually considered certain is that the name initially indicated only that extreme part of Calabria which lies to the south of the gulfs of Saint Euphemia and Squillace; subsequently the name "Italy" was extended as far as Cilento and Lucania, between the river Lao and Metaponto.

Evolution of the geographical extension of the territory which, de jure, constituted Italy during the Roman era. De facto, all the lands south of the Alps were called Italy from the battle of Clastidium in 222 BC.

Gradually the name "Italy" was used to indicate an ever larger territory, extending progressively and unstoppably towards the north: in the 4th century BC it extended as far as Paestum and Taranto; around 300 BC it expanded to include the whole of Campania. At the beginning of the 3rd century BC almost the entire peninsula was defined as "Italy", from Tuscany to the Marche, unified under Roman domination. De facto, all the lands south of the Alps were called "Italy" from the late 3rd century BC (likely from the battle of Clastidium in 222 BC). De jure, the northern border of Italia was moved west from the Esino to the Rubicon and east to include Liguria, apparently by Sulla. Under Augustus it was brought to correspond off exactly with its current meaning: the northern border was made to coincide with the Alps, the western border with the Var river and the eastern border with the Raša river, in Istria. Finally, with Diocletian, the name "Italy" was extended to Sicily, Sardinia, and Corsica, that is, to the entire Italian geographical region.

== Geography ==
=== Physical geography ===
In common language, the Italian region generally refers to the Italian Peninsula. Similarly, the inhabitants of the islands use the term continent to designate the mainland that goes from the Alps to Reggio Calabria. Geographically, Italy running in north-west to south-east direction can be divided into the calcareous Alps, the alluvial plain, the Northern, Central and Southern Apennines and Sicily.

==== Geographical limits ====
The natural limits of the Italian region, marked by the Alpine drainage divide and the sea, are relatively clear, except at the western and eastern extremities of the Alps.

On the eastern borders, the chain of the Julian Alps and the Kvarner Gulf are traditionally indicated, to which Dante Alighieri also refers. However, other proposed limits include a border along the Isonzo (formerly advocated by Austrian Empire), which would exclude the upper Isonzo valley, Trieste and Istria entirely. Other borders were listed by the historian, and exile from Cherso, Luigi Tomaz in "The border of Italy in Istria and Dalmatia", among which, in the Augustan regional structure of Roman Italy, the administrative limes along the Arsa River, marked the end of Venetia et Histria.

Therefore, to the east, despite the more depressed character of the orography and the scarcity of surface hydrography found in the region south of the Nauporto pass near Postumia, the continuity of the mountain bulwark is ensured by the reliefs placed between Mount Pomario and Mount Nevoso, its terminal pillar, where it reaches the Kvarner Gulf and the Bay of Buccari, immediately south-east of Fiume. To the east, therefore, the extreme limit of Italy is generally identified in Buccari. To the south-east of the Nauporto pass and to the north-west of Mount Pomario, the traceability of the natural border is rather difficult as in this area the hydrographic watershed does not coincide with the orographic chain, which is characterized by rather small peaks.

As for the islands of Cherso and Lussino, their belonging to the Italian geographical region may vary according to the sources and interpretations. In particular, they are included in the Italian geographical region as these islands are the natural continuation of Istria, being closer to the Istrian coasts than to the Dalmatian ones.

On the contrary, to the west, the boundary is unchallenged and easily definable between the canton of Valais, Savoy, Aosta Valley and Piedmont, near the coast can be represented by that buttress of the Maritime Alps which, detaching itself from the Po-French drainage divide in correspondence with Monte Clapier, follows the Authion Massif, which culminates in Mont Bégo, and divides the Roia basin to the east from the Varo and Paglione basins to the west. The salient created by the side valley of the Bevera including the Mentone basin is orographically separated from everything, thus grafting the border at Capo d'Aglio where the entire Principality of Monaco is included. Due to the characteristic of being orographically separated from everything, the Menton basin can be excluded. In the latter case, the geographical limit would rejoin the current international state border at the height of Mount Buletta, corresponding with it up to the sea (this is not a priori correspondence but a simple correspondence by convergence between the geographical and political border; the latter is cited for convenience). (Note: As evidence of the orographic naturalness of this line, it is recalled how it was used in the autumn-winter 1944–1945 by the Wehrmacht as the best line of defense of the Italian Social Republic from the Franco-American armies settled in Provence after the liberation of France. Even further back, a German army had already used the same line when the Austrian army allied with the Savoy had put itself on the defensive against the French revolutionaries between 1793 and 1796.) (Note: As already mentioned above, this thesis was accepted by Octavian Augustus in tracing the borders of Italy in the area.) (Note: "Between Lerice and Turbìa the most deserted, the most broken ruin is a staircase, towards that, easy and open.", Dante Alighieri, vv.49-51, Chapt. III, Purgatorio, La Divina Commedia.)

This solution makes it possible to bring the border of the Italian geographic region closer to the ethno-linguistic one between Ligurian, Intemelio and Occitan languages of the Niçard dialect. Another hypothesis would have it that the border, after touching the top of Mont Pelat, includes the entire basin of the Varo river with its tributaries, placing Nice within the Italian region, or that, albeit smaller, than from Monte Clapier divides the Roia and Paglione basins on one side from that of the Varo on the other, reaching the coast not far from the latter's mouth, south-west of Nice, thus leaving Nice still in the geographic region of Italy (as Francesco Petrarca already claimed in 1331). (Note: "But while you were eager to go to Italy, you were already in Italy: according to poets and cosmographers, the border to it is the Varo, beyond which Nice is on the land of Italy.", Francesco Petrarca, Lettera VII a Giovanni Colonna di San Vito in Lettere di Francesco Petrarca, vol. I, Firenze, Le Monnier, 1863, p. 360.) However, there is an opposite thesis, supported by Charles de Gaulle at the end of World War II, which, assigning the nature of a transalpine pass to Colle di Tenda, excludes the entire Roia Valley with Ventimiglia from the Italian physical region.

==== Continental and peninsular part ====
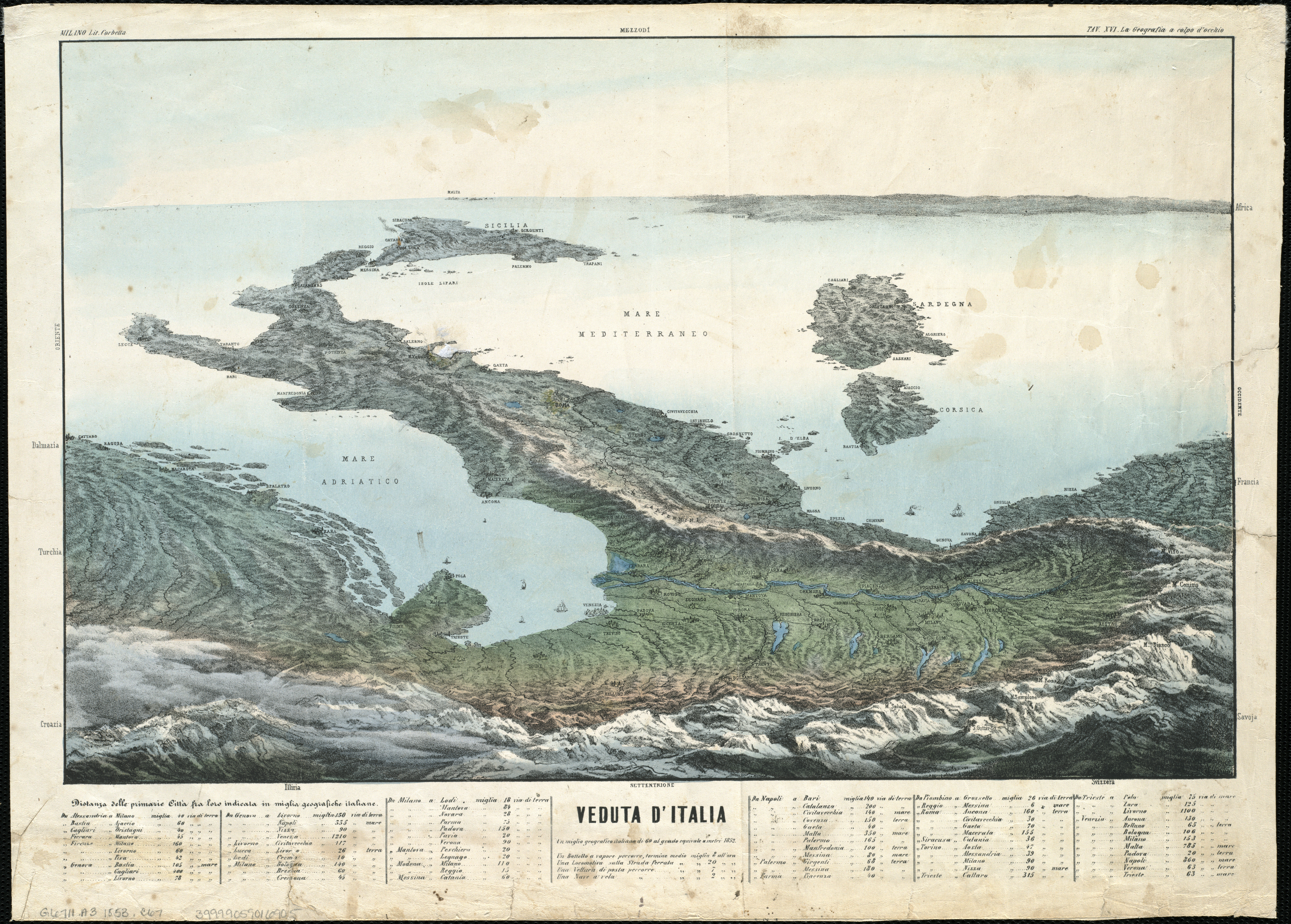
Italy in a map dated 1853

In a narrow sense, the continental part, delimited to the north by the Alpine watershed, to about 40% of the Italian region and is located in the north of an imaginary line that goes from the mouth of the Magra river to that of the Rubicone river. Most of them are made up of the water catchment areas of the Po, Adige, Brenta, Piave, Tagliamento and Isonzo rivers. From the continental part, however, some Alpine valleys are excluded which, although they are part of the Italian State, such as the Val di Lei tributary of the North Sea through the Rhine river, the Val di Livigno, the Sella di Dobbiaco and the Tarvisio basin to the north-east of the Camporosso saddle, tributaries of the Black Sea through rivers affluent of the Danube.

The Italian Peninsula, or the Italic Peninsula or the Apennine Peninsula, is a peninsula on the European continent crossed by the Apennine chain and delimited by four seas: the Ligurian Sea, the Tyrrhenian Sea, the Ionian Sea and the Adriatic Sea. Together with the Iberian Peninsula and the Balkan Peninsula, they are the three peninsulas that make up Southern Europe.

The peninsula in a narrow sense begins from the Tuscan-Romagna Apennines, starting from an imaginary line that goes from the mouth of the Magra river to that of the Rubicone river, and extends to the extreme southern offshoot of Capo Spartivento in Calabria. The peninsula has an extension of about 1.000 kilometre (0.621 mi) in a north-west / south-east direction. The closest large islands, Sicily, Sardinia, and Corsica, are not parts of it. The peninsula corresponds to about 45% of the Italian geographical region.

==== Insular part ====
The island part extends over an area of about 60,000 square kilometres (23,000 mi^{2}) (about 18.5% of the whole Italian region), of which 58,000 square kilometres (22,000 mi^{2}) for Sicily, Sardinia, and Corsica. Outside these large islands, numerous smaller islands, often grouped in archipelagos, are found along the Italian coast, mostly in the Tyrrhenian Sea. The list below shows the largest islands belonging to the Italian geographical region:

Name	Area	Sea	Country
Sicily	25,460 km^{2} (9,830 mi^{2})	Mediterranean, Tyrrhenian, Ionian	Italy
Sardinia	24,090 km^{2} (9,300 mi^{2})	Mediterranean, Tyrrhenian	Italy
Corsica	8,681 km^{2} (3,352 mi^{2})	Mediterranean, Tyrrhenian	France
Cres (Cherso) (Note: Whether or not the islands of Cres (Cherso), Lošinj (Lussino), and Krk (Veglia) belong to the Italian geographical region varies according to the sources. In particular, some see the first two as a natural continuation of the Istrian peninsula, and Cres and Lošinj are closer to the Istrian coast than to the Dalmatian one, unlike Krk. Furthermore, various smaller islands show a continuity between Krk and Rab (Arbe), a distinctly Dalmatian island.)	406 km^{2} (157 mi^{2})	Adriatic	Croatia
Malta	246 km^{2} (95 mi^{2})	Mediterranean	Malta
Elba	223 km^{2} (86 mi^{2})	Tyrrhenian	Italy
Sant'Antioco	109 km^{2} (42 mi^{2})	Mediterranean	Italy
Pantelleria	83 km^{2} (32 mi^{2})	Mediterranean	Italy
Lošinj (Lussino)	74 km^{2} (29 mi^{2})	Adriatic	Croatia
Gozo	64 km^{2} (25 mi^{2})	Mediterranean	Malta
San Pietro	51 km^{2} (20 mi^{2})	Mediterranean	Italy

==== Extreme points ====
The extreme points of the Italian geographical region, measured with respect to the Greenwich meridian, are:

- to the north, the Testa Gemella Occidentale in the Aurine Alps, in Alto Adige/Südtirol, at 47° 04′ 20″ north;
- to the south, the South Cape of the Piccolo Sciutu rock, in the Maltese Archipelago, at 35° 47′ 04″ north;
- to the east, Capo d'Otranto, in Apulia, Italy, at 18° 31′ 13″ east longitude.
- to the west, the Rocca di Chardonnet in the Cottian Alps, in France, at 6° 32′ 52″ east.

The orthodromic distance N–S is 1,269 km.

=== Political geography ===
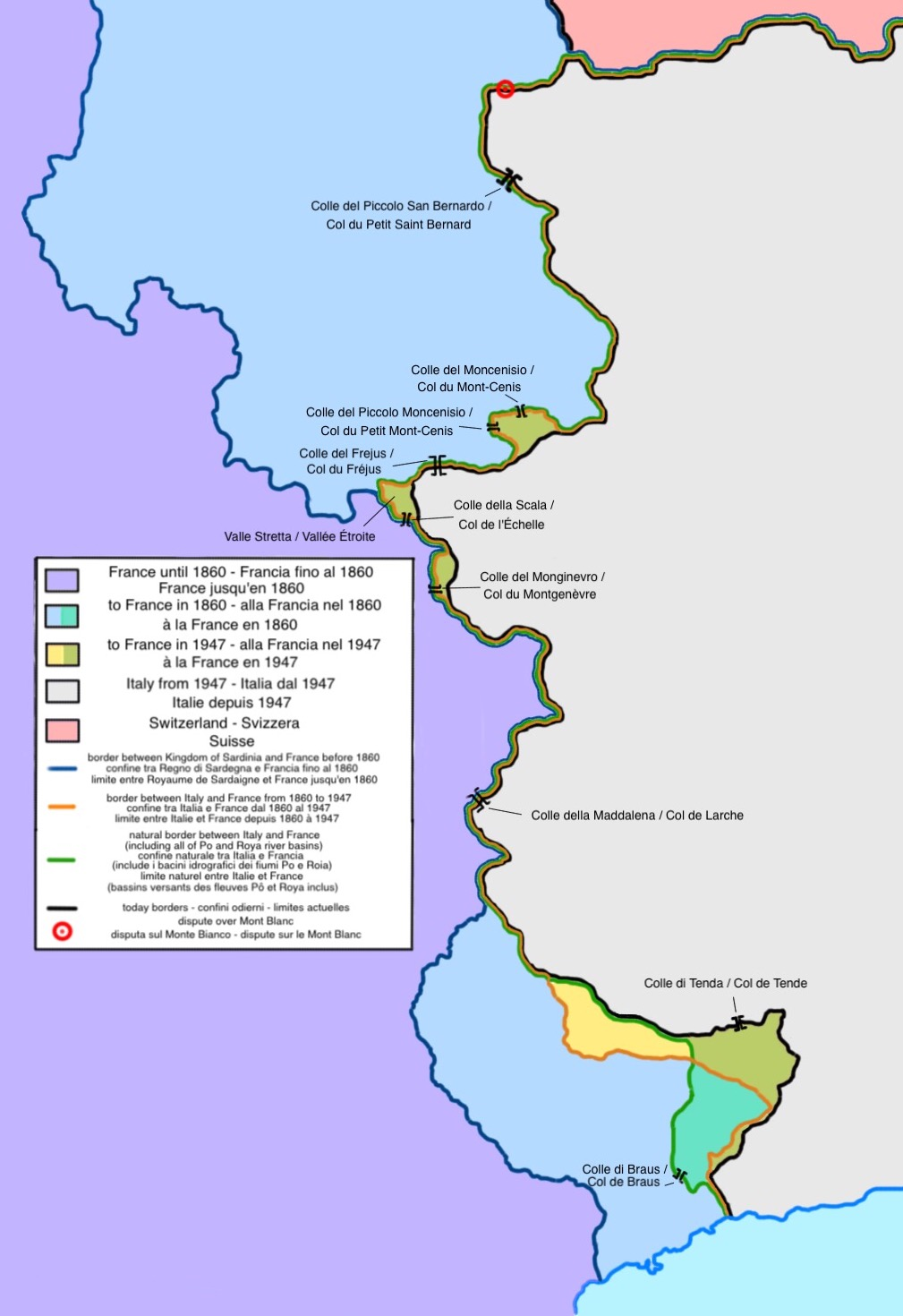
Map of the historical western borders of Italy with highlighting of the natural borders

The Italian Republic occupies 93% of the Italian geographical region. The remaining portion (23 000 km^{2}) is divided between several other states, some of which (in order of geographical extension: Malta, San Marino, Monaco, and Vatican City) are entirely included in the political borders. Some strips of western Niçard and the Alpine sector near the French border (Italian up to the 1947 Peace Treaty), Corsica, Italian Switzerland, the Maltese Islands, and Julian March, Slovenian and Croatian, are also ascribed to the Italian geographical region, including the city of Fiume.

The following countries are entirely included in the limits of the Italian geographical region:

- the Principality of Monaco (entirely included in the continental part, to the west);
- the Republic of Malta (entirely included in the insular part, to the south);
- the Republic of San Marino (entirely included in the peninsular part, to the north-east);
- the Vatican City State (entirely included in the peninsular part, in the center-west).

The following areas also fall within the borders of the Italian geographical region:

- in Croatia (partly included in the continental part and in the insular part, in the east):

Istria, the city of Fiume, the Pelagosa archipelago and, according to an extensive thesis, the two islands of Cherso and Lussino;

- in France (partly included in the continental part and in the insular part, to the west):

Corsica and the Roia Valley (with Briga Marittima and Tenda, sold with the Treaty of Paris of 1947), Colle del Monginevro, Valle Stretta behind Bardonecchia, the area of Mont Chaberton near the Montgenevre pass, the Colle area Mont Cenis with the Mont Cenis lake (also ceded with the 1947 Treaty of Paris), and the Mentone basin up to Turbìa;

- in Slovenia (partly included in the continental part, to the east):

the Slovenian Julian Alps (Slovenian Gorizia), a part of western Carniola and the Slovene Littoral;

- in Switzerland (partly included in the continental part, to the north):

the upper Val Divedro in the canton of Valais, the Canton of Ticino (with the exception of the upper valley of the Reuss and the Val Cadlimo with the Piz Blas) as well as - in the Canton of Grisons - the Val Mesolcina, the Val Calanca, the Val Bregaglia, the Val Poschiavo and Val Monastero (all, except the latter, in any case constituting Italian-speaking Switzerland).

Three alpine valleys, tributaries of the Rhine and Danube, as well as Lampedusa and Lampione of the Pelagian Islands (small islands located on the African continental shelf) are parts of the Italian Republic even though they are not parts of the Italian geographical region.

== History ==
=== Ancient times ===
Regions of Augustan Italy, in addition to the Province of Sardinia and Corsica, as well as Sicily's

The idea of Italy as a geographic region is very old. It was described with the geographical notion of peninsula as early as the 1st century BC in the oldest treatise called Geographica (in ancient Greek: Γεωγραφικά - Gheographikà), a work in 17 volumes by the Greek geographer Strabo (65/64 – 25/21 BC). In the 15th century, Guarino da Verona translated the entire work into Latin, thus contributing to its rediscovery.

In the introduction of his book, Strabo gives his definition of Italy:

Present-day Italy begins at the foot of the Alps: [I mean present-day Italy], because this name initially indicated only the ancient Ouitoulía, that is the district located between the Strait of Sicily and the gulf of Taranto and Poseidonia; but, having taken on a sort of predominance over time, this name has ended up extending to the foot of the Alps, also embracing, on the one hand, all of Liguria up to the Varo and of course also the surroundings of Liguria from the border with the Etruria, and, on the other side, all of Istria up to Pula.

— Strabo, Geographica - Book V - Chapter I: The Transpadania and the Cispadania

=== Middle Ages ===
For several centuries, the geographical description of Strabo did not change until the publication of the first universal geography of Conrad Malte-Brun (1775–1826), Geography or description of all parts of the world.

After the fall of the Western Roman Empire, and in particular with the arrival of the Lombards, Italy lost its political unity. In the Carolingian age, a new Kingdom of Italy was born (Latin: Regnum Italicum); it included only Northern Italy. Conversely, from the point of view of the Byzantine Empire, Italía was predominantly coterminous with Catepanate of Italy, i.e. the Southern Italy that they controlled and that was home to a substantial Greek-speaking population. In addition, starting from the 12th century, Northern Italy itself found itself divided into a myriad of small states often in conflict with each other or victims of foreign expansionist aims.

However, in the 14th century, Dante Alighieri wrote in the Divine Comedy (L'Inferno, Canto IX, 114):

As in Pola, near del Carnaro, where Italy closes and its terms wet.

— Dante Alighieri

Similarly, Francesco Petrarca wrote at the same time in his work the Il Canzoniere (s. CXLVI, 13–14):

that fair country, the Apennines divide, and Alps and sea surround.

— Francesco Petrarca

=== 19th century ===
==== Napoleonic era ====
In his memoirs written during his captivity on the island of Saint Helena, but published only in 2010, Napoleon Bonaparte makes a description of Italy in the first chapter:

Italy is surrounded by the Alps and the sea, its natural limits are determined with the same precision as if it were an island. It is located between 36° and 46° degree of latitude, 4° and 16° of longitude of Paris; it consists of three parts: the mainland, the peninsula and the islands. The first is separated from the second by the Isthmus of Parma. If from Parma, as the center, a semicircle is traced on the north side with a radius equal to the distance from Parma to the mouth of the Var or the mouth of the Isonzo (60 leagues), the development of the chain of the upper part of the Alps that separates Italy from the mainland. This semicircle forms the territory of the so-called continental part, the surface of which is 5,000 square leagues. The peninsula is a trapezoid between the mainland to the north, the Mediterranean to the west, the Adriatic to the east, the Ionian Sea to the south, the two main sides of which are 200 to 210 leagues long, and the other two sides 60 to 30 alloys; its surface is 6000 square alloys. The third part, that is the islands, that is Sicily, Sardinia, Corsica, which geographically belongs more to Italy than to France, forms an area of 4000 square leagues; which brings the surface of the whole of Italy to 15,000 square alloys. Here we have considered the natural limits without entering into any political division. Thus we have not understood Savoy, which is beyond the Alps, nor Dalmatia, nor Istria, and we have understood the part of the Italian-Swiss nurses that are below the Alps, and all the part of Tyrol that pours its waters in the Adige and under the Brenner; all this, moreover, forms few changes. On the eastern side the border mark was placed on the Isonzo, even if the natural division of the mountains would pass between Laybach and Isonzo, would include a portion of Carniola and Istria, and would unite the Adriatic to Rijeka; but at the Isonzo the mountains of the Alps are lowered and their consideration becomes less

— Napoleon Bonaparte

==== Italian unification and the effects of nationalism ====
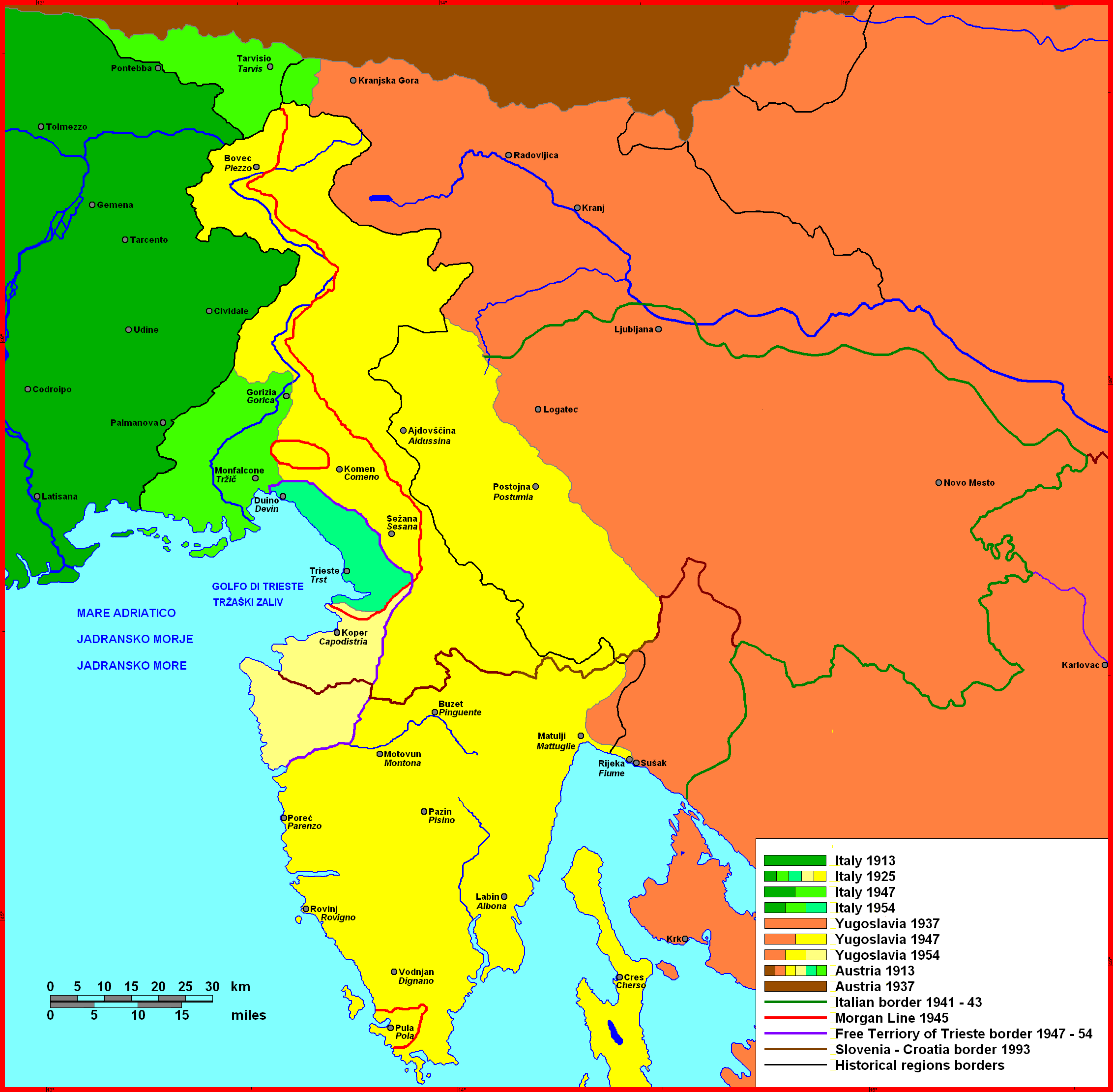
Changes to the Italian eastern border from 1920 to 1975: The Austrian Littoral, later renamed Julian March, which was assigned to Italy in 1920 with the Treaty of Rapallo (with adjustments of its border in 1924 after the Treaty of Rome) and which was then ceded to Yugoslavia in 1947 with the Treaty of Paris Areas annexed to Italy in 1920 and remained Italian even after 1947 Areas annexed to Italy in 1920, passed to the Free Territory of Trieste in 1947 with the Paris treaties and definitively assigned to Italy in 1975 with the Treaty of Osimo Areas annexed to Italy in 1920, passed to the Free Territory of Trieste in 1947 with the Paris treaties and definitively assigned to Yugoslavia in 1975 with the Osimo treaty

After the fall of Napoleon and the restoration of the absolutist monarchical regimes, Italy remained, according to Metternich, "a simple geographical expression" without political unity. However, a process had been set in motion that would lead to the unification of Italy.

After the proclamation of Vittorio Emanuele II King of Italy on 17 March 1861, the new united Italy experienced the birth of the Italian nationalism and the Italian irredentism, which claimed that the natural border of Italy had to pass on the crest of the Alps based on geographical concepts. Furthermore, the environment that gravitates around the Società Geografica Italiana of Rome and the Società di Studi Geografici of Florence was strongly imbued with a nationalist spirit which, during the following decades, will become more and more colonialist and militarist. This would explain, as Lucio Gambi demonstrated, the enthusiastic and almost unanimous adhesion of Italian geographers to fascism a few decades later.

=== 20th century ===
After World War I, the notion of the Italian geographical region diminished, as the natural borders, except for some marginal territory, were mostly reached with the annexation of Trentino-Alto Adige and Julian March, and it was on other scales that Italian nationalism and imperialism were expressed, well beyond the borders of the Italian geographical region.

After World War II, Italy lost a large part of Julian March, and Italian geography eliminated all political and nationalistic aspects to focus only on geographic ones. Therefore, the notion of Italian geographic region, including territories that are not part of the Italian Republic, continues to be present in some Italian geographic encyclopedias, such as the one published by the De Agostini.
