= School system in South Tyrol =

Due to the status of South Tyrol as an autonomous province within Italy, its school system is distinctly marked by a multi-lingual language politics. With regard to the acquisition of the respective second language of their pupils (i.e. German for Italian pupils, Italian for German pupils, Italian and German for Ladin-speaking pupils), schools in the area may differ considerably from one another depending on which linguistic group they are associated with.

== Socio-linguistic foundations of second language acquisition in South Tyrol ==
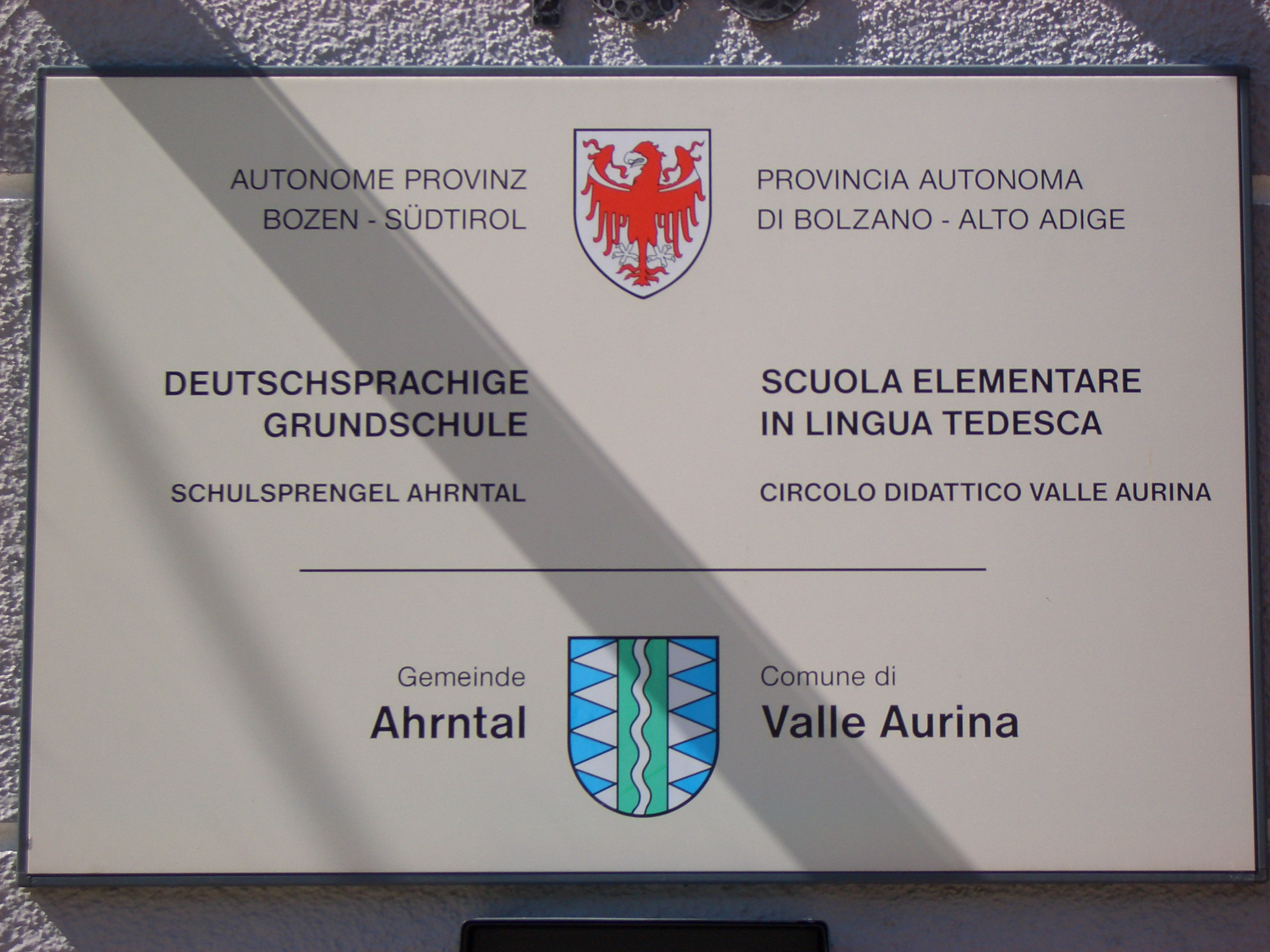
Sign of the German language primary school in St. Johann/Ahrntal

Siegfried Baur assesses the socio-linguistic foundations of second language acquisition with regard to three types of area:

- The urban areas (with an Italian population of approximately 40% to 70%) in which speakers of Italian and German have manifold opportunities to practice their respective second language
- The valley areas (with an Italian population of approximately 10% to 70%) in which the German-speaking has considerably fewer opportunities to practice Italian
- The rural areas/mountain areas, in which very few Italians live (less than 10%) and the German-speaking population treats Italian basically as a school subject and makes little use of the access to Italian media

== Second language competence ==
The only indicators for second language competence are found in the second language-tests in the school and state examinations.

In 2004, 50.8% of university graduates, 23.7% of maturità (A-Level) examinees, 36.2% of middle school-absolvents and 78.6% of oral candidates passed the second language exam. Statistical data may not be distributed across the various linguistic groups.

While German-speaking A-Level candidates from rural areas generally have very little second language competence in Italian, it seems that, on average, German-speaking candidates are slightly better at speaking Italian than vice versa. It should be noted, though, that this assessment is based on the personal experiences of examiners (themselves, of course, usually affiliated to one of the two linguistic groups).

Both German schools and Italian schools teach the respective second language from the first form.

== English language teaching ==
English language classes start in year 1 in Italian schools and in year 4 in German schools. There is no statistical data to evaluate English language competence of pupils in South Tyrol. The general impression of superintendents of schools and managers is that the German-speaking population often speaks better English than Italian.

== Second language acquisition in Ladin schools ==
Ladin-speaking pupils seem to be most successful in the acquisition of both Italian and German as second languages by far. This may be the result of a strictly bilingual language policy in which one half of the subjects is taught in Italian and the other half in German. Ladin is used only in elementary schools.

== Application of the Italian school system in South Tyrol ==
=== The Three Stages of the Italian school system ===
- Elementary school (Italian: scuola elementare, German: Volksschule; since 2003: scuola primaria, German: Grundschule): Years 1 to 5.
- Middle school (Italian: scuola secondaria di primo grado, more commonly referred to as scuola media; German: Mittelschule): Years 6 to 8.
- High School/Grammar School (Italian: liceo; German: Oberschule or Gymnasium): Years 9 to 13. The Italian liceo is traditionally subdivided in biennio (years 9 and 10) and triennio (11–13). Grammar schools in South Tyrol, as in all of Italy, address various directions of study, among which the most popular are the liceo classico/Klassisches Gymnasium (with special emphasis on Greek and Latin), liceo scientifico/Realgymnasium (emphasis on science), and liceo linguistico/Sprachengymnasium (emphasis on modern languages).

=== Compulsory education ===
Prior to 2000, compulsory education in Italy ended with the school leaving-examinations at the end of middle school. As of 2012, Italian pupils have to attend school for 12 years, while they can choose between liceo and a professional education including specialized schools.

== Bibliography ==
- Elisabeth Alber (2012). "South Tyrol's Education System: Plurilingual Answers for Monolinguistic Spheres?" In Dans L'Europe en Formation. N° 363, pp. 399–415 (online)

== See also ==
- History of South Tyrol
