= List of shipwrecks in March 1837 =

The list of shipwrecks in March 1837 includes ships sunk, foundered, wrecked, grounded, or otherwise lost during March 1837.

== 2 March ==
List of shipwrecks: 2 March 1837
Ship	State	Description
Gladiator	United Kingdom	The ship was driven ashore at Deal, Kent. She was on a voyage from New York, United States to London. Gladiator was refloated the next day.
Preciosa	United Kingdom	The ship ran aground on the Haisborough Sands, in the North Sea off the coast of Norfolk. She was on a voyage from Newcastle upon Tyne, Northumberland to Algiers, Algeria. Preciosa was refloated and taken in to Great Yarmouth, Norfolk.

== 3 March ==
List of shipwrecks: 3 March 1837
Ship	State	Description
Canton	United Kingdom	The ship was driven ashore in the Dardanelles. She was refloated on 18 March.

== 4 March ==
List of shipwrecks: 4 March 1837
Ship	State	Description
Devonport	United Kingdom	The ship was driven ashore at Cape Henelopen, Delaware, United States. She was on a voyage from Liverpool, Lancashire to Philadelphia, Pennsylvania, United States.
Lord Strangford	United Kingdom	The ship foundered in the Bristol Channel.
Maria	United Kingdom	The ship was wrecked in Algoa Bay.
Maria	Kingdom of Sardinia	The polacca capsized in a squall at Havana, Cuba. She was later righted.

== 5 March ==
List of shipwrecks: 5 March 1837
Ship	State	Description
Martha	United States	The ship was wrecked on Edisto Island, South Carolina. Her crew were rescued. She was on a voyage from Liverpool, Lancashire, United Kingdom to Charleston, South Carolina.
Walsingham	United Kingdom	The ship was driven ashore on an island. Her crew were rescued. She was on a voyage from Bermuda to the Turks Islands.

== 6 March ==
List of shipwrecks: 6 March 1837
Ship	State	Description
Graff Herman Wedel Jarlsberg	Norway	The ship was driven ashore at "Landfoort". Her crew were rescued. She was on a voyage from Dram to Amsterdam, North Holland, Netherlands.
Kensington or Kingston	United Kingdom	The brig was abandoned in the Atlantic Ocean (28°30′N 59°30′W) with the loss of her captain. She was on a voyage from British Honduras to Cork. Survivors were rescued by Orion (United States).

== 8 March ==
List of shipwrecks: 8 March 1837
Ship	State	Description
Petite Louise	France	The ship was wrecked on a reef off Cancún, Mexico. All on board were rescued.
Portia	United Kingdom	The barque ran aground and was wrecked at Capo d'Otranto, Kingdom of the Two Sicilies. Her crew were rescued. She was on a voyage from Ancona, Papal States to Malta

== 9 March ==
List of shipwrecks: 9 March 1837
Ship	State	Description
Davenport	United Kingdom	The ship was driven ashore on Hazard's Land, Pennsylvania, United States. She was on a voyage from Liverpool, Lancashire to Philadelphia, Pennsylvania.
Express	United Kingdom	The ship was wrecked in the Bay of Tangier.
Georgiana	Hamburg	The ship was wrecked near Texel, Netherlands. Her crew were rescued. She was on a voyage from Aux Cayes, Haiti to Hamburg.
Sophia	United Kingdom	The brig was wrecked on the Brazil Bank, in Liverpool Bay. Her crew were rescued by lifeboat. She was on a voyage from Valparaíso, Chile to Liverpool, Lancashire.

== 10 March ==
List of shipwrecks: 10 March 1837
Ship	State	Description
Arcade	United Kingdom	The ship was driven ashore on Bornholm, Denmark. She was on a voyage from Sunderland, County Durham to Memel, Prussia.
Maria	United Kingdom	The ship was wrecked in Algoa Bay.
Jane	United Kingdom	The ship was abandoned in the Atlantic Ocean off Madeira. All on board survived. She was on a voyage from Bristol, Gloucestershire to Philadelphia, Pennsylvania, United States.

== 11 March ==
List of shipwrecks: 11 March 1837
Ship	State	Description
Penrhos	United Kingdom	The barque foundered in the Atlantic Ocean (36°50′N 9°55′W). Her crew were rescued by the galiot Nieuwe Ondernehming (Netherlands). Penrhos was on a voyage from Swansea, Glamorgan to Syra, Greece.
Solace	United Kingdom	The ship struck a sunken wreck and sank in the North Sea off Thorpeness, Suffolk. Her crew were rescued.
St. John	United Kingdom	The ship ran aground off Dublin. She was on a voyage from Cádiz, Spain to Dublin.

== 12 March ==
List of shipwrecks: 12 March 1837
Ship	State	Description
Hamilton	United Kingdom	The ship sank at Milford Haven, Pembrokeshire. She was on a voyage from Waterford to Dublin.
Integrity	United Kingdom	The ship foundered off Bandon, County Cork. Her crew were rescued. She was on a voyage from Limerick to Troon, Ayrshire.
Jameson	United Kingdom	The ship was driven ashore at Sunderland, County Durham. She was refloated the next day.
Moro Castle	United Kingdom	The ship caught fire at New Orleans, Louisiana, United States and was scuttled. She was on a voyage from New Orleans to Havre de Grâce, Seine-Inférieure, France.

== 13 March ==
List of shipwrecks: 13 March 1837
Ship	State	Description
Arion	(Russian Empire) Grand Duchy of Finland	The ship was driven ashore on Mallorca, Spain. She was on a voyage from Helsingfors to Cette, Hérault, France or Livorno, Grand Duchy of Tuscany.
Integrity	United Kingdom	The ship foundered off "Bruneton Head". Her crew were rescued. She was on a voyage from Tarbert, Argyllshire to the Clyde.
Josephine	United States	The ship foundered off Ocracoke, North Carolina. Her crew were rescued. She was on a voyage from Rio de Janeiro, Brazil to Philadelphia, Pennsylvania.
Mary Ann	United States	The ship was abandoned in the Atlantic Ocean (23°00′N 82°30′W). Her crew were rescued by Judith and Esther (United Kingdom). Mary Ann was on a voyage from "Mancinella de Cuba", Cuba to New York.
Phœnix	Denmark	The brig was driven ashore at Sandy Hook, New Jersey, United States.
Prince of Saxe Coburg	United Kingdom	The ship was driven ashore at Margate, Kent. She was on a voyage from Rotterdam, South Holland, Netherlands to London.

== 14 March ==
List of shipwrecks: 14 March 1837
Ship	State	Description
Richard and Ann	United Kingdom	The collier, a brig, ran aground on the Heaps Bank, in the North Sea. Her crew were rescued by Good Agreement (United Kingdom). She was on a voyage from Newcastle upon Tyne, Northumberland to London. Richard and Ann later floated off and was taken into Burnham on Crouch, Essex.

== 15 March ==
List of shipwrecks: 15 March 1837
Ship	State	Description
America	United States	The ship was wrecked on the Riding Rocks, in the Bahamas. She was on a voyage from Jamaica to Grand Bahama.
Avon	United Kingdom	The sloop departed from Waterford for Bristol, Gloucestershire. Presumed subsequently foundered with the loss of all hands.
Triton	Norway	The whaler was driven ashore at "Langel".

== 16 March ==
List of shipwrecks: 16 March 1837
Ship	State	Description
Cortese	Kingdom of Sardinia	The polacca was wrecked at Madeira.
Margaret	United Kingdom	The ship was driven ashore on Møn, Denmark, where she was wrecked on 19 March with the loss of a crew member. She was on a voyage from Newcastle upon Tyne, Northumberland to Lübeck.
Ricargo	Spain	The ship was wrecked on Anegada, Virgin Islands. Her crew were rescued. She was on a voyage from Málaga to St. Thomas and Puerto Rico.
Sovereign	United Kingdom	The transport ship was driven ashore at Kileton, County Waterford. All on board were rescued. She was on a voyage from Woolwich, Kent to Waterford.

== 17 March ==
List of shipwrecks: 17 March 1837
Ship	State	Description
Marys	United Kingdom	The ship was wrecked at Catania, Sicily.

== 18 March ==
List of shipwrecks: 18 March 1837
Ship	State	Description
Limerick Lass	United Kingdom	The ship ran aground in the River Shannon. She was on a voyage from Limerick to Troon, Ayrshire.

== 19 March ==
List of shipwrecks: 19 March 1837
Ship	State	Description
Mary Ann	United Kingdom	The ship was driven ashore on Læsø, Denmark. She was on a voyage from Memel, Prussia to Hull, Yorkshire.

== 20 March ==
List of shipwrecks: 20 March 1837
Ship	State	Description
Amphion	United Kingdom	The ship was wrecked at Thiessow, Prussia. Her crew were rescued.
Thomas and Ann	United Kingdom	The ship was holed by her anchor and sank at Fosdyke Bridge, Lincolnshire.
Three Johannas	Prussia	The ship was driven ashore at "Caisbourg".

== 22 March ==
List of shipwrecks: 22 March 1837
Ship	State	Description
Etolle	Grand Duchy of Tuscany	The ship was driven ashore near Livorno. She was on a voyage from Alexandria, Egypt to Livorno.
Westminster	United Kingdom	The ship was driven ashore at New York, United States. She was on a voyage from London to New York. Westminster was refloated the next day and taken in to New York.

== 23 March ==
List of shipwrecks: 23 March 1837
Ship	State	Description
Commerce	United Kingdom	The ship was severely damaged by fire at New Orleans, Louisiana, United States.
Friend's Desire	United Kingdom	The ship capsized off Salcombe, Devon. Her crew were rescued. She was on a voyage from Plymouth to Torquay.
London	United Kingdom	The ran sloop aground on the Brake Sand, in the North Sea off the coast of Essex and sank. Her crew were rescued. She was on a voyage from Dartmouth, Devon to London.
Maria	United Kingdom	The ship ran aground on the Herd Sand, in the North Sea. She was on a voyage from South Shields, County Durham to London. Maria was refloated and put back to South Shields, where she sank.
Minerva	United Kingdom	The ship was driven ashore at Redcar, Yorkshire. She was on a voyage from Seaham, County Durham to King's Lynn, Norfolk. Minerva was later refloated and put in to Hartlepool, County Durham.
Nicholas I	Danzig	The ship was driven ashore near Danzig. Her crew were rescued. She was on a voyage from Danzig to Liverpool, Lancashire, United Kingdom. Nicholas I was refloated on 18 April and taken into Danzig.
Oato de Maio	Portugal	The hiate was driven ashore and wrecked on Terceira Island, Azores.
Watt	United Kingdom	The ship was driven ashore in the New Channel. She was on a voyage from Liverpool to Africa.
Will-o'-the-Wisp	United Kingdom	The ship was wrecked at São Miguel Island, Azores. Her crew were rescued.

== 24 March ==
List of shipwrecks: 24 March 1837
Ship	State	Description
Braddyll	United Kingdom	The sloop was wrecked near Whitby, Yorkshire. Her crew were rescued. She was on a voyage from Sunderland, County Durham Hartlepool, County Durham.
Thomas and Ann	United Kingdom	The ship was holed by her anchor and sank at Fosdyke Bridge, Lincolnshire.

== 25 March ==
List of shipwrecks: 25 March 1837
Ship	State	Description
Caroline	Hamburg	The ship was driven ashore by ice and wrecked at Pouch Cove, Newfoundland, British North America. Her crew survived. She was on a voyage from Hamburg to Saint John's, Newfoundland.
Elizabeth	Spain	The ship was driven ashore by ice and wrecked at Pouch Cove. Her crew survived. She was on a voyage from Cádiz to Saint John's.
Fortuna	Stralsund	The ship sank near Greifswald.
Hope	United Kingdom	The ship struck an iceberg and foundered. Her crew were rescued by Mary (Hamburg). She was on a voyage from Liverpool, Lancashire to Newfoundland, British North America.
James	United Kingdom	The ship was in collision with Mercury (United Kingdom) and sank off Pladda with the loss of two of her crew. Survivors were rescued by Mercury.
Jonge Alberdina	Stralsund	The ship was driven ashore on Hiddensee, Prussia.
Terrys	United Kingdom	The barque was driven ashore and wrecked on the east coast of Skagen, Denmark. She was on a voyage from Hull, Yorkshire to Memel, Prussia.
Waterloo	United Kingdom	The ship was driven ashore near Stettin with the loss of three of her crew. She was on a voyage from London to Memel, Prussia.

== 26 March ==
List of shipwrecks: 26 March 1837
Ship	State	Description
Bee	United Kingdom	The ship was driven ashore near Workington, Cumberland. She was refloated on 7 April and taken in to Workington.

== 27 March ==
List of shipwrecks: 27 March 1837
Ship	State	Description
Ann	United Kingdom	The ship was in collision with Mentor (United Kingdom) and foundered in the North Sea off Happisburgh, Norfolk. Her crew were rescued.

== 29 March ==
List of shipwrecks: 29 March 1837
Ship	State	Description
Nyverheid	Netherlands	The ship was struck by lightning and destroyed by fire in the Indian Ocean. All on board survived. She was on a voyage from Batavia, Netherlands East Indies to Rotterdam, South Holland.
Vigilance	Netherlands	The ship was driven ashore at Scheveningen, South Holland. Her crew were rescued. She was on a voyage from Gothenburg, Sweden to Rotterdam, South Holland.

== 30 March ==
List of shipwrecks: 30 March 1837
Ship	State	Description
Felicity	United Kingdom	The ship struck rocks and sank off Tarifa, Spain with the loss of three of her crew. She was on a voyage from Newcastle upon Tyne, Northumberland to Toulon, Var, France.

== 31 March ==
List of shipwrecks: 31 March 1837
Ship	State	Description
Candidus	United Kingdom	The ship was struck by lightning and destroyed by fire in the Atlantic Ocean. Her crew were rescued. She was on a voyage from New Orleans, Louisiana, United States to Liverpool, Lancashire.

== Unknown date ==
List of shipwrecks: Unknown date in March 1837
Ship	State	Description
Anna	United Kingdom	The ship was driven ashore on the coast of Cumberland. She was refloated on 7 March and taken in to Workington.
Bellerophon	United Kingdom	The ship sank near Marstrand, Sweden. Her crew were rescued. She was on a voyage from Amsterdam, North Holland, Netherlands to Pillau, Prussia.
Britannia	United Kingdom	The ship foundered in the Atlantic Ocean. Her crew were rescued. She was on a voyage from Bristol, Gloucestershire to Wilmington, Delaware, United States.
Chantarella	France	The ship was wrecked near Cherbourg, Seine-Inférieure before 9 March.
Fortuna	Peru-Bolivian Confederation	War of the Confederation: The brig was wrecked on the coast of Islay. Of her 71 crew, fifteen were drowned, 52 were taken prisoner and four escaped.
Franklin	United States	The schooner was abandoned in the Atlantic Ocean before 11 March with the loss of a crew member. Survivors were rescued by Nelson (United Kingdom).
Eliza Ann	United Kingdom	The ship was declared missing. She was on a voyage from London to Hamburg.
Frederica Louisa	Denmark	The ship was driven ashore near Pillau, Prussia. She was on a voyage from Copenhagen to Pillau. Frederica Louisa was refloated on 21 March and taken in to Pillau.
Friends	United Kingdom	The ship was run aground and sank off Terschelling, Friesland, Netherlands. She was on a voyage from Harlingen, Friesland to London.
Pandora	United Kingdom	The ship was abandoned in the Atlantic Ocean before 26 March.
HMS Pembroke	Royal Navy	The Vengeur-class ship of the line was driven ashore at Gibraltar. She was later refloated with assistance from the steamship Minos (France).
Richmond	(United Kingdom of Great Britain and Ireland) New South Wales	The schooner was wrecked in the Macleay River.
Rising Sun	United Kingdom	The ship was wrecked near South Shields, County Durham. Her crew were rescued.
Santarella	Flag unknown	The ship was wrecked near Cherbourg, Seine-Inférieure, France.
Véloce Messeneo	Kingdom of the Two Sicilies	The ship departed from Messina for Antwerp, Belgium in mid-March. No further trace, presumed foundered with the loss of all hands.
