= Italian Peninsula =

Peninsula in south-central Europe

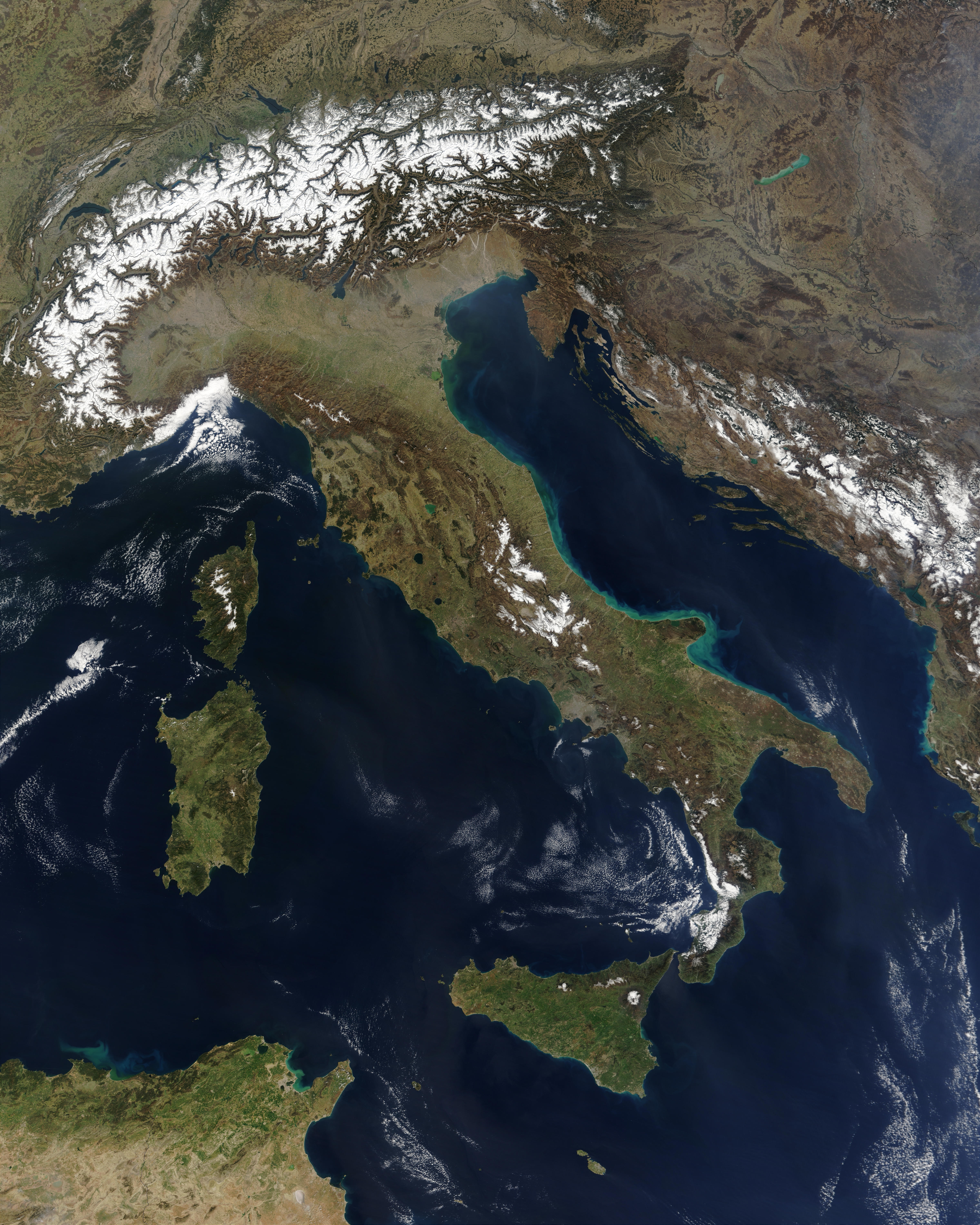
- Satellite view of the peninsula in March 2003
- Interactive map of Italian Peninsula

Geography
- Location: Italy; San Marino; Vatican City
- Coordinates: 42°00′N 14°00′E
- Adjacent to: Ligurian Sea; Ionian Sea; Adriatic Sea; Tyrrhenian Sea; Mediterranean Sea
- Area: 131,275 km^{2} (50,686 sq mi)

Demographics
- Population: 26,172,716 (Note: Excluding Northern Italy)
- Languages: Italian
- Ethnic groups: Italians

The Italian Peninsula (Italian: penisola italiana) is located within the Italian geographical region; it extends from the southern Alps in the north to the central Mediterranean Sea in the south which comprises much of the country of Italy and the enclaved microstates of San Marino and Vatican City. The peninsula is also known as the Italic Peninsula (Italian: penisola italica), Apennine Peninsula, Italian Boot, or Mainland Italy.

== Overview ==
It is nicknamed lo Stivale ("the Boot"), because the shape of the peninsula resembles a high-heeled boot. Three smaller peninsulas contribute to this characteristic shape, namely Calabria ("the Toe"), Salento ("the Heel") and Gargano ("the Spur"). The backbone of the Italian Peninsula consists of the Apennine Mountains, from which it takes one of its names. The Peninsula comprises much of Italy and also includes the enclaved microstates of San Marino and Vatican City.

== Physical geography ==
Minimum extent (excluding Northern Italy) of the Italian peninsula in dark green and maximum extent (including Northern Italy) in light green

Geographically, the minimum extent of the Italian Peninsula consists of the land south of a line extending from the Magra to the Rubicon rivers, north of the Tuscan–Emilian Apennines. It excludes the Po Valley and the southern slopes of the Alps. The Italian Peninsula has the only active volcano on continental Europe, Mount Vesuvius.

== Political geography ==
In general discourse, "Italy" and the "Italian Peninsula" are often used as synonymous terms. However, northern Italy may be excluded from the Italian Peninsula. From a political point of view, the Italian Peninsula in the strict sense (therefore excluding insular Italy and northern Italy) is divided into various states listed in the following table:

Country	Population		Peninsular area			Density	Description
Country	Number	Share	km^{2}	sq mi	Share	Density	Description
Italy	26,140,000	99.8750%	131,275	50,686	99.9531%	199.12 people/km^{2}	Virtually the entire peninsula
San Marino	31,887	0.1218%	61.2	23.6	0.0466%	521.03 people/km^{2}	A central-eastern enclave of peninsular Italy
Vatican City	829	0.0032%	0.49	0.19	0.0003%	1,691.84 people/km^{2}	An enclave of Rome, Italy
Total	26,172,716	100%	131,337	50,709	100%	199.28 people/km^{2}	

== See also ==
- Apennine Mountains
- Italy
- Italy (geographical region)
- List of peninsulas
- San Marino
- Southern Europe
- Vatican City
