= Punta Palascia Lighthouse =

Punta Palascia
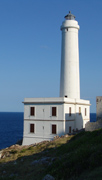
- Punta Palascia Lighthouse
- Location: Otranto; Apulia; Italy
- Coordinates: 40°06′27″N 18°31′12″E

Tower
- Constructed: 1867
- Construction: stone tower
- Height: 32 m (105 ft)
- Shape: cylindrical tower with balcony and lantern atop a 2-storey keeper’s house
- Markings: white tower, grey lantern dome
- Power source: mains electricity
- Operator: City of Otranto

Light
- Deactivated: 1970s–2008
- Focal height: 60 m (200 ft)
- Lens: type TD
- Intensity: AL 1000 W
- Range: main: 18 nmi (33 km) reserve: 12 nmi (22 km)
- Characteristic: Fl W 5 s
- Italy no.: 3596 E.F.

Punta Palascia Lighthouse (Italian: Faro di Punta Palascia) is an active lighthouse located in Capo d'Otranto, which is the easternmost point in Italy and the narrowest point of Strait of Otranto at the mouth of Adriatic Sea.

== Description ==
The lighthouse was built in 1867 and abandoned in the 1970s, however, was reopened in 2008 and currently hosts the Centre on Environment and Health of the Mediterranean Ecosystems and a multimedia Museum of the Sea. The lighthouse consists of a white stone cylindrical tower, 32 metres (105 ft) high, with balcony and lantern rising from a two-storey white building. The lantern is positioned at 60 metres (200 ft) above sea level and emits one white flash in a five-second period visible at distances up to 18 nautical miles (33 kilometres). The lighthouse is fully automated and is managed by the Marina Militare and is identified by the code number 1983 E.F.

The lighthouse is one of five Mediterranean lighthouses protected by the European Commission. It is open to guided tours for visitors, particularly at New Year, since it stands at the eastern point of Italy where the dawn of the New Year can be seen before the rest of the country.

== See also ==
- List of lighthouses in Italy
- Capo d'Otranto
