= Glockenkarkopf =

Mountain in Italy

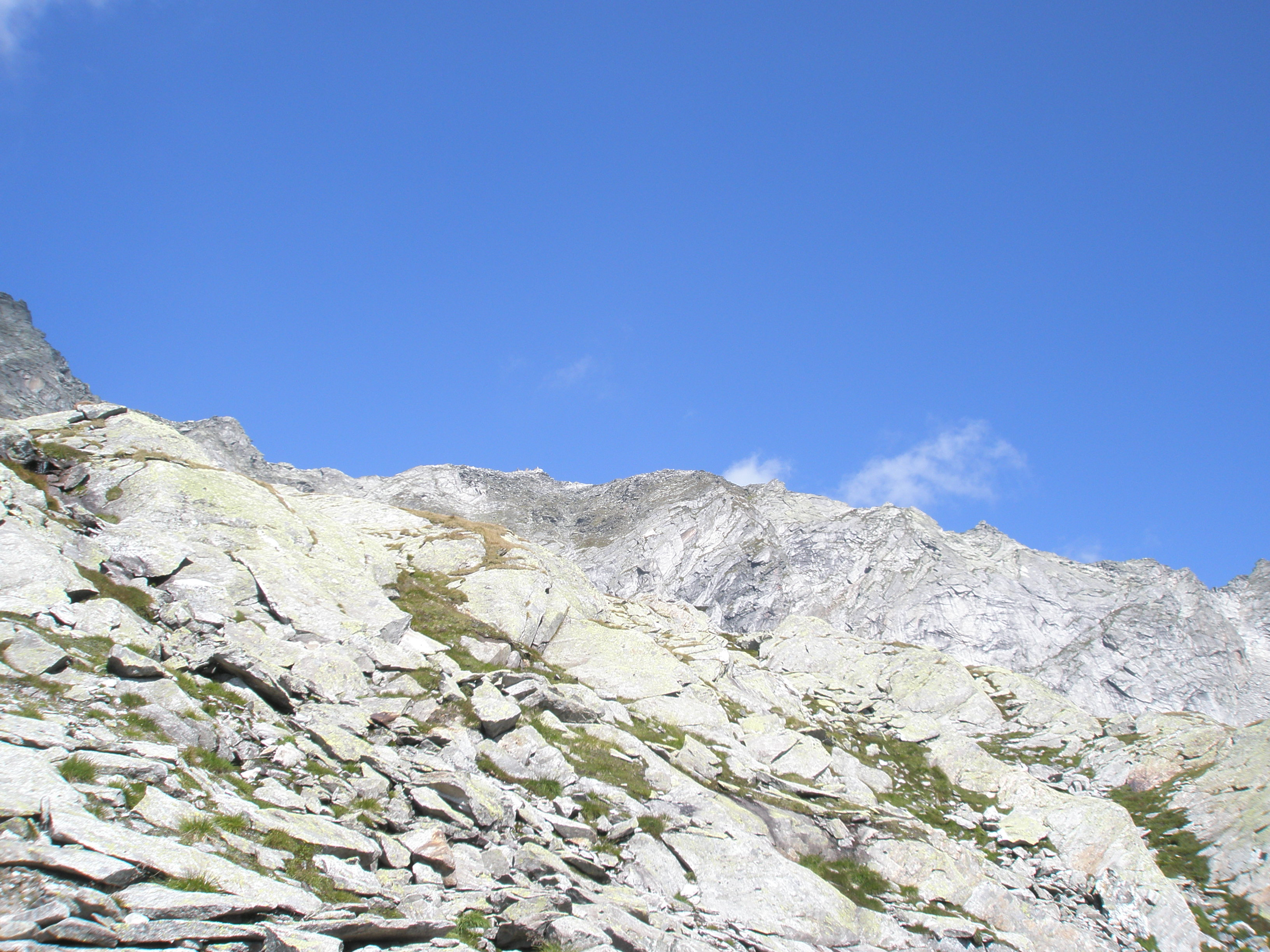
- View towards the summit

Highest point
- Elevation: 2,911 m (9,551 ft)
- Coordinates: 47°05′28″N 12°10′50″E

Geography
- Location within Alps
- Location: Salzburg (state), Austria, South Tyrol, Italy
- Parent range: Zillertal Alps

Climbing
- First ascent: 1895 by Franz Hofer and Fritz Koegl

The Glockenkarkopf (also known as Klockerkarkopf, Italian Vetta d'Italia) is a mountain of 2,911 metres (9,551 ft) in the Zillertal Alps on the border between the Austrian state Salzburg and the Italian province of South Tyrol.

== Location ==
The ridgeline of Glockenkarkopf forms the international border extending between two mountain passes, Krimmler Tauern in the west and Birnlücke (Forcella del Picco) in the east. Nearby summits include the slightly higher Pfaffenschneidkopf (2918 m) to the southwest, and the Westliches Zwillingsköpfl (2835 m) to the northeast.

== History ==
The first known ascent of the Glockenkarkopf was made on 10 July 1895 by Franz Hofer and Fritz Koegl, who published an account of their tour in the journal of the Österreichischer Alpenverein in 1897.

The summit, despite being part of Austria-Hungary at that time, gained a particular significance for the Italian nationalist, irredentist, and later fascist Ettore Tolomei, who climbed the Glockenkarkopf with his brother Ferruccio Tolomei, Elvira and Ilda Tomasi, led by the mountain guide Franz Gasser from Prettau, on 16 July 1904. Tolomei believed to have reached the northernmost point of the Adriatic Sea's drainage basin in the Alps, and — in accordance with his natural border theory — therefore considered the peak to rightfully belong to the Italian nation state. Since he also declared himself to be the first ascensionist, Tolomei deemed it legitimate to rename the summit Vetta d'Italia, literally "Peak of Italy". Besides the fact that the Glockenkarkopf had already been ascended before Tolomei, his excursion had yet another flaw: He had misidentified the northernmost point of the Adriatic Sea's drainage basin in the Alps, which is in fact the Westliches Zwillingsköpfl (2835 m), a bit more than 400 m to the northeast.

Tolomei's name is used in Italian maps from 1905 onward. Since 1920, in the aftermath of the Treaty of Saint-Germain-en-Laye, the Austria–Italy border runs indeed over the summit of the Glockenkarkopf. According to Austrian nobleman and political theorist Erik von Kuehnelt-Leddihn, United States president Woodrow Wilson was poorly knowledgeable about European geography and history, and allegedly had been convinced by the name "Vetta d'Italia" of the legitimacy of Italy's claim to the region.

== Toponyms ==
Researchers pointed out that "Klockerkarkopf" (not Glockenkarkopf) is the older and correct name, being derived from the nearby "Klockeralm".

The Italian name "Vetta d'Italia" is widely rejected by the German-speaking population of South Tyrol, given its origin and political implications. In 1989, politician and peace activist Alexander Langer symbolically renamed the peak Europagipfel – Vetta d’Europa, literally "Peak of Europe".

== Literature ==
- Klier, Heinrich; Klier, Henriette; Klier, Walter (1990). Alpenvereinsführer Zillertaler Alpen. Munich: München Rother. ISBN 3-7633-1201-3.
