= Ettore Tolomei =

Italian fascist politician (1865–1952)

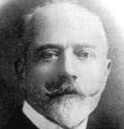
Ettore Tolomei

Ettore Tolomei (16 August 1865, in Rovereto – 25 May 1952, in Rome) was an Italian nationalist and fascist. He was designated a Member of the Italian Senate in 1923, and ennobled as Conte della Vetta in 1937.

== Pre-World War I activism ==
Born into a nationalistically oriented family (that rejected the Austrian domination of his Trentino and supported the Italian irredentism), after his studies in Florence and Rome Tolomei became associated with the nationalistic Dante Alighieri Society. After graduation in 1888 he taught in Italian schools at Tunis, Thessaloniki, İzmir and Cairo. He returned to Italy in 1901 and was appointed Inspector General of Italian Schools Abroad by the Foreign Ministry's Office.

His nationalistic activities had begun in 1890 with the founding of the weekly magazine La Nazione Italiana (The Italian Nation), a propagandistic publication whose aim was to popularize the positions of the Dante Alighieri Society. Its articles dwelled mainly on the issue of Trento and Trieste, then still under Austro-Hungarian rule, but covered other areas including the Levant and North Africa, anticipating the fascist dream of a new Mediterranean empire.

As the end of the century neared, Tolomei's activities began to focus on the northern boundaries of Italy. To him, this natural boundary was the main watershed of the Alps near Reschen Pass and Brenner Pass, even though few Italians lived in this mostly German-speaking area of the Austrian Empire.

In this early phase, he saw the Ladins (a group speaking a Rhaeto-Romance language which inhabited the mountainous areas in what was then the eastern part of Southern Tyrol, a territory now divided between South Tyrol, Trentino and the province of Belluno) as the Latin element through which "an Italian-Ladinic wedge" could be driven into the Germanic-speaking region, which in those days he called Alto Trentino – Upper Trentino, not having yet devised the name Alto Adige – High Adige, a creation which would become the official Italian designation for the province after World War I up to this day.

In 1904 Tolomei climbed the 2,911 m (9,551 ft) high Klockerkarkopf or Glockenkarkopf, which he believed to be the northernmost mountain on the main watershed in the Tyrolean Alps. In fact, the northernmost point of the Adrian drainage basin is not the Klockerkarkopf, but the nearby Westliches Zwillingsköpfl. Tolomei claimed to be the first climber and renamed the peak Vetta d'Italia – Summit of Italy (with a clear political aim), although Franz Hofer and Fritz Kögl had already climbed it in 1895. It is not clear whether Tolomei was aware of Kögl's ascent or not, although an extensive article about it had appeared in the Austrian Alpine Club magazine. Italian maps later adopted this name. According to a legend U.S President Woodrow Wilson, for this reason believed that South Tyrol was an Italian land. In 1938 Tolomei was given the title "Conte della Vetta" (Count of the Summit) by the Italian King Vittorio Emanuele III.

To further his goals, in 1906 Tolomei founded the Archivio per l'Alto Adige, a magazine which moved along the same propagandistic lines as La Nazione Italiana, but focused solely on the South Tyrolean issue. The Archivio propagated the Italianness of South Tyrol in articles that claimed scientific authority and objectivity, but were in fact deeply tinged with ideology and propagandistic intent, and for Tolomei a tool for personal promotion and narcissistic gratification. An important instrument in the struggle for the Italianization of South Tyrol, apart from the scholarly articles in the Archivio per l'Alto Adige which soon enjoyed a large readership in Italy, was the creation of an Italian name for every village and geographical feature in South Tyrol. As World War I neared, toponymy assumed increasing importance. The toponymic studies were presented as a re-Italianization of names which, according to Tolomei and his collaborators, had been Germanized not many generations before. The result of these activities, called Prontuario dei nomi locali dell'Alto Adige, would be published in 1916 by the Reale Società Geografica Italiana la prima .

== Activities during World War I ==
In 1914, at the outbreak of World War I, Tolomei fled to Rome in order to avoid being drafted by the Austrian army. By this time, he had succeeded in giving the region between the Brenner pass and the Salurner Klause an appearance of Italianness. The Archivio had become the reference work for all matters regarding South Tyrol, and during the war became the sole source of information for Italians. The idea of an Italian legal entitlement to South Tyrol had become generally accepted.

As Italy joined the war on the side of the Allies in 1915, Tolomei joined the Italian armed forces under the pseudonym "Eugenio Treponti", to avoid being executed as a traitor if caught by the Austrians. He was immediately assigned to the Chiefs of Staff committee. The Archivio continued to appear as Serie di Guerra – War series, printed in Rome. The spectrum of the topics changed, and most articles were now written by Tolomei himself. As a result, the magazine's propagandistic intentions became more obvious. From 1915 onwards, Tolomei increased his lobbying activities, sending several letters to government officials and nationalistic associations detailing his views on the steps to be taken before and after the annexation of South Tyrol. He anticipated that German speakers would assimilate to the Italian language and culture, although there were already thoughts of a possible resettlement. Also in 1915, he published his programmatic points for the "annexation and adaptation" of South Tyrol in the Archivio per l'Alto Adige. In its Volume 11 of 1916 appeared the Prontuario dei nomi locali dell'Alto Adige, a translation of over 10,000 village and place names. "[...] for the first time, the entirety of the indigenous nomenclature of place names, including the names of geographical features and farmsteads, were transformed into another language through one man's act of will".

In 1916 and 1917, he collaborated with the Istituto Geografico De Agostini (now De Agostini) to prepare maps for the region which would show it as being part of Italy. These maps were used by the Italian delegation at the Paris Peace Conference, strengthening the impression that this was really an old Italian region.

After the occupation of Tyrol by Italian troops, Tolomei vigorously advocated decisive measures to radically alter the ethnic situation so that South Tyrol would become permanently Italian. Although he was nominated Commissario alla Lingua ed alla Cultura in Alto Adige – Commissioner for language and culture in Alto Adige, during the first postwar years his suggestions were not received well by the liberal administration. His big moment would only arrive with the fascist takeover of the Italian state.

== Post-World War I career ==
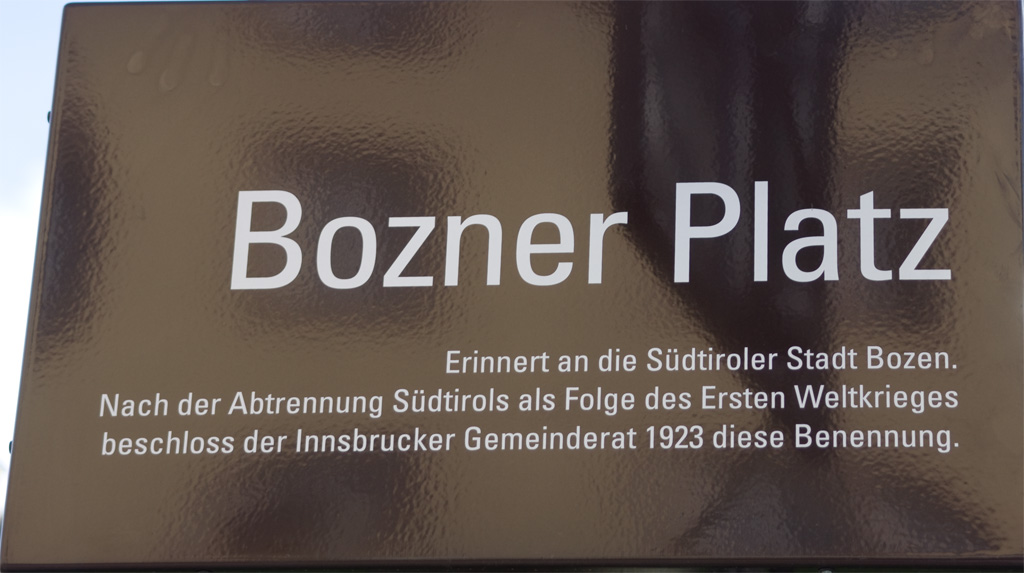
Street sign in Innsbruck, North Tyrol, commemorating the city of Bozen, set up in 1923 in response to the prohibition of the original southern Tyrolean place names.

Shortly after Italian troops had occupied the southern part of Tyrol in the wake of the Austrian-Italian Armistice of Villa Giusti in November 1918 (which was confirmed by the Treaty of St. Germain in 1919), Tolomei was appointed to a cultural office in the main city of the area, Bozen (Bolzano).

On 2 October 1922, Tolomei led a group of Blackshirts when they occupied the town hall of Bolzano and managed to persuade the Civil commissioner Luigi Credaro to depose the mayor; the following day they moved to Trento and, using similar tactics, obtained the suppression of the administrative Provincial assembly and, after Credaro's and minister Salandra's dismissals that of the entire Central office for the new provinces. It was 'de facto' the end of all democratic policies in the area of Trentino-Alto Adige/Südtirol between the wars: supported by Benito Mussolini, Tolomei enforced his policy of Italianization from 1923 onwards. The names of some 8,000 towns and places were changed, and Italian was made the only official language. His program totalled 32 points, publicly presented by Tolomei in Bolzano's Civic Theatre in July 1923, of which some of the most salient were:

- prohibition of the name "Tirol", and any variation of the same;
- closure of German-language schools;
- dissolution of parties specific to the German-speaking community;
- imposition of Italian as the only official language;
- closure of German-language press.

In 1939, his work led to the South Tyrol Option Agreement that forced people to choose between remaining in Italy or emigrating to the Third Reich, the so-called "Option für Deutschland".

In 1943, when Italy surrendered, he was seized by German forces and deported, first to the Dachau concentration camp then to a sanatorium in Thuringia.

Because of his policies of enforcing Italian names on towns in South Tyrol, he is denigrated as "the gravedigger of South Tyrol" by the German-speaking group in the area.
