= Rocca di Chardonnet =

Mountain in the Cozie Alps, France

- Roche du Chardonnet, Monte Chardonnet
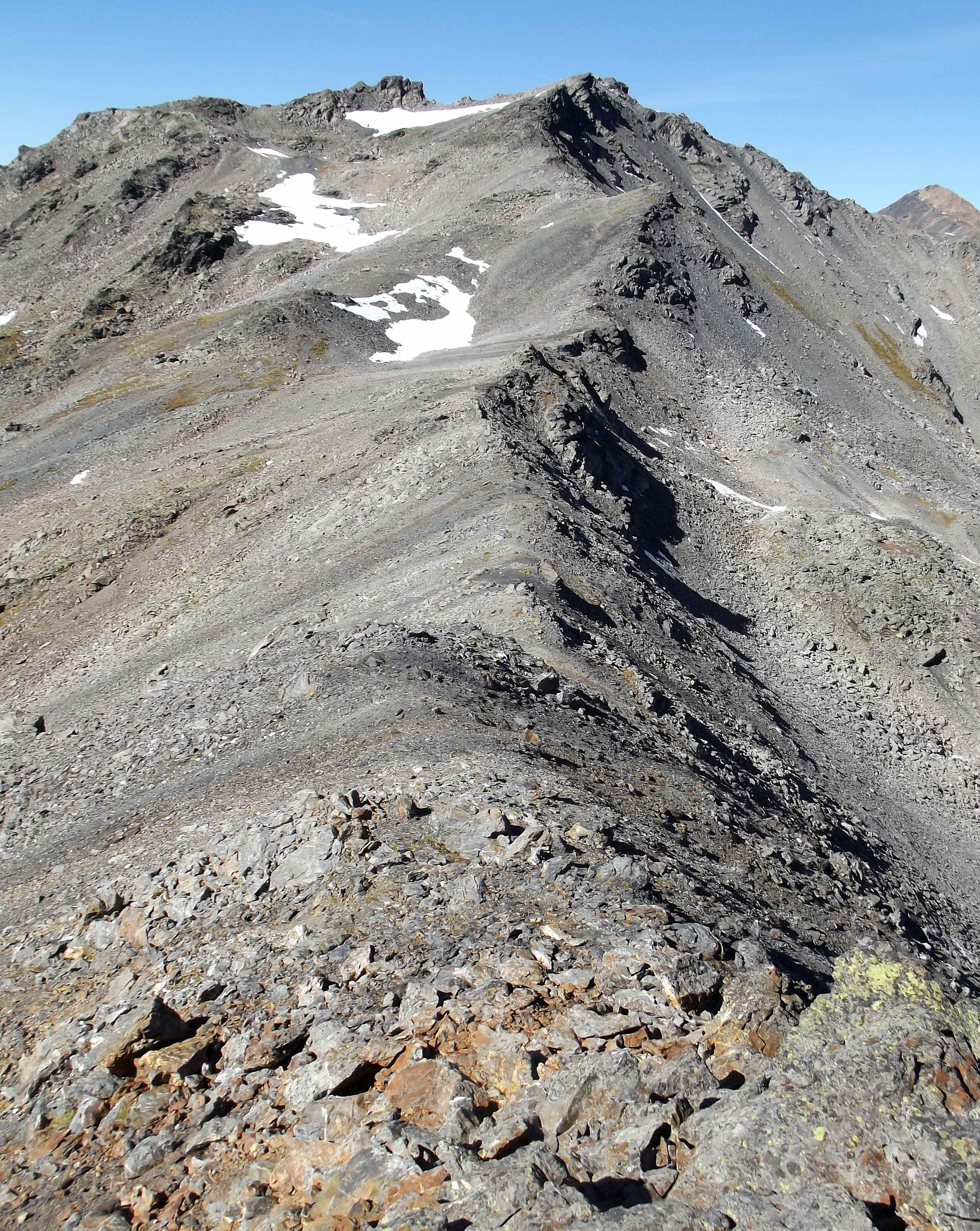
- Rocca di Chardonnet and Col des Muandes

Highest point
- Prominence: 88 m (289 ft)
- Isolation: 1.04 km (0.65 mi)
- Coordinates: 45.101554°N 6.548681°E

Geography
- Country: France
- Region(s): Auvergne-Rhône-Alpes; Provence-Alpes-Côte d'Azur
- Parent range: Alps

The Rocca di Chardonnet (2,950 m a.s.l. - in French Roche du Chardonnet) is a mountain in the Mont Cenis within the Cottian Alps. It is located in the French department of Hautes-Alpes. The mountain lies between the Valle Stretta, a lateral valley of the Val di Susa, and the Clarée Valley southwest of Mont Thabor. It represents the tripoint where the basins of the Po, the Durance, and the Isère converge.

== Description ==
The mountain is situated at the convergence of the three aforementioned ridges: the western ridge, which separates the Clarée Valley from the Neuvache valley (a tributary of the Arc), the northeastern ridge, which connects it to Mont Thabor while separating the latter valley from the Valle Stretta, and the southern ridge, which, via the Col des Muandes and the Rochers de l’Aigle, links Rocca di Chardonnet to Rocca Gran Tempesta. Numerous alpine lakes surround the mountain, including Lake Chardonnet to the southeast (Valle Stretta), the Lacs des Glaciers to the north, and the Lacs de la Madeleine toward Névache. Administratively, the area is divided between the commune of Névache (Hautes-Alpes) and that of Valmeinier (Savoie).

The two slopes of Rocca di Chardonnet located south of the main watershed are part of the champ de tir de Rochilles Mont Thabor, a zone used for military exercises by the French Army. During such exercises, access to the area is restricted to unauthorized persons.

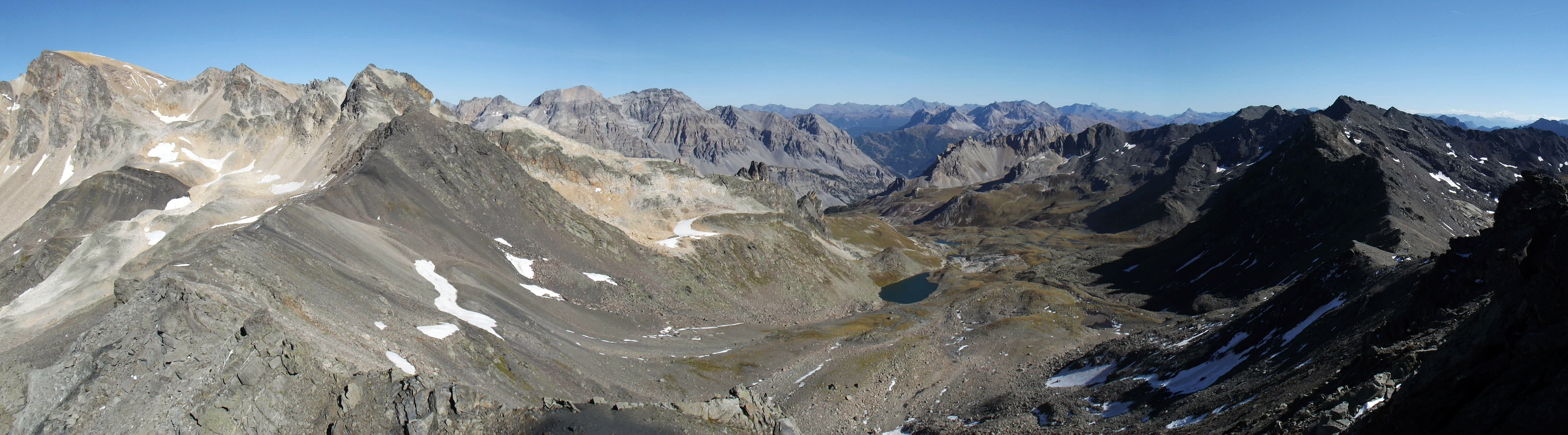
Panorama toward the Valle Stretta

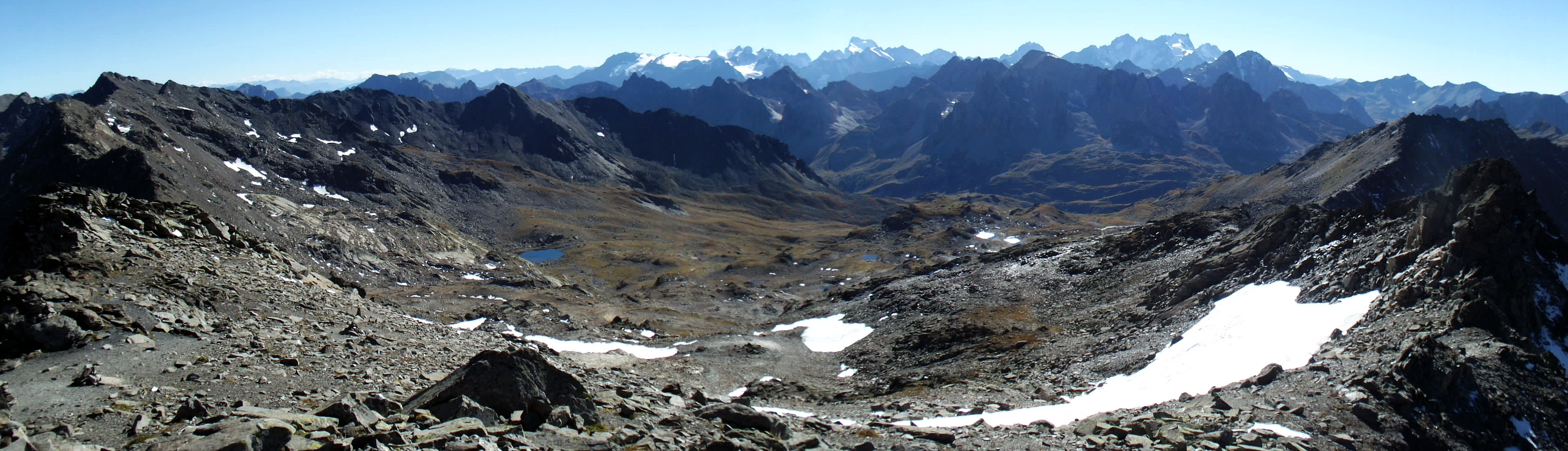
Panorama toward the Clarée Valley

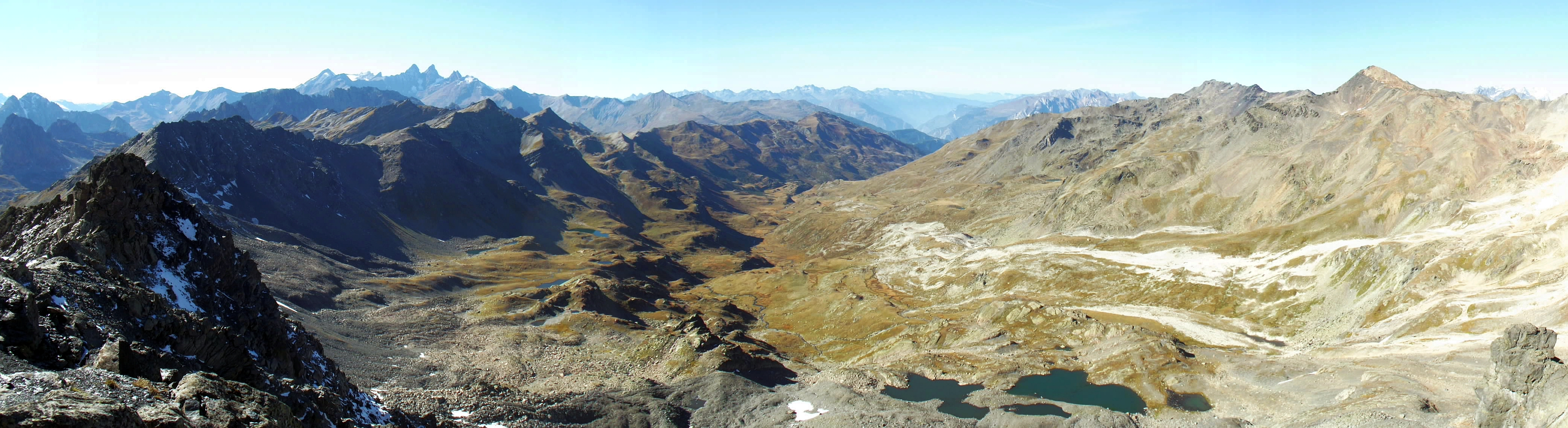
Panorama toward the Maurienne

== History ==
The summit marked the border between Italy and France until 1947. The Treaty of Paris, signed after World War II, shifted the border to the start of the Valle Stretta. Until then, it was the westernmost point of Italy, and it still constitutes the westernmost point of the Italian geographical region.

== Access to the summit ==
=== Summer access ===
The mountain can be reached via a trail that closely follows the southern ridge from the Col des Muandes, which can be accessed, also by trail, from the Refuge des Drayères (Clarée Valley floor) or from the Valle Stretta. The route is considered to have a hiking difficulty of E.

Access via the other two ridges of the mountain (the east-northeast ridge connecting to the Col de Valmeinier and the southwest ridge starting from the Col de Névache) also presents no mountaineering difficulties.

=== Winter access ===
The mountain is also accessible with ski mountaineering skis or snowshoes. The ascent from the Valle Stretta side with snowshoes is considered to have a difficulty of BR (experienced snowshoers).

== Bibliography ==
- R. Aruga - P. Losana - A. Re (1985). Alpi Cozie Settentrionali [Northern Cottian Alps] (in Italian). San Donato Milanese: CAI-TCI. pp. 181–182, 386, 397.

=== Cartography ===
- Cartografia ufficiale francese dell'Institut géographique national (IGN), available online
- Istituto Geografico Centrale - Carta dei sentieri e dei rifugi scale 1:50,000 no. 1 Valli di Susa Chison e Germanasca and 1:25,000 no. 104 Bardonecchia Monte Thabor Sauze d'Oulx
