= Katakombenschule =

Clandestine German-medium schools in Italy in the 1920s

Katakombenschulen (catacomb schools) were clandestine schools established in Italian South Tyrol during the 1920s period of Fascist Italianization.

Teaching of and in the German language was banned (Lex Gentile, October 1923) by the authorities of Italy, which had occupied the area in 1918. Approximately 30,000 students in 324 schools were affected, including the dissolution of German nursery schools and all higher German language based educational institutions.

German-speaking school teachers in the province were replaced by Italian-speakers. German language based education went underground when private lessons were banned in November 1925. The main organizers were, among many others, priest Michael Gamper and lawyer Dr Josef Noldin. School books were smuggled from farm to farm and lessons taught by the dismissed German teachers; they were augmented by approximately 500 young female volunteers. The Katakombenschulen focused on the teaching of writing and reading in German. The penalty for being found out was prison and repeatedly caught teachers were deported to South Italy. The 25-year-old teacher Angela Nikoletti died from tuberculosis during a prison term. Josef Noldin was deported to Lipari in 1927.

After the signing of the Lateran Treaty in 1929, German language religious lessons on Sunday were allowed.

== Literature ==
- Stefan Lechner (2003). „Die Eroberung der Fremdstämmigen“: Provinzfaschismus in Südtirol 1921–1926. Wagner: Innsbruck. ISBN 978-3-7030-0398-1 (= Veröffentlichungen des Südtiroler Landesarchivs. Vol. 20).
- Maria Villgrater (2004). Katakombenschule. Bozen, Athesia 1984.
- Andrea Bonoldi, Hannes Obermair (2006). Tra Roma e Bolzano / Zwischen Rom und Bozen. Staat und Provinz im italienischen Faschismus. Bozen: Stadt Bozen 2006. ISBN 88-901870-9-3.

== See also ==
- Krifo scholio, the secret Greek schools during Ottoman rule.
- Ikastolak, the Basque-language schools initially illegal in Spain.
