= Michael Gamper =

Canon Michael Gamper (1885–1956) was an Austrian priest seen as a hero of the Tyrol between the world wars. He is an important figure in the disputed zone between what is now Austria and Italy. He was editor of the papers Südtiroler Volksbote and Dolomiten.

== Life ==
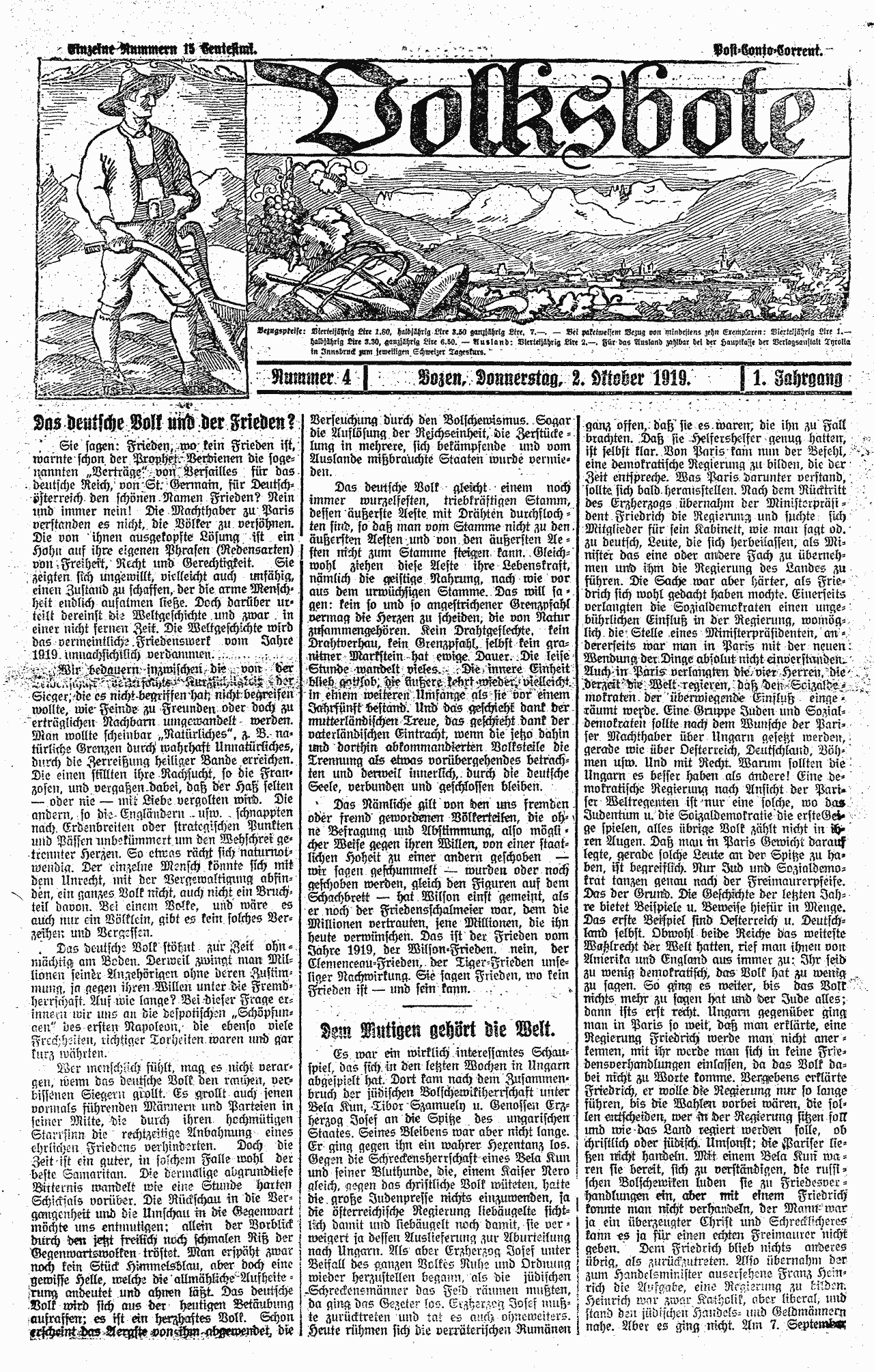
Michael Gamper's Volksboten, 2. Oktober 1919

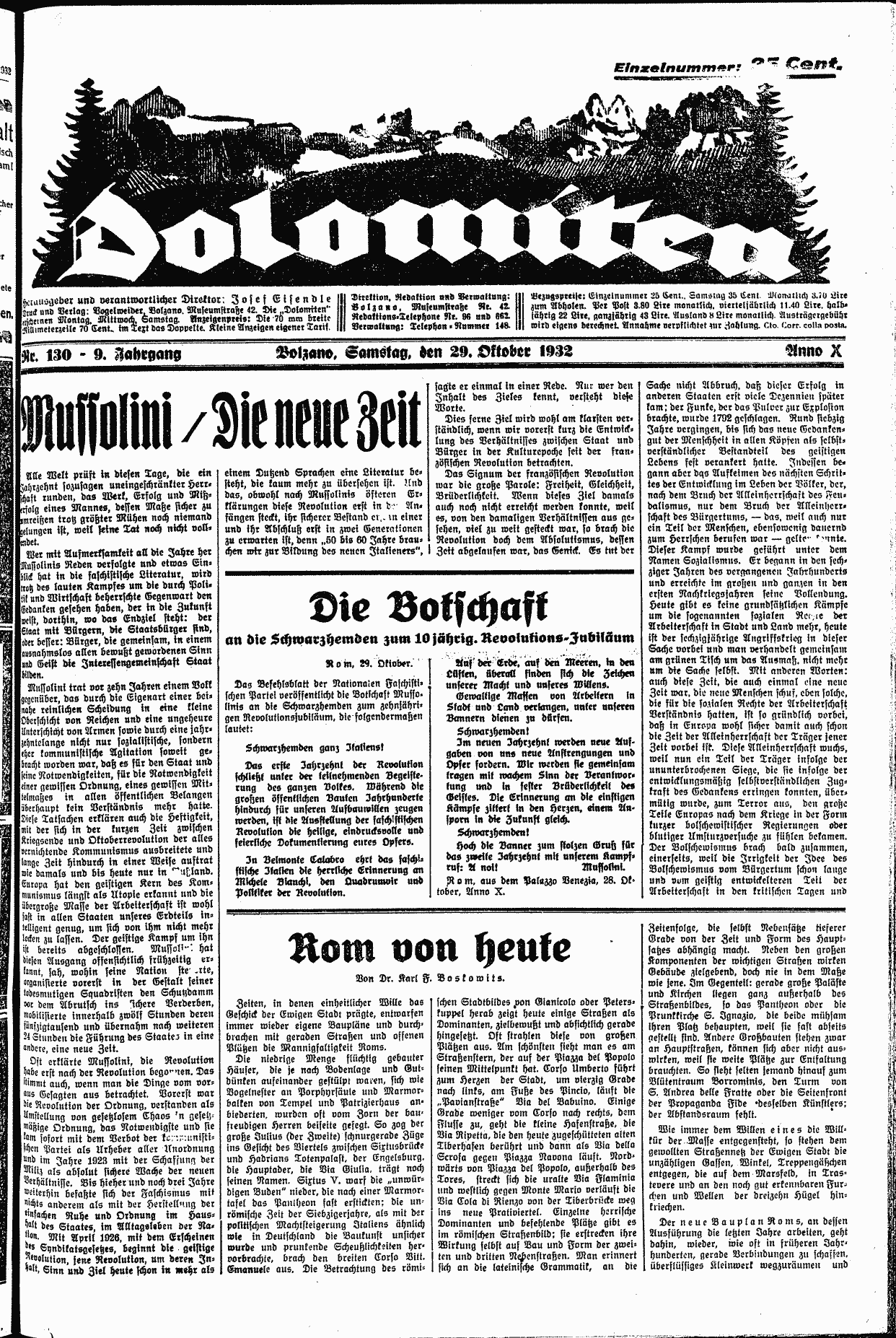
"Dolomiten"

Gamper was born on 7 April 1885 in Tisens in the southern Alps, the eldest son of Michael Anton Gamper, a blacksmith and his wife Elisabeth Sulzer. He was one of six children.

He was educated at the Benedictine High School in Merano then went to the University of Innsbruck to study Theology. He was a member of the student club Asthasia, which combining drinking with discussion. On completion he went to a seminary in Trento. He thereafter was ordained in 1908 and worked as a priest in several small communities: Girlan, Altrei, Laives and Barbian.

In 1914, aged 29, he was promoted to Canon and moved to the city of Bolzano. Here he met Aemilian Creator who asked him to become editor of a new newspaper the Südtiroler Volksbote (South Tyrolean People's Messenger).

In the aftermath of the First World War the southern part of the County of Tyrol was annexed to Italy and the speaking of German was banned in the traditionally German-speaking areas of South Tyrol. This complicated the lives of locals. Catacomb schools were set up to secretly teach German to the children. One of his female assistants Angela Nicoletti died aged 25 during this period.

Although the Volksbote was banned due to its use of German. His political stance as editor is hard to categorise: He was strongly anti-social democrat and strongly anti-communist, but (due to his religion rather than his politics) he was also anti-Semitic. Therefore, he was strongly "middle of the road". Critically he just desired autonomy and recognition of the remote German-speaking regions without kowtowing to the German nation.

In 1921 he became president of the local branch of publisher Tyrolia Verlag, which was renamed Athesia. In 1924 he wrote in protest at the murder of local school teacher Franz Innerhoffer by fascists at a local festival (which had gone unpunished).

In 1925 he got permission from the Vatican to start printing a German-language newspaper again and launched Dolomiten (The Dolomites). It was first published on Christmas Day 1926.

In 1933 Hitler took power. Hitler annexed Austria and the South Tyroleans initially saw him as a potential liberator. Other issues arose from the Nazi regime and Gamper began speaking out against the German euthanasia policy being adopted against disabled children (Action T4). Gamper was one of the first to publish an article regarding his concerns, with the title of "A Terrible Suspicion".

In 1939 South Tyroleans were forced to take an "option": either to emigrate to the German Reich, or stay and become fully Italian. Residents had to choose before 31 December 1939 whether to be German or Italian. Those choosing German would be rehoused. Gamper strongly resisted this. Most residents picked to go to Germany, but the population became very divided. Gampers sought to reunite the population before it depopulated.

In 1943, when Mussolini's government fell, the Germans invaded the northern section of Italy in Operation Axis in order to retain Axis control. This soft invasion included the South Tyrol.

Under this new regime, Gamper went to Florence disguised as a German SS officer with one true officer aiding him. He then made his way to Rome. He got a note sent out via Vatican to President Roosevelt, who then realises that not all Germans are pro-Nazi.

At the end of the war he was very dissatisfied with the Paris Treaty as it did not contain scope for self-determination.

He died of liver cancer at home in Bolzano on 15 April 1956. A crowd of 30,000 attended his funeral on April 19, over half of the local population.

His niece Martha Flies and her husband Toni Ebner took his place as editor of Dolomiten and his publishing house Athesia. This couple continued to campaign for autonomy.

== Legacy ==
Numerous streets are named after Gamper in the South Tyrol, including Bolzano, Klobenstein, Laives, Ritten and Lienz.

Multiple schools in the South Tyrol bear his name.

In 1972 South Tyrol became autonomous.

In 2014 a film of Gamper's mission was released, Heimat Sudtirol: The Mission of Michael Gamper, with Ricardo Angelini in the title role.

== Publications ==
- Athanasius (1927)
- The South Tyrol Jubilee (1946)
- The German Ethnic Group of the South Tyrol, Yesterday and Today (1954)
