= Capo d'Otranto =

Italy's most easterly point

Punta Palascia Lighthouse
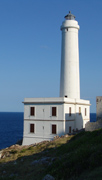
- Location: Otranto, Italy
- Coordinates: 40°06′27″N 18°31′12″E

Tower
- Constructed: 1867
- Height: 32 m (105 ft)
- Power source: mains electricity

Light
- Deactivated: 1970
- Focal height: 60 m (200 ft)
- Range: 15 nmi (28 km; 17 mi)
- Characteristic: Fl W 5s

Cape Palascìa, commonly known as Capo d'Otranto, is Italy's most easterly point. It is situated in the territory of the Apulian city of Otranto, in the Province of Lecce at 40° 7' northing and 18° 31' easting.

== Lighthouse ==
The lighthouse was built in 1867 and abandoned in the 1970s, but it was reopened to tourists in 2008 and currently hosts the Centre on Environment and Health of the Mediterranean ecosystems and a multimedia museum of the sea. It is one of five Mediterranean lighthouses protected by the European Commission. It is often visited by tourists, particularly during the New Year, since it stands at the point where the dawn of the new year may first be seen in Italy.

According to nautical conventions, Capo d'Otranto marks the point that the Ionian Sea and the Adriatic Sea meet.

== See also ==
- Punta Palascia Lighthouse
