= Westliches Zwillingsköpfl =

Mountain in Italy

- Location within Alps

Highest point
- Elevation: 2,835 m (9,301 ft)
- Coordinates: 47°09′21″N 12°18′59″E

Geography
- Location: Salzburg (state), Austria, South Tyrol, Italy
- Parent range: Zillertal Alps

The Westliches Zwillingsköpfl (also Westlicher Zwillingskopf, Italian Testa Gemella Occidentale, all of them literally meaning "Western Twin Head"), is a 2,835-metre (9,301 ft) mountain peak on the border of Italy and Austria. The Westliches Zwillingsköpfl is the northernmost point of Italy, even though the nearby Glockenkarkopf (Italian Vetta d'Italia) is often considered to hold this distinction. The first known ascent of the Westliches Zwillingsköpfl was made on 9 July 1895 by Franz Hofer and Fritz Koegl, who published an account of their tour in the journal of the Österreichischer Alpenverein in 1897.

== Location ==
The Westliches Zwillingsköpfl is located on the main ridge of the Zillertal Alps. To the north the slopes fall into the Krimmler Achental in the Austrian state Salzburg, to the south into the Ahrn Valley around the territory of the municipality of Prettau in South Tyrol (Italy).

== See also ==
- Tauferer Ahrntal
