= Florio (surname) =

Florio is an Italian surname. Notable people with the surname include:

- Alba Florio (1910–2011), Italian poet
- Aldo Florio (1925–2016), Italian filmmaker
- Antonio Florio (born 1946), Italian conductor
- Claudia Florio (born 1946), Italian filmmaker
- Dan Florio, American boxing trainer
- Ermanno Florio (born 1954), Italian-born Canadian conductor
- Franca Florio (1873–1950), Italian noblewoman, socialite during the Belle Époque
- Franco Florio (footballer) (born 1976), Italian midfielder
- Franco Florio (athlete) (born 2000), Argentine sprinter and rugby player
- Giulia Florio (1870–1947), Italian noblewoman
- Ignazio Florio Sr. (1838–1891), Italian entrepreneur and politician, son of Vinzenco Sr., member of the Florio family
- Ignazio Florio Jr. (1869–1957), Italian entrepreneur, son of Ignazio Sr., member of the Florio family
- Italo Florio (born 1953), Italian footballer
- James Florio (1937–2022), American politician, 49th governor of New Jersey
- John Florio (1553–1625), linguist and lexicographer
- José Florio (1924–2009), Argentine footballer
- Luigi Florio (born 1953), Italian politician
- Michelangelo Florio (1515–1572) Italian Franciscan friar convert to Protestantism, pastor in England and Switzerland, and father of John Florio
- Roberto Florio (1929–1993), Argentine singer
- Rudy Florio (born 1950), Canadian football player
- Vincenzo Florio Sr. (1799–1868), Italian entrepreneur and politician, founder of the rich Florio economic dynasty, one of the wealthiest Sicilian families during the late 19th century
- Vincenzo Florio (1883–1959), Italian industrialist and founder of two automobile races, son of Ignazio Sr.

== See also ==
- Florio family
