= Monument to Ignazio Florio, Palermo =

Monumento a Ignazio Florio
- Interactive map of Monumento a Ignazio Florio
- Location: Piazza Florio, Palermo
- Coordinates: 38°07′30″N 13°21′37″E
- Material: Marble and bronze
- Completion date: 1896
- Dedicated date: 1904
- Dedicated to: Ignazio Florio Senior

The Monument to Ignazio Florio is a bronze monumental sculpture, dedicated to the Sicilian industrialist, erected in 1909 on Piazza Florio, in Palermo, Sicily.

== History ==
The bronze statue of Ignazio Florio Senior (1838 - 1891) was commissioned by a committee of workers. The design was by the architect G. Damiani Almeyda, and the bronze statue sculpted by Benedetto Civiletti and stands on a marble plinth. At the unveiling, three hundred workers from the Florio factory in Marsala were present. A similar monument had been built in 1896 in Favignana by sculptor Francesco Cocchiara. A marble monument dedicated to his father Vincenzo Florio Senior is located in front of the Palazzo Forcella De Seta, facing the Foro Italico at the intersection of Piazza della Kalsa and Viale Stradale 113.
