= Franco Florio =

Franco Florio may refer to:

- Franco Florio (footballer) (born 1976), Italian footballer
- Franco Florio (athlete) (born 2000), Argentine sprinter and rugby sevens player
