= Vincenzo Florio =

Italian entrepreneur and racing driver (1883–1959)

Vincenzo Florio Jr.
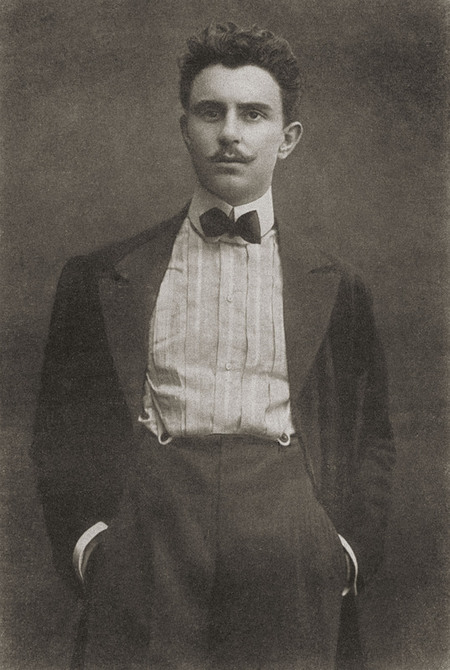
- Vincenzo Florio Jr. in 1905
- Born: 18 March 1883; Palermo, Kingdom of Italy
- Died: 6 January 1959 (aged 75); Épernay, France
- Occupations: Entrepreneur and racecar driver
- Known for: Member of the Florio family and founder of the Targa Florio

Vincenzo Florio Jr. (18 March 1883 – 6 January 1959) was an Italian entrepreneur, heir of the rich Florio entrepreneurial dynasty, one of the wealthiest Italian families during the late 19th century. An automobile enthusiast, he is best known as the founder of the Targa Florio.

== Early life ==
He was the son of the Senator of the Kingdom of Italy, Ignazio Florio Sr. and baroness Giovanna D'Ondes Trigona. He was born in Palermo and was named after his grandfather Vincenzo Florio Sr. (1799–1886), the founder of the Florio wine and spice company. He was the younger brother of Ignazio Florio Jr.. Not inclined to business, he loved travelling and was a frequent visitor to Paris, Nice, Montecarlo and Cannes. Luxury boats were one of his passions: in the family, they owned five yachts. In 1909, he married principessa Annina Alliata di Montereale. After she died from cholera in 1911, he married Lucie Henry of Épernay, France, a year later.

== Career ==
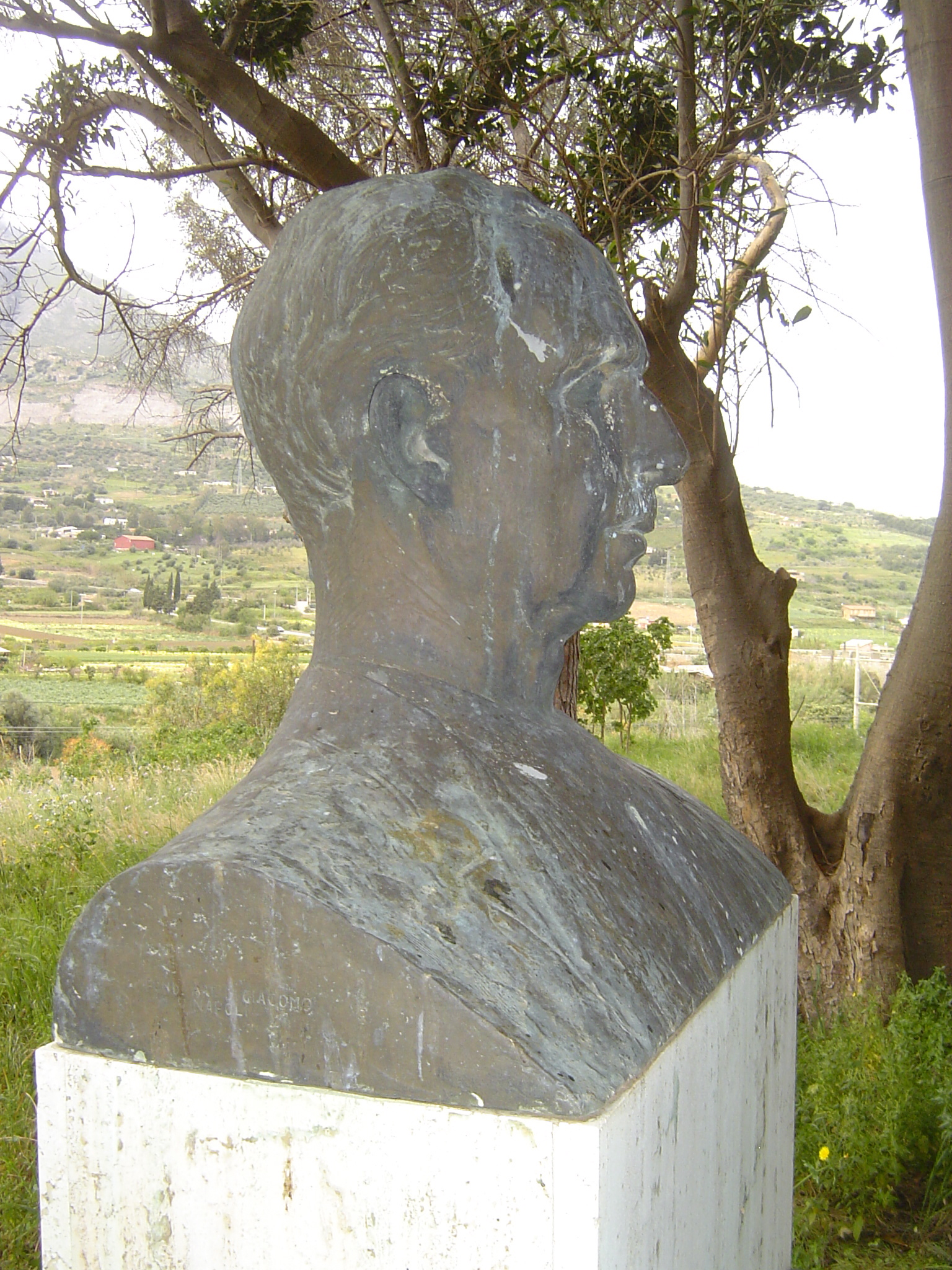
Buste of Vincenzo Florio, located between the spectators balconies at the Targa Florio pitcomplex

An automobile enthusiast, he created a real racing team with Felice Nazzaro and organised races that remained famous. Florio initiated the financial basis and the engineering plans for the "Brescia Motor Week" in Brescia, Lombardy. He had finished third in the 1904 edition, and generously funded the 1905 race, which was renamed Coppa Florio. He donated 50,000 lire and a Cup for the winner.

His greatest fame came from creating the Targa Florio race in 1906, based on discussions with James Gordon Bennett Jr. and Henri Desgrange. The Targa also claimed to be a worldly event not to be missed. Renowned artists, such as Alexandre Charpentier and Leonardo Bistolfi, were commissioned to design medals. A magazine was initiated, Rapiditas, which aimed to enhance, with graphic and photographic reproductions of the race, the myth of the car and the typical character of modern life, speed.

Florio also raced himself. His best result was the win in the Targa Rignano (Padua - Bovolenta) 1903, named after Count Rignano, thus inspiring Florio to pick the surname-based Targa Florio. His own racing team, however, got Felice Nazzaro to leave Fiat and join as driver, who had won the 1907 race. In 1913, Vincenzo Florio founded the Automobile Club of Sicily, of which he remained president for a long time.

== Death ==
He died at Épernay, France. He is buried in the family chapel, in the cemetery of Santa Maria di Gesù.

== Commemoration ==
Florio was also a painter. The exhibition Vincenzo Florio – A taste for modernity was on display in Palermo in 2003.
