= Tonnara di Favignana =

Tonnara of Favignana
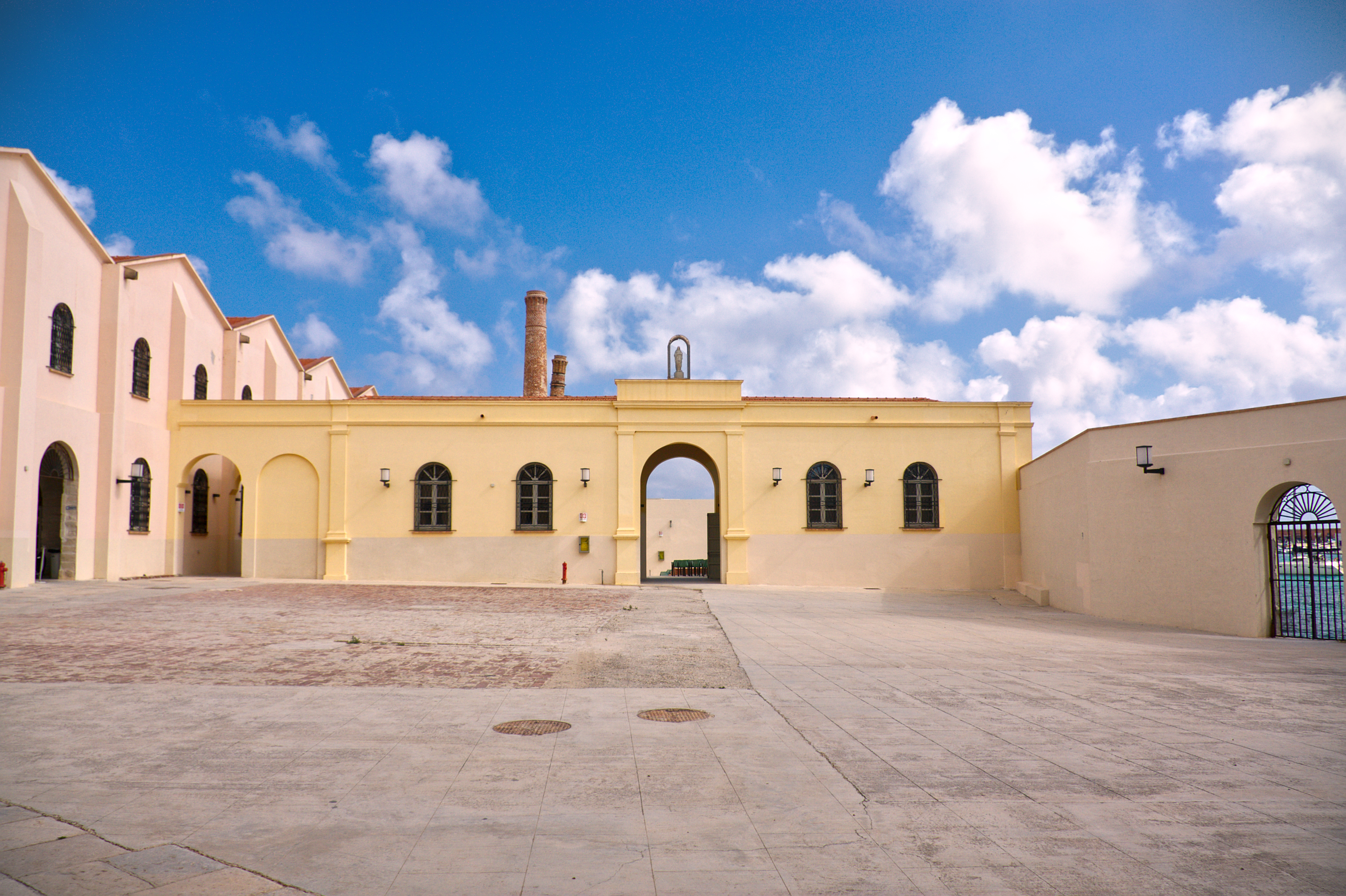
- The courtyard of the tonnara.
- Interactive map of the Tonnara of Favignana area

General information
- Coordinates: 37.930348°N 12.32268°E
- Inaugurated: 1859
- Closed: 1977

The Tonnara of Favignana, officially known as the Ex Stabilimento Florio delle tonnare di Favignana e Formica (English: Former Florio Tuna Fishery of Favignana and Formica), is a historic tuna fishery located on the island of Favignana, which is part of the Aegadian Islands off the west coast of Sicily, Italy.

== History ==
The Tonnara of Favignana was established in 1859 by the wealthy Florio family and was in operation until 1977. It was one of the largest tuna fisheries in the Mediterranean.

In the early 2000s, the tonnara was restored and converted into a museum.
