= Florio family =

Sicilian entrepreneurial family

Coordinates: 37.7869142°N 12.443026°E

Florio
- Italian entrepreneurial family from Sicily
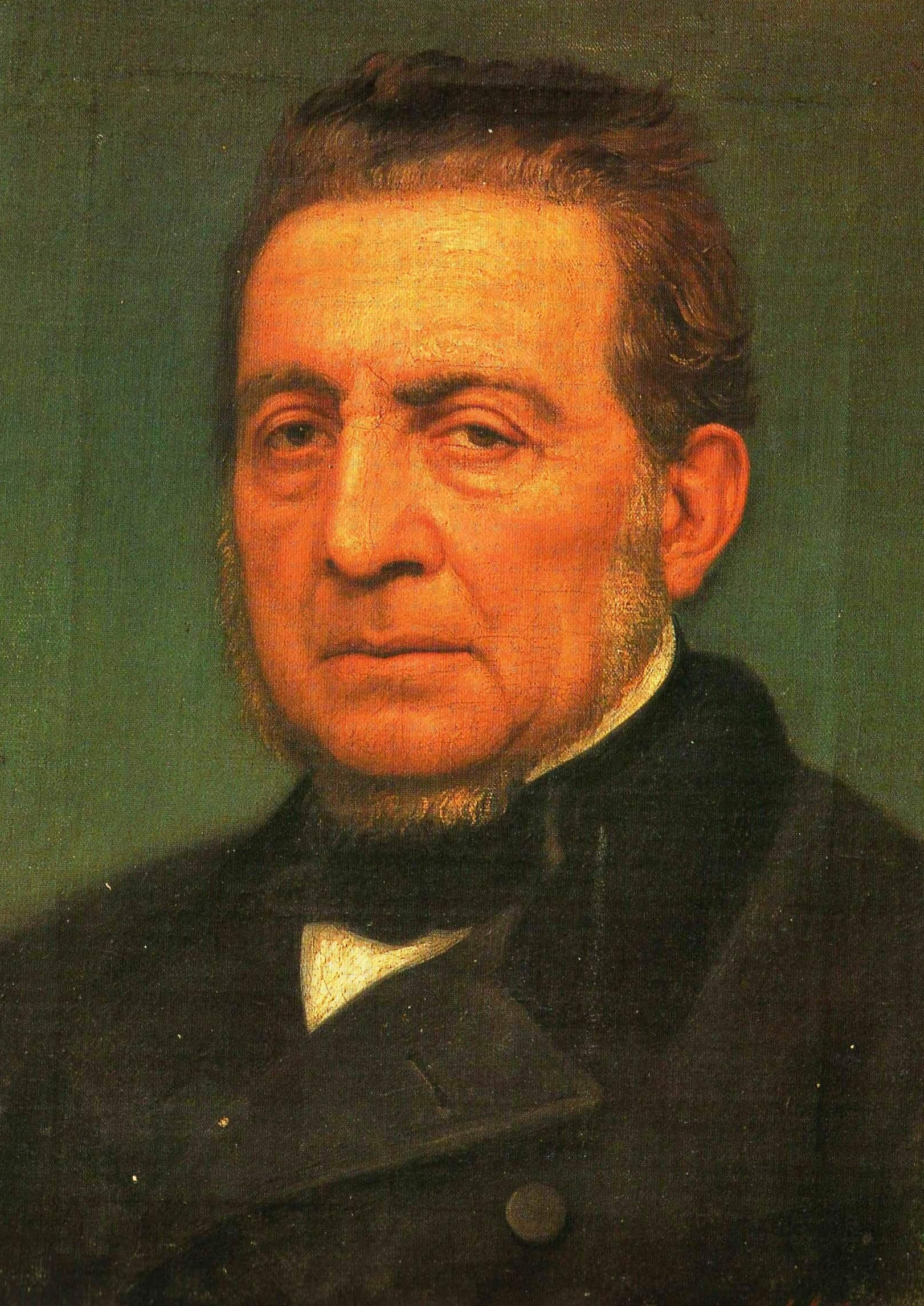
- Vincenzo Florio (1799–1868), the founder of the family business
- Current region: Sicily
- Founded: 1830s
- Founder: Vincenzo Florio Sr. (1799–1868)
- Members: Ignazio Florio Sr. (1838-1891); Ignazio Florio Jr. (1869–1957); Vincenzo Florio (1883–1959)
- Connected members: Franca Florio (1873–1950)
- Dissolution: 1935
- Cadet branches: Florio winery (Cantine Florio) (Marsala wine); Tonnara di Favignana, tuna fishery; Anglo-Sicilian Sulfur Company Limited; Florio shipping line (merged into Navigazione Generale Italiana); Cantiere navale di Palermo (Palermo Shipyard); L'Ora newspaper; Targa Florio, one of the oldest car races in the world

The Florio family was a prominent entrepreneurial Italian family who started many lucrative activities in Sicily involving the export of Sicilian products (such as Marsala wine) in the 19th century, in some ways redeeming Sicily from feudal immobility. The family extended its interests to shipping, shipbuilding, fisheries, mining, metallurgy and ceramics. The Florio economic dynasty was one of the wealthiest Italian families during the late 19th century. In the heyday of the Florio business empire, reportedly some 16,000 people depended on the family, and the press sometimes referred to Palermo as 'Floriopolis'.

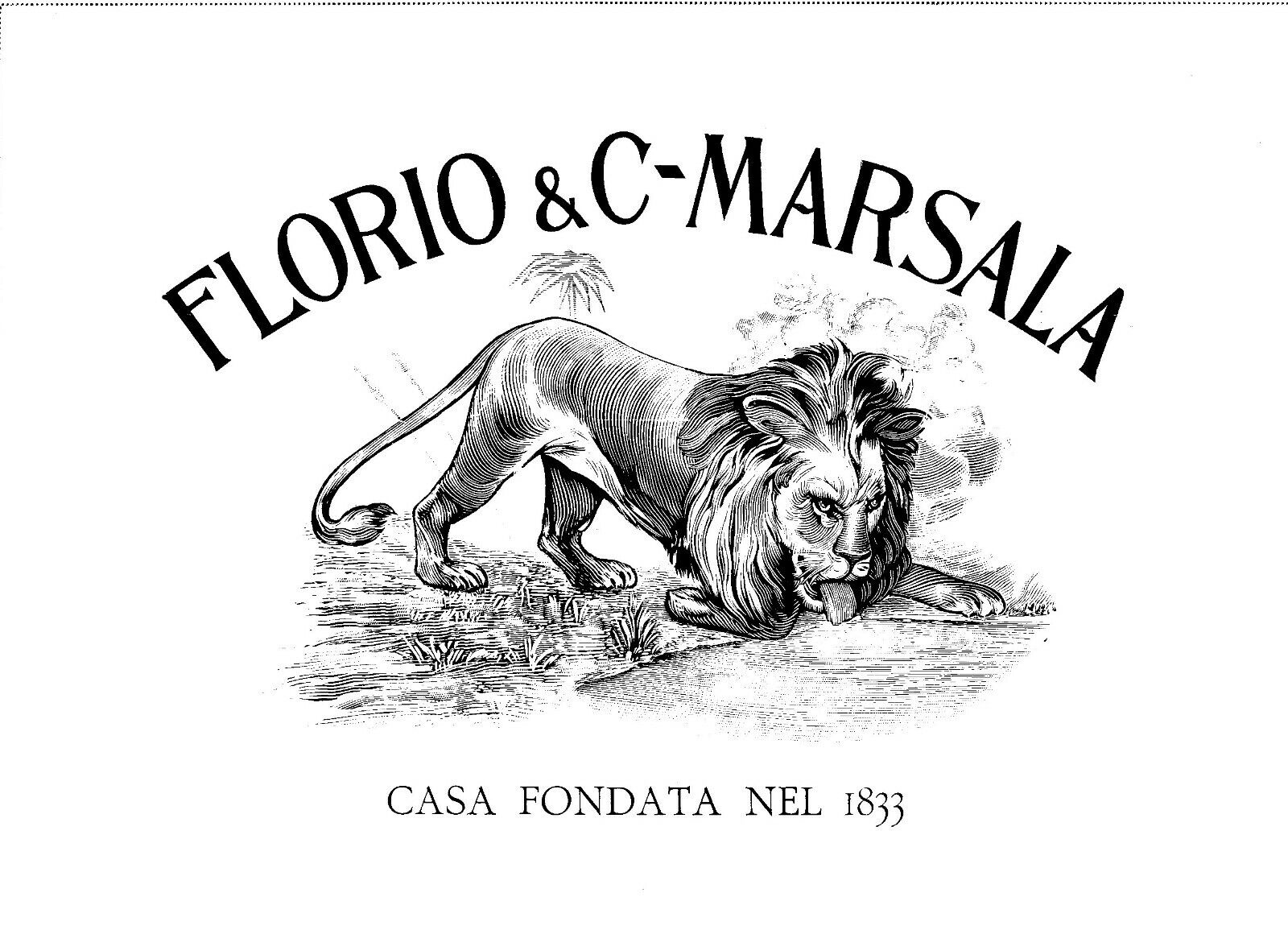
Symbol of the Florio family companies - a lion drinking from the spring

== Rise and decline ==
=== First generation: The beginning ===
The Florio family originally came from Bagnara, a town in the province of Calabria. Paolo Florio (1772-1807) saw no future in his hometown after an earthquake in 1783 and left in late 1799 with his wife Giuseppina Saffiotti, and their several-month-old son Vincenzo and Paolo's brother Ignazio (1776-1828) for Palermo, where he started a shop selling herbs, spices and quinine. The shop became a success because of the pure quinine they supplied. When Paolo died in 1807, Ignazio continued the business and took charge of Vincenzo's education. The financial legacy of Vincenzo and his uncle tripled in the decade between 1807 and 1817. The childless Ignazio died in 1829 and left all his assets to Paolo's son, his nephew Vincenzo Florio Sr. (1799-1868).

=== Second generation: Expansion ===
Vincenzo Florio Sr. immediately set a much faster pace in the family business, considerably expanding the scope of his activities well beyond the drug and spice shop. He gave an impulse to the family businesses by expanding the tuna fishing and its canned preparation in Palermo. In 1832, he established a factory of Marsala wine and, in 1841, the Oretea foundry it. As a ship owner, he promoted the development of maritime communications with the continent, building numerous steamers.

Florio also invested in the sulfur trade, mainly to the British Empire. In 1840, he co-founded Anglo-Sicilian Sulfur Company Limited in Palermo with the British entrepreneurs Benjamin Ingham – also engaged in Marsala wineries – and Agostino Porry, for the production and marketing of sulfuric acid and sulfur derivatives. In 1841, he founded the Oretea foundry. His business acumen was such that he became the intermediary for the city of Palermo of the bank of the Rothschild family and as the founder of Banco Florio, he himself became a renowned banker in Palermo and Sicily with many aristocratic families and the upper middle class.

=== Third generation: Consolidation ===
His son Ignazio Florio Sr. (1838-1891) considerably developed all the other industries founded by his father. After the death of his father, in 1868, he resolved the problems related to the division of inheritance that could have resulted in the liquidation of the flourishing enterprise. In 1874, he purchased the island of Favignana and the whole archipelago of the Aegadian Islands in order to expand the tuna business.

With the merger of the Florio fleet into the Navigazione Generale Italiana when The New York Times described the Florios as the "merchant princes of Europe", the family was part of the narrow elite of the great Italian entrepreneurs and was at the top of the international high-society, a reference point in Palermo not only for the high aristocracy, but also for the rulers who increasingly visited the city in the second half of the 19th century.

=== Fourth generation: Decline ===
At his death in 1891, Ignazio Sr. left his two sons, Ignazio Florio Jr. and Vincenzo Florio, with assets valued at around 100 million lire. The eldest son, Ignazio Junior, succeeded his father in running the family business. He acted as a patron of the arts in Palermo, financing and monitoring the progress of various projects and making the Sicilian city an important meeting point for the international jet set of the time. His wife, Francesca Paola Jacona della Motta dei baroni di San Giuliano was known as the "Queen of Palermo", as she became a prominent protagonist of the Belle Époque in Palermo.

However, In the beginning of the 1900s, as international competition increased and the economic importance was moving to the north of Italy, to the cities of Milan, Turin and Genoa, the family had to face an increasingly deteriorated economic reality resulting in bankruptcies and closures of activity. Despite the increasing economic difficulties, the Florios maintained their expensive way of life. After the sale of Villa Florio all'Olivuzza in 1924, the family moved to Rome. Between 1925 and 1935, the economic collapse deprived Ignazio Junior of all his assets. In 1935, Donna Franca's jewels, furniture and real estate were auctioned in Palermo.

With the generation of the sons of Ignazio Jr., the third Ignazio and Vincenzo, the House of Florio reached the height of fame and prestige, but also the beginning of a dramatic decline. From the highs during the belle époque, with the splendours of the family and the triumphs of Ignazio's beautiful wife, the mythical Franca Florio, sung about by poets and immortalised by the most prestigious artists of the time. To the lows of the bankruptcy of the family's immense economic empire, which, between revivals and relapses, would slowly wear away between 1908 and 1935, finally leaving them in the most squalid and painful misery.

The rise and decline of the Florio family is mentioned as a good example of the Buddenbrooks syndrome, referring to the novel Buddenbrooks by German author Thomas Mann, the 1929 Nobel Prize in Literature, published in 1901. The Buddenbrooks syndrome is used by business historians to explain the inability of a family business dynasty to survive beyond the third generation:

The first generation of proprietors supposedly possesses the pioneering character, striving for money and creating a successful business. The second generation, it is alleged, exerts itself in strengthening the firm and increasing its recognition and social prestige. The third generation sometimes lacks dedication to the management of the family business, preferring leisure and non-productive activities.

== The Florio businesses ==
=== Florio winery ===
Founded in Marsala in 1832 by Vincenzo Florio Sr., the Florio winery (Cantine Florio) has been in continuous Marsala wine production since then. Florio became the first Italian producer of Marsala wine. His winery was between the ones of John Woodhouse and Benjamin Ingham (1784–1861), the original British pioneers in the Marsala wine trade. He built splendid cellars in the town's tuff rock in which to produce and conserve the wine. The winery carries the emblem of a lion.

=== Tuna fishing ===
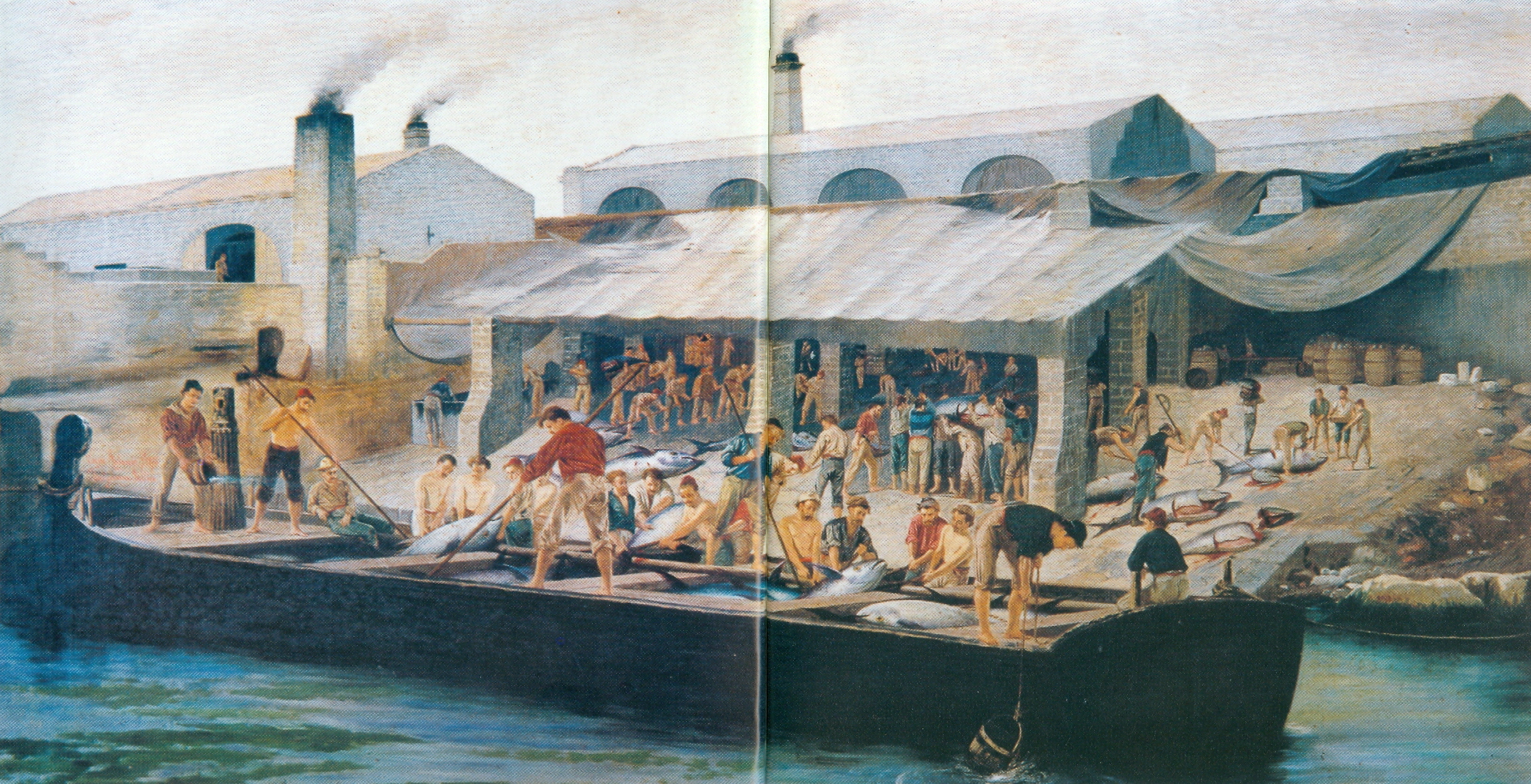
The Tonnara di Favignana (1876), by Antonio Varni

Vincenzo Sr. pioneered in tuna fishing and its canned preparation in Palermo. In 1841, he rented all the tuna fishing grounds, then an important sector of activity in Sicily, at the Aegadian Islands, launching what would become one of the most lucrative business activities of the Florio family. Historians attribute Vincenzo Florio with introducing in Sicily the system of fishing with fixed nets and conservation under oil, thus increasing his trade and financial wealth.

The Tonnara di Favignana was established in 1859 by the Florio family and was in operation until 1977. It was one of the largest tuna fisheries in the Mediterranean. In 1874, Ignazio Florio Sr. purchased the island of Favignana and the whole archipelago of the Aegadian Islands in order to expand the tuna business started by his father.

=== Shipping ===
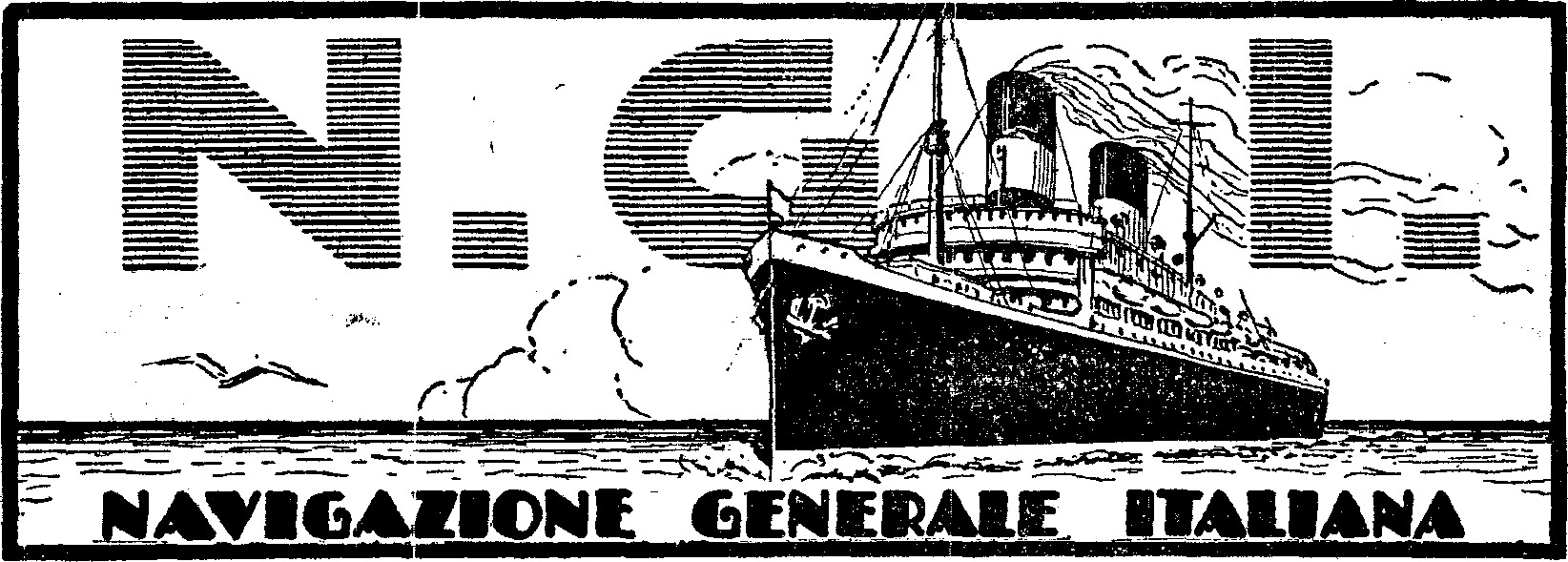
Navigazione Generale Italiana logo (1927)

In October 1861, soon after Sicily was incorporated into the Kingdom of Italy, Vincenzo Florio Sr. founded the Societa in Accomandita Piroscafi Postali-Ignazio & Vicenzo Florio (Florio Line) with a fleet of nine steamers. In 1881, Ignazio Florio Sr. merged with the Rubattino company in Genoa, giving rise to the Navigazione Generale Italiana (NGI), which operated a line on New York City. The company also ran to Mediterranean and Black Sea ports, Canada, India, the Far East and South America. At the time of the merger, the Florio Line was already a major company with a monopoly of the trade in the Mediterranean. The New York Times described the Florios as the "merchant princes of Europe". The Florio Line brought 50 ships into the merger, while Rubattino contributed 40.

The Cantiere navale di Palermo (Palermo Shipyard) in Palermo, Sicily, was founded in 1897 by Ignazio Florio Jr., grandson of Vincenzo Florio. Construction was protracted, and Florio was forced to sell his stake in the shipyard to Attilio Odero (it) in 1905, Florio's partner in NGI, and owner of Cantiere navale di Sestri Ponente and Cantiere della Foce in Genoa, and a partner in Terni steelworks.

=== Newspaper ===
The newspaper L'Ora was founded on the initiative of the Florio family in Palermo. The first issue was published on 22 April 1900. The formal owner was Carlo Di Rudinì, the son of the former prime minister of Italy Antonio Di Rudinì, but the main shareholder and financier was Ignazio Florio Jr. The political direction of the newspaper was generally republican and progressive, representing the Sicilian entrepreneurial middle class.

=== Motor racing ===
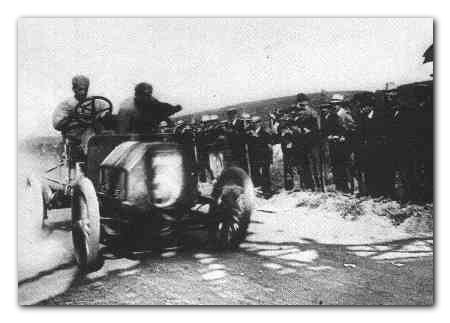
Alessandro Cagno drives Itala No3 to victory at the inaugural 1906 Targa Florio

Vincenzo Florio Jr., an automobile enthusiast, created a real racing team with Felice Nazzaro, and organised races that remained famous. He initiated the financial basis and the engineering plans for the "Brescia Motor Week" in Brescia. He had finished third in the 1904 edition, and generously funded the 1905 race, which was renamed Coppa Florio. He donated 50,000 lire and a cup for the winner.

In 1906, he created the Targa Florio, one of the oldest endurance car races in the world. The first Targa Florio covered 277 miles through multiple hairpin curves on treacherous mountain roads where severe changes in climate frequently occurred and racers even faced bandits and irate shepherds. The race passed through many small villages, and fans lined up along the roads with no protection from the race cars. It was suspended in 1978 because of safety concerns. Today, the race continues with a different circuit as a minor racing event.

== In popular culture ==
In 2019, Stefania Auci wrote a historical novel about the family, The Florios of Sicily (Italian: I leoni di Sicilia), which was a surprise best seller, selling over one million copies and being released in 35 countries. In 2021, she released a sequel, The Triumph of the Lions (Italian: L'inverno dei leoni).

A streaming series adaption of Auci’s novel titled The Lions of Sicily was announced in 2022; produced by Disney+ and directed by Paolo Genovese, it stars Michele Riondino, Miriam Leone, Donatella Finocchiaro and Vinicio Marchioni.

== Sources ==
- Cancila, Orazio (1999). Palermo, Roma/Bari: Laterza (coll. « Storia delle città italiane »), ISBN 978-88-420-5781-9
- Cancila, Orazio (2008). I Florio: storia di una dinastia imprenditoriale, Milan: Bompiano ISBN 978-88-58-70106-5
- Dickie, John (2004). Cosa Nostra. A history of the Sicilian Mafia, London: Coronet ISBN 0-340-82435-2
