= Cantiere navale di Palermo =

Shipyard in Palermo, Sicily

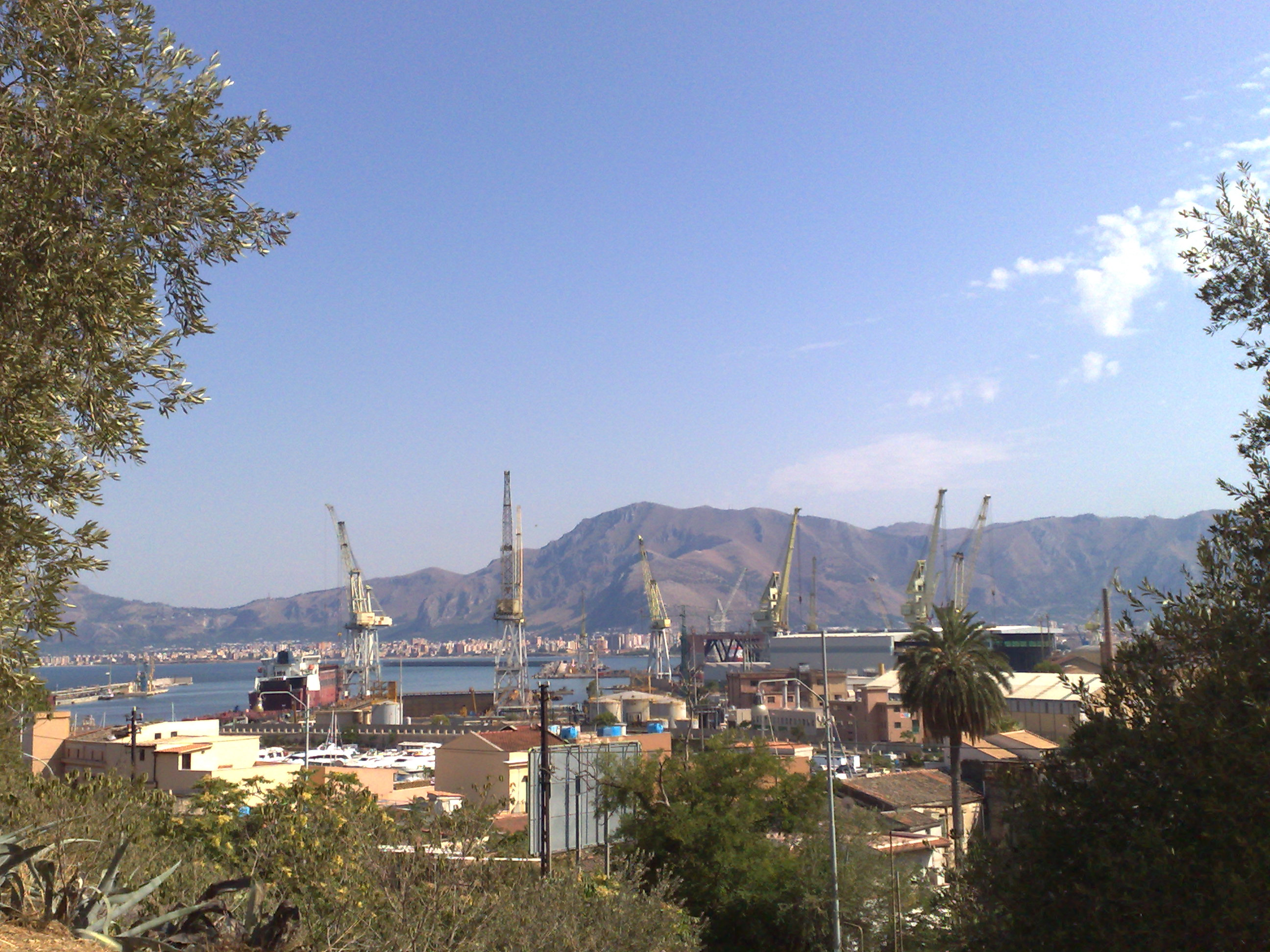
- Industry: Shipbuilding
- Founded: 1897
- Headquarters: Palermo, Sicily
- Parent: Fincantieri

Cantiere navale di Palermo (Palermo Shipyard) is a shipyard in Palermo, Sicily. The premise falls within the Port of Palermo area. The Port Authority agreed a State concession to Fincantieri expiring 2057. The shipyard has two graving docks (respectively by 400,000 dwt and 20,000 dwt) and one new building shipway.

== History ==
In 1893, an agreement was signed between the Italian State and the Municipality of Palermo providing for a major modernisation plan for the city's port, including the construction of a careening dock for the maintenance and repair of large vessels. The project did not go ahead because of the political crisis that paralysed the city of Palermo. In July 1896, work had barely begun and was still at a standstill. In September 1896, Ignazio Florio Jr., scion of the wealthy Florio family, and shipowner and owner of the Navigazione Generale Italiana company, which provided regular services within Sicily and to the ports of Naples and Marseille, presented his own project for the construction of a shipyard with a large careening basin.

Thanks to Florio's excellent relations with the head of government, Antonio di Rudinì, the agreement for the construction of the careening dock and the shipyard was signed on 16 March 1897. The financing of the work was divided between the Florio family (66%), the Italian State, the Municipality of Palermo and the Province of Palermo, as well as a small subsidy from the Cassa di Risparmio of Palermo. Work began on 14 May 1898. The shipyard was inaugurated in 1903, but found itself without orders. The Florio family, which had been forced to go into debt with the Banca Commerciale Italiana, was obliged to sell its shares in the shipyard in 1905 to Attilio Odero (it), Florio's partner in Navigazione Generale Italiana, but also owner of Cantiere navale di Sestri Ponente and Cantiere della Foce in Genoa, and a partner in Terni steelworks.

It was then amalgamated with the two shipyards belonging to Officine e Cantieri Liguri-Anconetani into Cantieri Navali Riuniti (CNR) on 31 January 1906. In 1925 CNR was renamed as Cantieri Navali del Tirreno after it gained control of the Cantiere navale di Riva Trigoso. After completing bankruptcy proceedings in August 1973, it came under the control of Italcantieri and then Fincantieri in 1984.

== Ships built ==
Notable ships built by Palermo Shipyard includes:

- the Soldati-class destroyers of Royal Italian Navy: Bersagliere and Granatiere in 1938
- the Capitani Romani-class cruiser Ulpio Traiano (1939)
- the Ro-Ro ferry MV Avrasya (built as Lazio in 1953)
- the freighter Grande America (1997)
- the offshore supply vessels UOS Challenger (2009), UOS Enterprise, UOS Pathfinder and UOS Navigator (2010)
- the Amphibious transport dock of the Qatari Emiri Navy: Al Fulk (2023)

== Bibliography ==
- Brescia, Maurizio (2012). Mussolini's Navy: A Reference Guide to the Regina Marina 1930–45. Annapolis, Maryland: Naval Institute Press. ISBN 978-1-59114-544-8.
