= Ignazio Florio Sr. =

Italian entrepreneur and politician

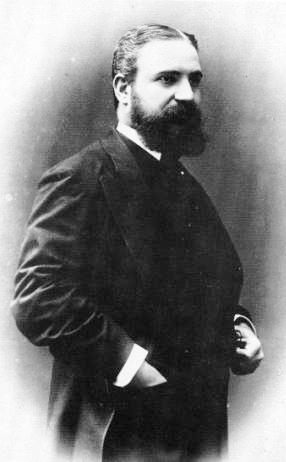
- Ignazio Florio Sr. in 1891.
- Born: 16 December 1838; Palermo, Kingdom of the Two Sicilies
- Died: 17 May 1891 (aged 52); Palermo, Kingdom of Italy
- Occupations: Entrepreneur and politician
- Known for: Member of the Florio family

Ignazio Florio Sr. (Palermo, 16 December 1838 – Palermo, 17 May 1891) was an Italian entrepreneur and politician, member of the rich Florio economic dynasty, one of the wealthiest Italian families during the late 19th century.

== Biography ==
The son of Vincenzo Florio Sr., the founder of the entrepreneurial Florio family dynasty, and of Giulia Portalupi, Ignazio was born in Palermo on 17 December 1838. After the death of his father in 1868, he resolved the problems related to the division of inheritance that could have resulted in the liquidation of the flourishing enterprise.

The other heirs, his sisters Giuseppina and Angelina, were not interested in the family businesses and preferred the payment of their parts. This required cash outflows of over 4 million lire, corresponding to more than a third of the value of all assets. Ignazio succeeded in dealing with the financial effort without affecting the productive activities. Free from constraints, he set about to consolidate and further develop the business empire.

In 1874, Ignazio Florio Sr. purchased the island of Favignana and the whole archipelago of the Aegadian Islands in order to expand the tuna business started by his family. Over time he brought the flotilla of the paternal shipping line Societa in Accomandita Piroscafi Postali-Ignazio & Vicenzo Florio (Florio Line) to a hundred units and in 1881 merged with the Rubattino company in Genoa, giving rise to the Navigazione Generale Italiana. At the time of the merger, the Florio Line was already a major company with a monopoly of the trade in the Mediterranean. The New York Times described the Florios as the "merchant princes of Europe". The Florio Line brought 50 ships into the merger, while Rubattino contributed 40.

He also considerably developed all the other industries founded by his father. In 1883 he was appointed Senator of the Kingdom of Italy, due to the fact that he had paid three thousand lire of direct taxation for three years because of his assets or industry. At his death in 1891 Ignazio Sr. left his two sons, Ignazio Florio Jr. and Vincenzo Florio, with assets valued at around 100 million lire.

A public Monument to Ignazio Florio was erected in 1909 in the centre of Piazza Florio of Palermo.

== Issue ==
Ignazio Sr. and his wife, Baroness Giovanna D'Ondes Trigona, had three children:

- Ignazio Jr. (1869–1957)
- Giulia (1870–1947)
- Vincenzo (1883–1959)
