= Mattanza =

Traditional bluefin tuna fishing method in Sicily and Sardinia

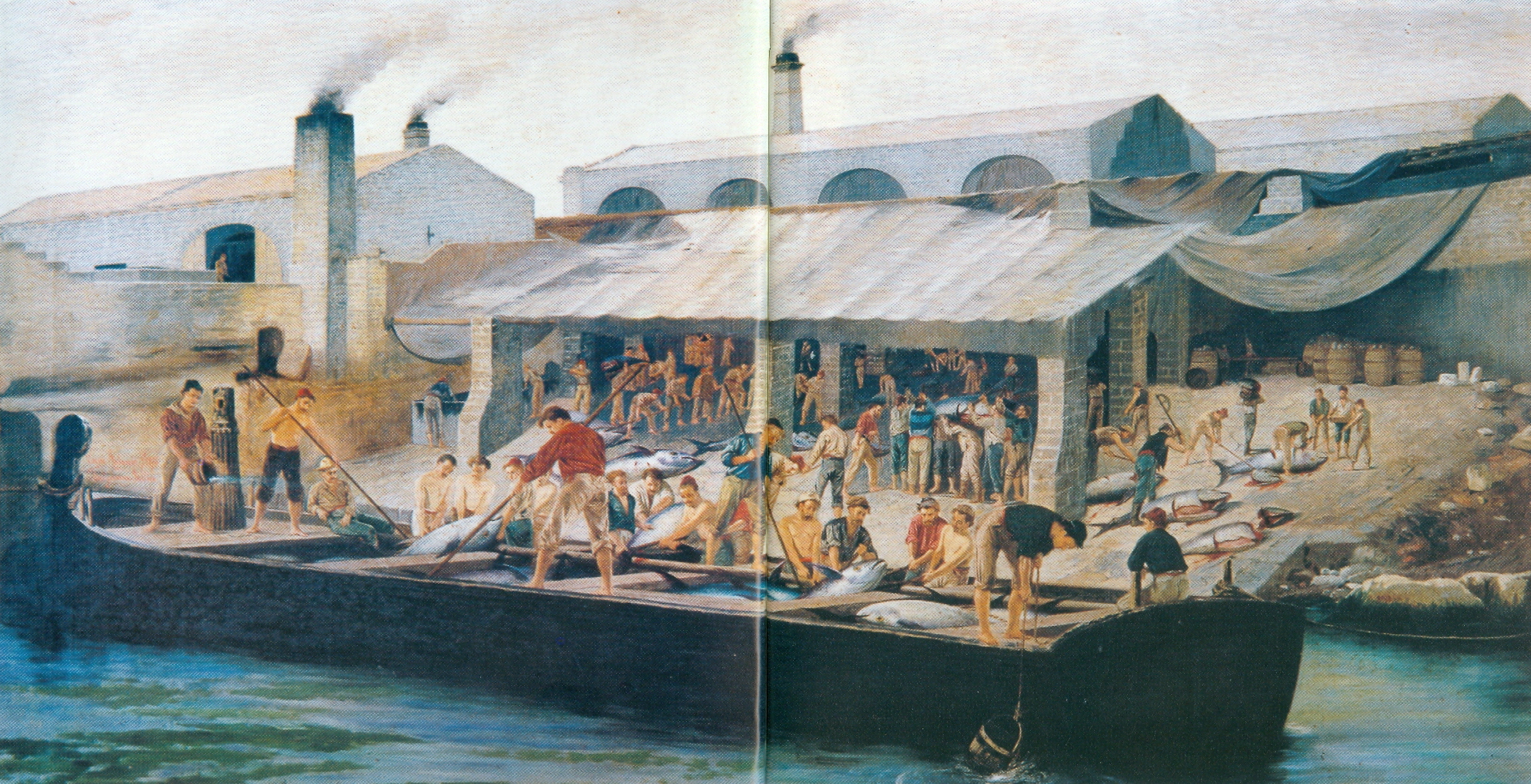
Tonnara off the coast of Favignana, Sicily, a painting by Antonio Varni

Mattanza, literally 'slaughter' or 'killing' in Italian, also known as almadraba in Spanish and almadrava in Portuguese, is a traditional tuna fishing technique that uses a series of large nets to trap and exhaust the fish.

There are mattanza traditions linked to Trapani in Sicily, the Egadi island of Favignana, and Carloforte and the Isola di San Pietro in southwestern Sardinia, as well as locations in Spain, Portugal, Morocco, and Tunisia.

== History ==
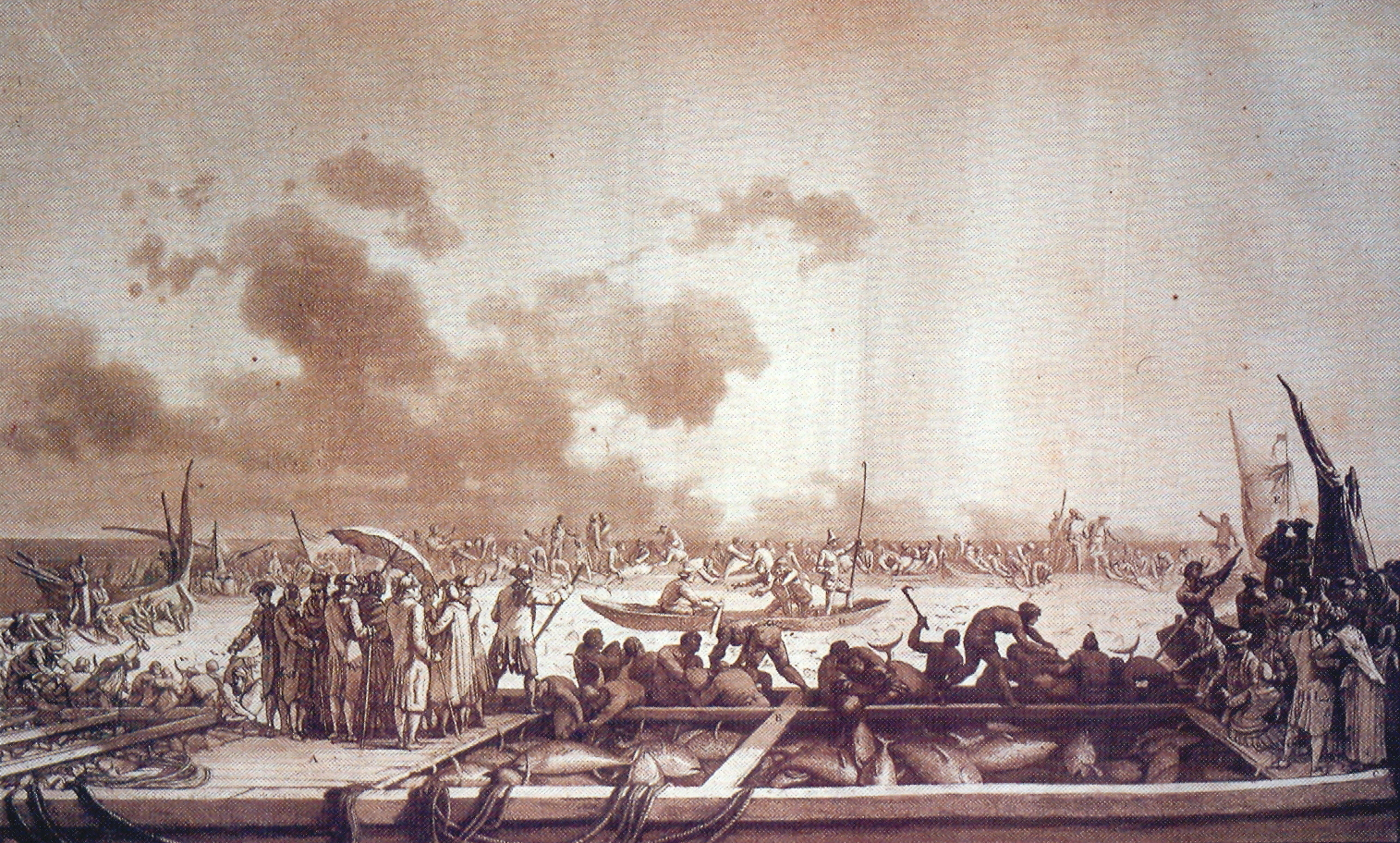
Mattanza in Sicily, an etching La pêche du thon ("Tuna Fishing", 1782) by Jean-Pierre Houël

The practice of mattanza is an elaborate and age-old fishing technique for trapping and catching Atlantic bluefin tuna that can be traced back to the Phoenicians.

While it is unclear how the technique was spread around the Mediterranean basin, it was also imparted to areas such as Iberia during Iberia's Islamic period.

The Spanish derive the term almadraba (Portuguese: almadrava) from the Andalusi Arabic word al-maḍraba (المضربة), meaning 'a place to strike' (Arabic root: ḍaraba (ضرب), meaning 'it struck, hit'). The introduction in Sicily and Sardinia, but not mainland Italy, is also either attributed to the Moors, during Sicily's own Islamic period or by the Spanish afterwards.

== Traditional mattanza ==
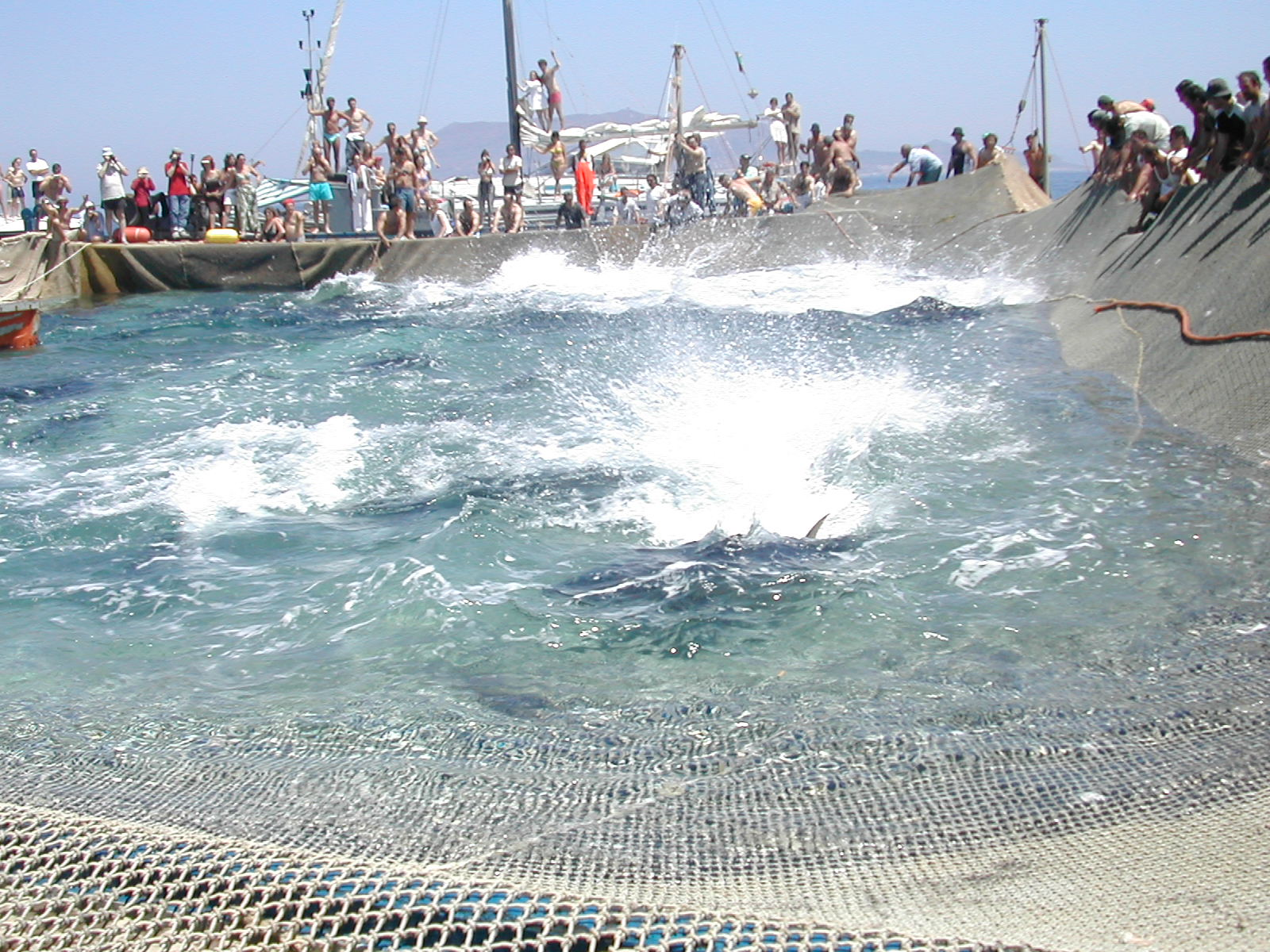
Mattanza in Favignana, Sicily

From March the tuna schools migrate through the Strait of Gibraltar into the Mediterranean to visit their spawning grounds.

From May onwards, fishermen drive schools of fish in straits into a system of nets (known in Italian as tonnara), that form various chambers. The tuna are guided through the chambers, which are being drawn closer and closer together, to the inner chamber (southern Italian: càmira dâ morti, literally "death chamber"), from which they are then lifted onto the fishing boats with grappling hooks. The tuna caught is processed on land directly in the tonnara (from tonno, meaning "tuna").

Traditional Italian locations for the mattanza include Trapani, Favignana, Capo Passero, Formica, Bonagia, Scopello, Castellammare del Golfo, San Vito Lo Capo, Portopalo and Capo Granitola and in the Sardinian locals of Sant'Antioco and Carloforte. There are other locations in Andalusia, Murcia and Valencia in Spain, Algarve in Portugal, Sidi Daoud in Tunisia and in Morocco.

== Falling fish stocks and decline ==
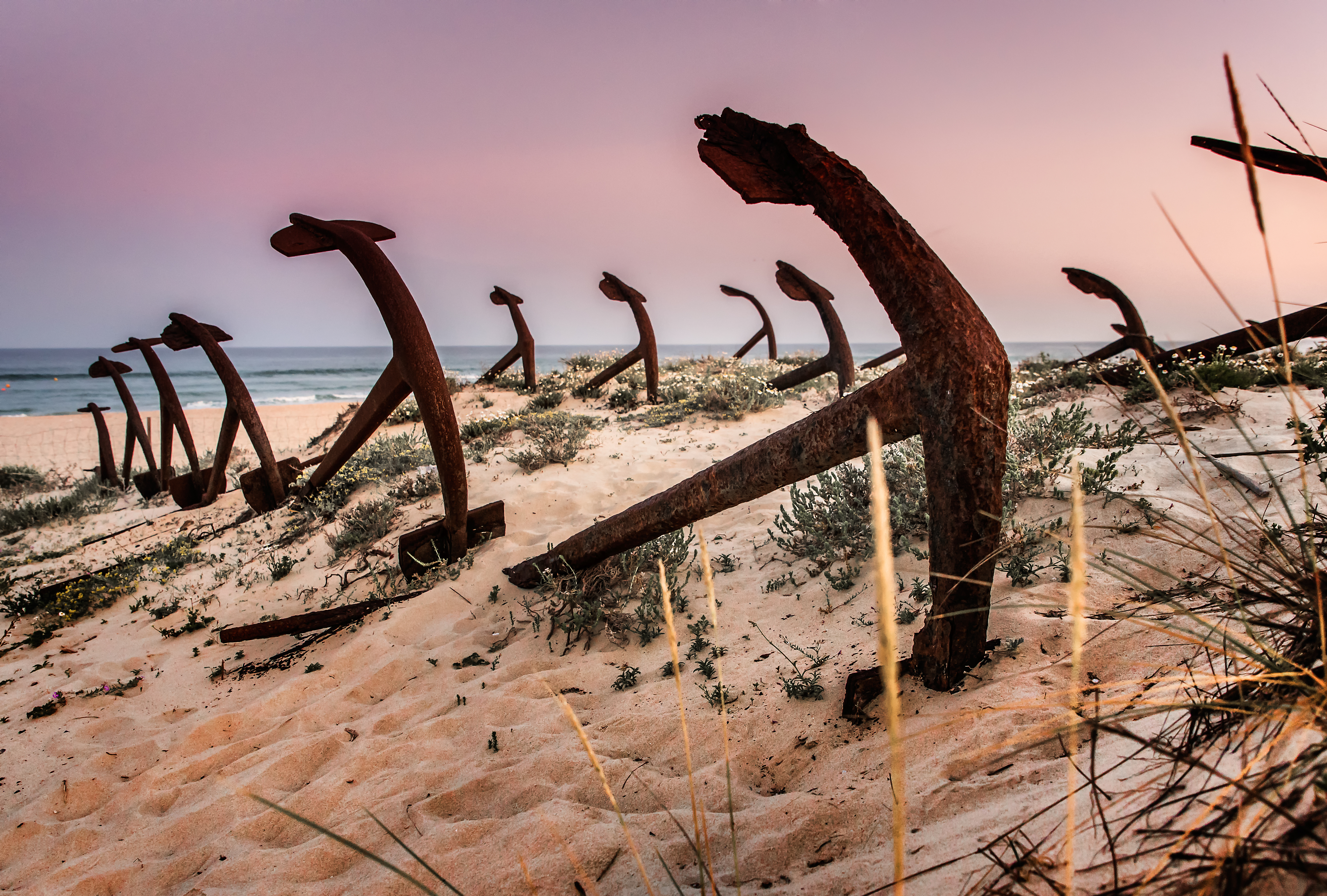
Abandoned anchors on Tavira Island, Portugal as a result of the decline of the Almadrava tradition

The bycatch contains, among others, bullet tuna (Auxis rochei), little tunny (Euthynnus alletteratus), Atlantic bonito (Sarda sarda), bigeye tuna (Thunnus obesus) and swordfish (Xiphias gladius). However, the Atlantic bluefin tuna yields of the mattanza are constantly falling due to the overfishing of the stocks, so that the mattanza is more of a tourist event today.

In Italy, in 2003 and 2004, it could no longer take place in Trapani. The schools of tuna had already been fully fished beforehand by international fishing fleets long before they approach coastal areas were they can be caught with the mattanza traps. The last slaughter in Sicily took place in the Favignana trap in 2007. In 2015, only one slaughter took place in Sardinia, between Portoscuso and Carloforte. The Ministry of Agricultural, Food and Forestry Policies still authorizes six fixed traps in Italy every year: Flat island and Cala Vinagra (Carloforte), Capo Altano and Porto Paglia (Portoscuso), Favignana, Camogli.

== In film ==
- Roberto Rossellini's Stromboli includes documentary shots of the mattanza
- L'Ultima Tonnaro-Mattanza? (The Last Tuna Catch/Massacre?), a film by Philip Singer
