= Antonio Varni =

Italian painter (1841–1908)

Antonio Varni (1841 – 1908) was an Italian painter, painting vedute, historical, and genre pieces.

== Biography ==
He was born in Genoa. Son of a painter, he enrolled in 1853 at the Accademia Ligustica of Fine Arts in Genoa, where he gained various prizes. In 1862, he was awarded the Marcello Durazzo scholarship, which had been first awarded to Grana; this allowed him to study in Florence for five years. In Florence, he worked under Antonio Ciseri and Enrico Pollastrini. He was influenced by the realistic style of landscape of the Macchiaioli. He died in 1908 in Sampierdarena.

Among his many works: an oil on canvas of Una passeggiata; Petrarch induces the painter Lippo Memmi to secretly paint a portrait of Laura; Sappho meditates Suicide; Don Abbondio and the cardinal Borromeo, an episode from The Betrothed; Victim of Primogeniture, also called Victim of the Cloister because it depicts a young nun in her death bed, dying due to the cloistered life imposed by her family; The sack and massacre of Muslims in a house in Bulgaria; and The island of Favignana.

He painted Un novelliere fiorentino, and genre paintings, acquired by the Ottoman consul resident in Genoa; four paintings representing scenes from the novel The Betrothed by Manzoni, including: Don Abbondio che accompagna l'Innominato; Padre Cristoforo in casa di Agnese; Lucia in the convent of Monza; Renzo e l'Azzeccagarbugli. These paintings he completed by commission for the banker D. Parodi di Genoa.

His painting of Bordello won a prize established by Prince Oddone in Genoa. He painted the Death of Anita Garibaldi. At the Mostra Milanese, he displayed the genre paintings: Politica in convento; L'organetto del villaggio; In tempo... triste pagina del secolo XIX; Per amore; Chiostro; and Un bel mattino a Pegli.
