= Franca Florio =

Italian noblewoman

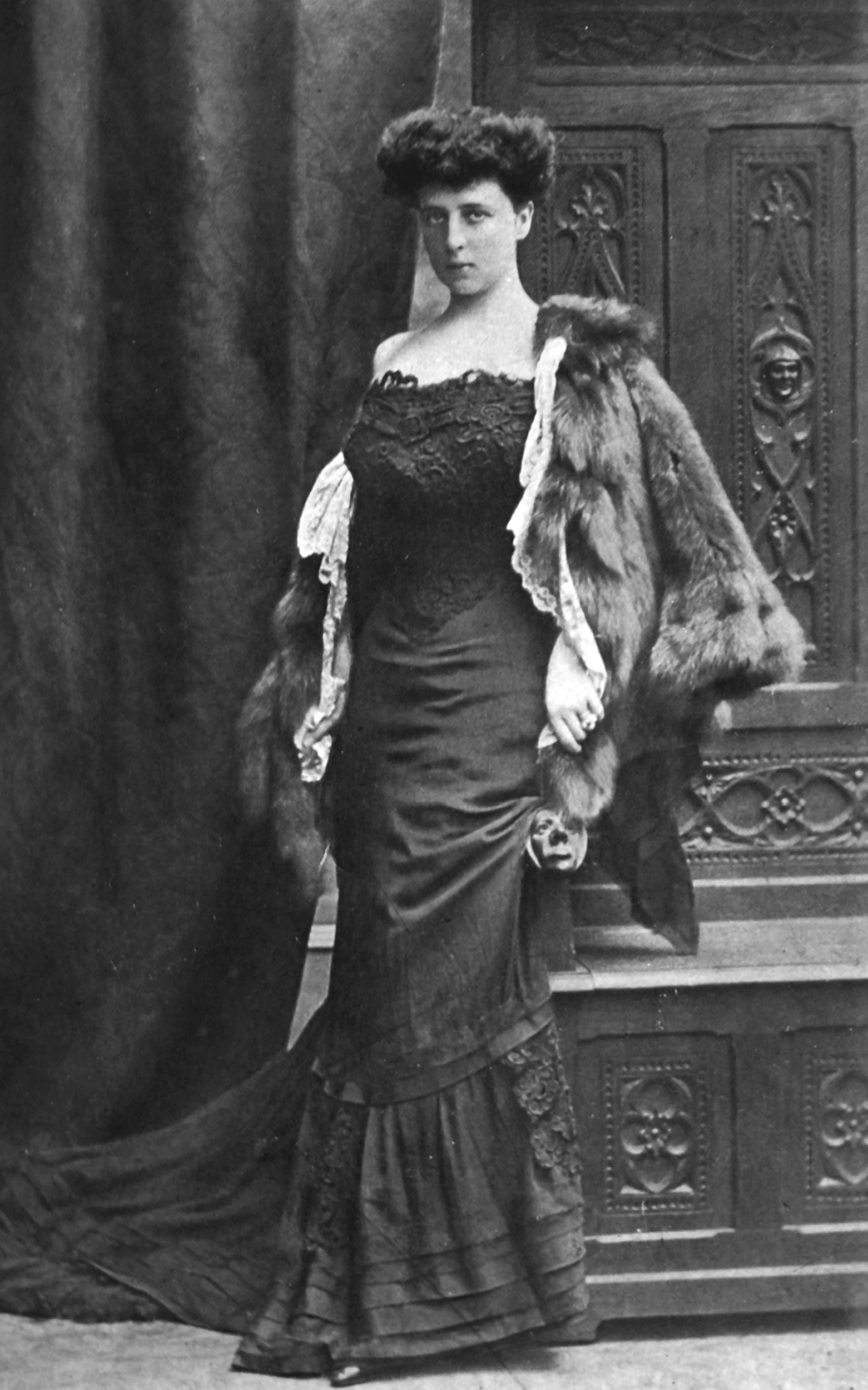
- Franca Florio in 1908.
- Born: 27 December 1873; Palermo, Kingdom of Italy
- Died: 10 November 1950 (aged 76); Migliarino Pisano, Italy
- Occupations: Noblewoman, socialite
- Known for: Prominent member of the Florio family; Belle Époque protagonist

Franca Florio (Palermo, 27 December 1873 – Migliarino Pisano, 10 November 1950), born Francesca Paola Jacona della Motta dei baroni di San Giuliano and commonly called Donna Franca, was an Italian noblewoman, socialite and a prominent protagonist of the Belle Époque. Descendant of a Sicilian noble family, she married the entrepreneur Ignazio Florio Jr., member of the wealthy Florio family. She was nicknamed "Queen of Palermo".

== Biography ==
=== Ancestry and marriage ===
Francesca Paola Jacona della Motta was born in Palermo on 27 December 1873. She belonged to an impoverished family of the Sicilian high aristocracy. Her father was Pietro Jacona della Motta, baron of San Giuliano, and her mother was Costanza Notarbartolo di Villarosa, sister of Pietro Notarbartolo, duke of Villarosa. Her maternal ancestry also included the House of Montcada and the Lucchesi-Palli it, princes of Campofranco.

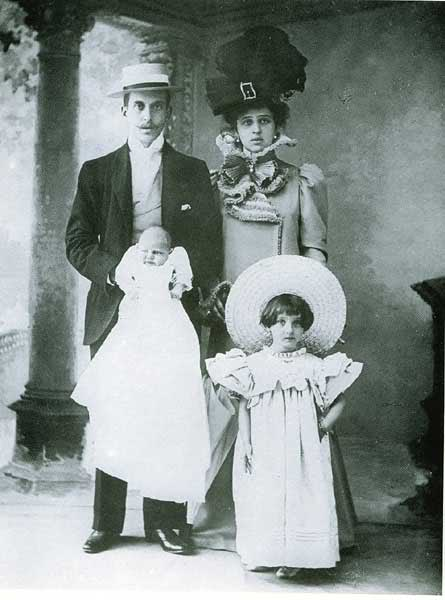
Ignazio Florio Jr., Donna Franca and their first children, Giovanna (1893-1902) and Ignazio "baby boy" (1898-1903).

Despite the impoverishment of the family, the prestigious ancestry of Donna Franca made her a good catch, especially in the eyes of the Sicilian high bourgeoisie looking for nobility. Therefore, on 11 February 1893, at the age of 19, Franca married the entrepreneur and shipowner Ignazio Florio Jr., heir of the Florio family's economic empire. The assets of Ignazio Florio Jr. included the Florio winery (leading company in the production of Marsala wine), the whole Aegadian Islands archipelagos with a large tuna catching and processing plant, the Fonderia Oretea, the Banco Florio (Sicily's correspondent bank of the Rothschilds ), and most importantly 40% of the Navigazione Generale Italiana.

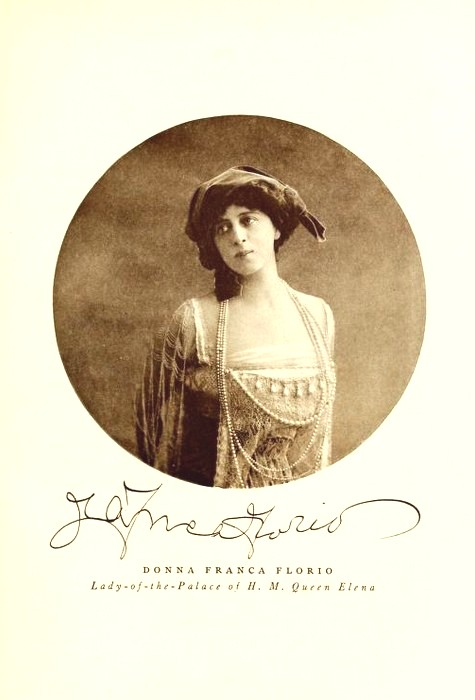
Donna Franca in 1911.

=== Belle Époque and social life ===
After her marriage to Ignazio Florio Jr., Donna Franca became a prominent figure of the European social life. In the early 20th century, thanks to the influence of the Florio family, Sicily (especially Palermo and the town of Taormina) was an important meeting place for the European wealthiest elite. With her yachts called Sultana and Aegusa, Donna Franca was able to attend the social life not only in Sicily, but even in the Côte d'Azur. Other places frequented by Donna Franca were Berlin, Paris, London, etc. In 1902 she became lady-in-waiting of the Queen consort of Italy Elena of Montenegro.

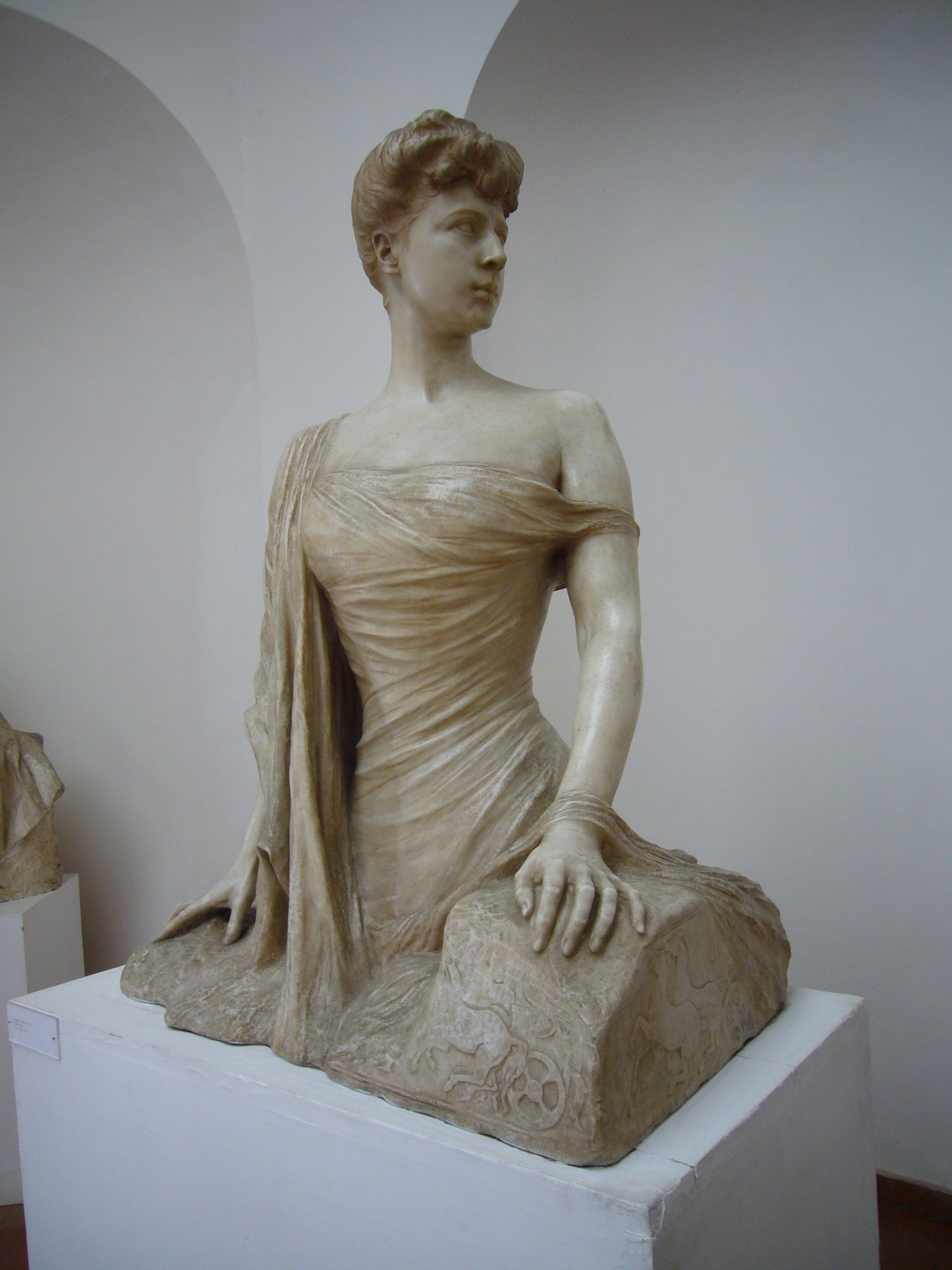
Pietro Canonica, sculpture of Franca Florio. Villa Borghese, Rome.

Donna Franca was also an art patron. She was a friend of the Italian writer and poet Gabriele D'Annunzio, leading figure of the Decadent movement in Italy, who described her as "a unique woman. A creature whose every movement possesses a divine rhythm". In 1901 Donna Franca met the painter Giovanni Boldini, an internationally renowned portraitist who used to work especially in Paris and London. Therefore, Boldini painted the famous "Portrait of Franca Florio". Other artists connected to her were the dialect poet Trilussa, the composers Pietro Mascagni and Ruggero Leoncavallo, the painter Ettore De Maria Bergler, the sculptor Pietro Canonica, the novelist Matilde Serao and the writer Robert de Montesquiou.

In the same years, Franca Florio also met the German Emperor Wilhelm II, who became one of her most prestigious admirers. He nicknamed Donna Franca with the appellation of "Star of Italy" due to her beauty. Subsequently, the Emperor and his wife, Augusta Victoria, went various times to Palermo. In her palace in Palermo Donna Franca also welcomed the British King Edward VII and his wife, Alexandra of Denmark, the Russian Empress Alexandra Feodorovna, the Archduke Franz Ferdinand of Austria, and celebrities such as Oscar Wilde, Greta Garbo, Grace Kelly and Maria Callas.

=== Last years and death ===
After the bankruptcy of Ignazio Florio Jr., Donna Franca retreated to the Villa Silviati, belonging to the husband of her daughter, Costanza Igiea Florio, in the frazione of Migliarino Pisano, in the town of Vecchiano (Pisa). She died on 10 November 1950 and was buried in the Cemetery of Santa Maria di Gesù, Palermo.

== Cultural depictions ==
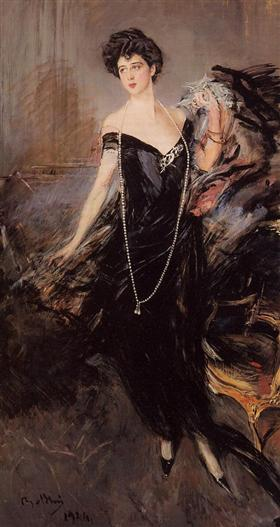
Giovanni Boldini, Portrait of Franca Florio

The famous Giovanni Boldini's Portrait of Donna Franca Florio was commissioned by Ignazio Florio. Boldini's initial, beautifully provocative version, painted in 1901, was not approved of by Ignazio Florio. He reportedly found it risqué and "unnatural and unreal" looking and demanded that Boldini lengthen the dress and add full sleeves with wide black lace. Once Boldini had reworked the work to oblige his commissioner's discontent, it was exhibited at the 1903 Venice Biennial. The portrait remained like this until 1924 when, with the demise of the Florio family's wealth, Baron Maurice de Rothschild acquired it.

Rothschild engaged Boldini to restore it to its original sensual version. This story has, however, come under scrutiny, as the dress Donna Florio wears is more contemporary to the fashion of the 1910's than 1901. Recent X-ray analysis has discovered that there is another layer of paint beneath the central and lower area of the current version of the portrait, raising the strong possibility that it was the long-sleeved, foot-length dress that was depicted in the original version of the painting. After two auctions (Christie's 1995 and Sotheby's 2005), the painting has been on display at the Grand Hotel Villa Igiea in Palermo since 2006. In 2017 it gone to auction again. It is said that the necklace in the painting, with 365 pearls, one for each day of the year, was a present from the husband, begging forgiveness for his many affairs.

Franca Florio, regina di Palermo is the title of a full-length narrative ballet in two acts, with music by Lorenzo Ferrero and scenario, choreography and staging by Luciano Cannito. A commission by the Teatro Massimo in Palermo, the work premiered there on 22 November 2007 with Carla Fracci in the title role, and was restaged in June 2010.

== Issue ==
Donna Franca and her husband Ignazio Florio had five children:

- Giovanna (1893-1902)
- Ignazio (1898-1903)
- Giacobina (stillborn)
- Costanza Igiea (1900-1974)
- Giulia (1909-1989)

== See also ==
- Florio
- Franca Florio, regina di Palermo
