= Franco Florio (footballer) =

Italian former footballer (born 1976)

Personal information
- Date of birth: 18 April 1976 (age 50)
- Place of birth: Cosenza, Italy
- Height: 1.78 m (5 ft 10 in)
- Position: Midfielder

Senior career*
Years	Team	Apps	(Gls)
1993–1995	Cosenza	26	(0)
1995–1996	Roma	0	(0)
1996–1998	Cosenza	29	(3)
1997–1998	→ Foggia (loan)	5	(0)
1999–2002	Monza	63	(2)
2002–2003	Treviso	9	(0)
2007–2011	Rende	60	(9)

Managerial career
- 2021: Crotone (assistant)
- * Club domestic league appearances and goals

Franco Florio (born 18 April 1976) is an Italian former footballer who played as a midfielder.
