= Favignana =

- Comune
- Comune di Favignana
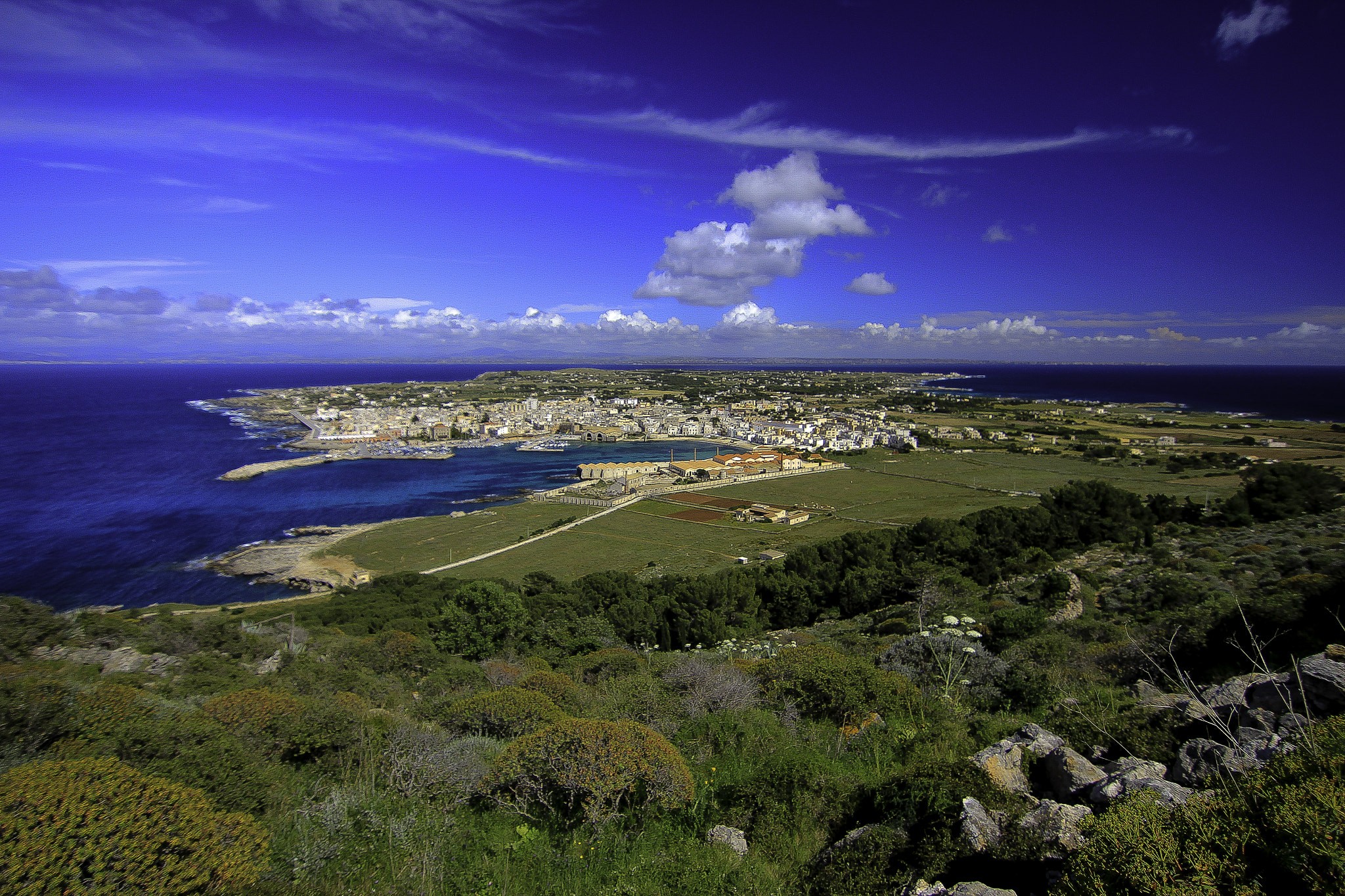
- View of the town of Favignana from the Castle of Santa Caterina

- Coat of arms

- Location within Italy Location within Sicily
- Coordinates: 37°56′N 12°20′E
- Country: Italy
- Region: Sicily
- Province: Trapani (TP)
- Frazioni: Levanzo, Marettimo

Government
  - Mayor: Giuseppe Pagoto (PD)

Area
  - Total: 38.32 km^{2} (14.80 sq mi)
- Elevation: 6 m (20 ft)

Population (2026)
  - Total: 4,540
  - Density: 118/km^{2} (307/sq mi)
- Demonym: Favignanesi
- Time zone: UTC+1 (CET)
  - Summer (DST): UTC+2 (CEST)
- Postal code: 91023
- Dialing code: 0923
- Website: Official website

Favignana (Sicilian: Faugnana) is a comune (municipality) including three islands (Favignana, Marettimo and Levanzo) of the Aegadian Islands in the Province of Trapani in the autonomous island region of Sicily in southern Italy. It has 4,540 inhabitants.

It is situated approximately 18 kilometres (11 miles) west of the coast of Sicily, between Trapani and Marsala, the coastal area where the Stagnone Lagoon and the international airport of Trapani, are sited.

== History ==
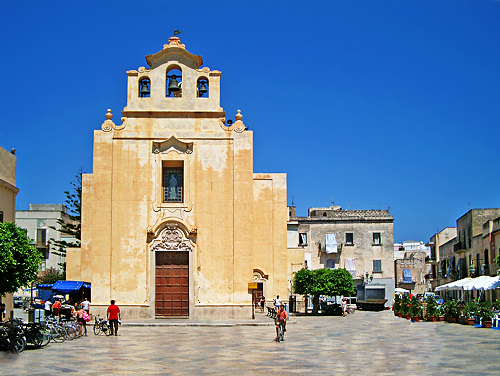
Church of the Immaculate Conception, dated back to 18th century.

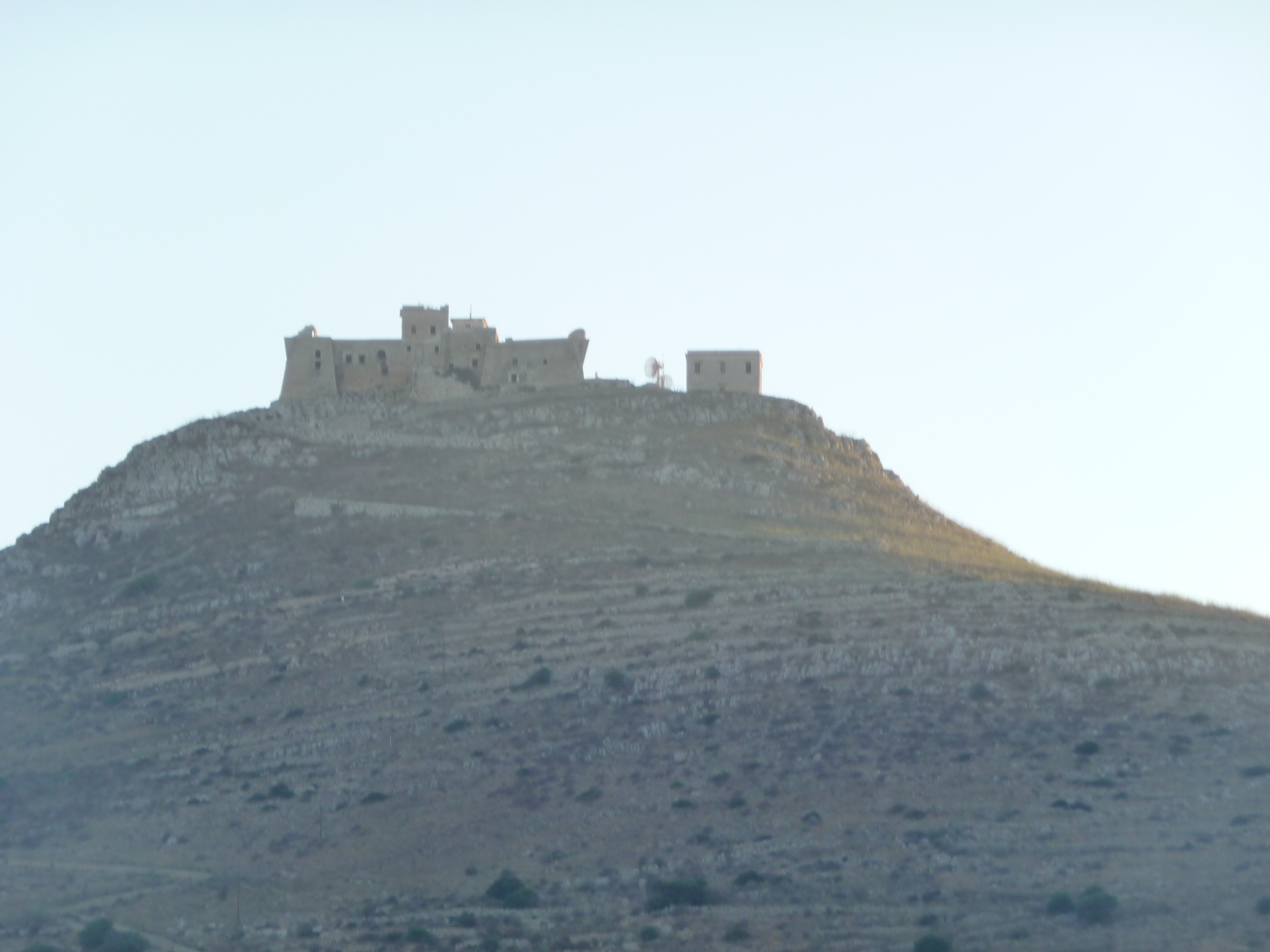
Santa Caterina Castle

In ancient times, Favignana was called Aegusa, meaning "goat island" in Greek (Αιγούσα). The present name is derived from Favonio, an Italian name for the foehn wind. The Phoenicians established an outpost on the island as a stopping point on their trans-Mediterranean trading routes until the defeat of the Carthaginian army during the First Punic War.

On 10 March 241 BC, a major naval battle was fought a short distance offshore between the two powers. Two hundred Roman ships under the consul Gaius Lutatius Catulus met and decisively defeated a much larger Carthaginian fleet of 400 ships, with the Romans sinking 120 Carthaginian vessels and taking 10,000 prisoners. So many dead Phoenicians washed ashore on the northeastern part of Favignana that the shoreline there acquired the name "Red Cove" (Cala Rossa) from the bloodshed. The Romans took possession of the island under the terms of the treaty that ended the war.

In the early Middle Ages, Favignana was captured by Arabs and was used as a base for the Islamic conquest of Sicily. The Saracens constructed a castle on top of the tallest hill called Santa Caterina. Soon after, the Normans took possession of the island, and built fortifications there in 1081.

Under the Aragonese rulers of Sicily, Favignana and the other Aegadian Islands were hired out to Genoese merchants and in the 15th century the islands were granted to one Giovanni de Karissima, who adopted the grand title "Baron of Tuna".

The plentiful tuna fish found offshore were first exploited systematically under the Spanish from about the 17th century onwards. Facing severe financial problems from their ongoing wars, the Spanish sold the islands to the Marquis Pallavicino of Genoa in 1637. The Pallavicini substantially developed the economy of the island, prompting the establishment of the modern town of Favignana around the Castello San Giacomo. In 1874, the Pallavicino family sold the Aegadian Islands to Ignazio Florio, the son of a wealthy mainland industrialist, for two million liras. He invested heavily in Favignana and built a major tuna cannery on the island, bringing prosperity to many of the inhabitants. Calcarenite quarries were also opened with stone being exported to Tunisia and Libya.

During the 20th century, Favignana's economy slumped between the two World Wars and many inhabitants emigrated to the mainland and abroad. The fishery declined with the rise of factory fishing after World War II. Thanks to the Parodi brothers, who bought the factory—after the troubles of the Florio family—tuna fishing continued through the 1980s. The factory is now a museum due to the unavoidable decline.

The island's fortunes were turned around by the advent of tourism from the late 1960s onwards.

During World War II, American Forces under Gen. Patton drove the Axis forces from Sicily. Two American officers, Lt. Louis Testa and Capt. R.E. Gerard, were a two-man 'expedition' which 'captured' the three Aegadian Islands and 1027 prisoners. The officers went over from a Sicilian fishing boat, which they paid $3. They went ashore on Favignana Island and the Italian Lt. Colonel surrendered it along with Levanzo and Marittimo islands and their garrisons.

== Geography ==
Favignana is the largest of the three principal Egadi Islands, with a land area of 19.8 square kilometres (7.6 sq mi). The island is often described as having a "butterfly" shape. Favignana town is located on a narrow isthmus connecting the two "wings", which have quite different characteristics. The eastern half of the island is largely flat, while the western half is dominated by a chain of hills of which Monte Santa Caterina is the tallest at 314 metres (1,030 feet). It is topped by a fort, originally established by the Saracens. It was used by the Italian military and closed to the public. It has now been abandoned. A number of small islands are situated off the south coast of Favignana.

== Island ==
The island of Favignana is famous for its tuna fisheries and is now a popular tourist destination with frequent hydrofoil connections to the mainland.

== Demographics ==
Historical population
Year	Pop.	±%
1861	3,913	—
1871	5,502	+40.6%
1881	5,763	+4.7%
1901	6,377	+10.7%
1911	5,972	−6.4%
1921	6,116	+2.4%
1931	5,740	−6.1%
1936	6,196	+7.9%
1951	6,714	+8.4%
1961	6,133	−8.7%
1971	4,717	−23.1%
1981	4,498	−4.6%
1991	4,335	−3.6%
2001	4,137	−4.6%
2011	4,185	+1.2%
2021	4,468	+6.8%
Source: ISTAT

As of 2026, the population is 4,540, of which 51.3% are male, and 48.7% are female. Minors make up 12.9% of the population, and seniors make up 27.0%.

=== Immigration ===
As of 2025, immigrants make up 4.1% of the population. The 5 largest foreign countries of birth are Romania, Germany, Tunisia, Bangladesh, and Libya.

== Administration ==
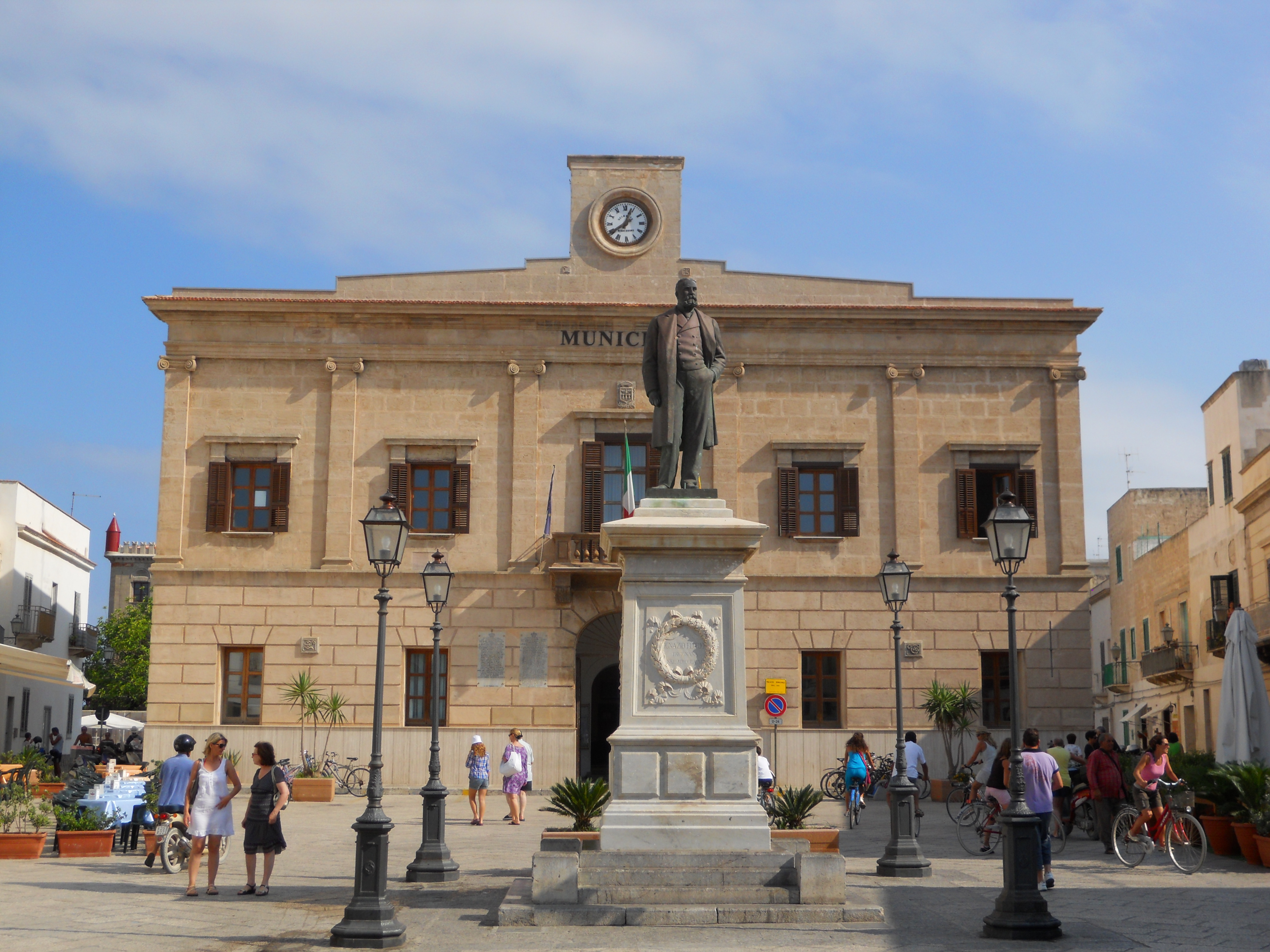
Favignana Town Hall.

Favignana is headed by a mayor (sindaco) assisted by a legislative body, the consiglio comunale, and an executive body, the giunta comunale. Since 1994 the mayor and members of the consiglio comunale are directly elected together by resident citizens, while from 1946 to 1994 the mayor was chosen by the legislative body. The giunta comunale is chaired by the mayor, who appoints others members, called assessori. The offices of the comune are housed in a building usually called the municipio or palazzo comunale.

Since 1994, the mayor of Favignana is directly elected by citizens, originally every four, then every five years.

Mayor	Term start	Term end	Party
Giuseppe D'Asta	14 June 1994	25 May 1998	PPI
Giuseppe Ortisi	25 May 1998	27 May 2003	DS
Gaspare Ernandez	27 May 2003	20 March 2008	FI
Special Prefectural Commissioner (20 March 2008 – 17 June 2008)
Lucio Antinoro	17 June 2008	11 June 2013	PD
Giuseppe Pagoto	11 June 2013	20 June 2020	PD
Special Prefectural Commissioner (20 June 2020 – 6 October 2020)
Francesco Forgione	6 October 2020	14 February 2025	SI
Special Prefectural Commissioner (since 14 February 2025)
Giuseppe Pagoto	26 May 2025	Incumbent	PD

== Main sights ==
The island is famous for its caves of calcarenite rock (locally known as "tufo") and the ancient fishing technique of tonnara, with the trapping and mattanza (slaughter) of bluefin tuna. It hosts the historical Tonnara di Favignana.

As the island consists mainly of calcareous rocks, there are few beaches on the island; however, it is a popular site for scuba diving, snorkeling, and for day trips from nearby Trapani.

== Gallery ==
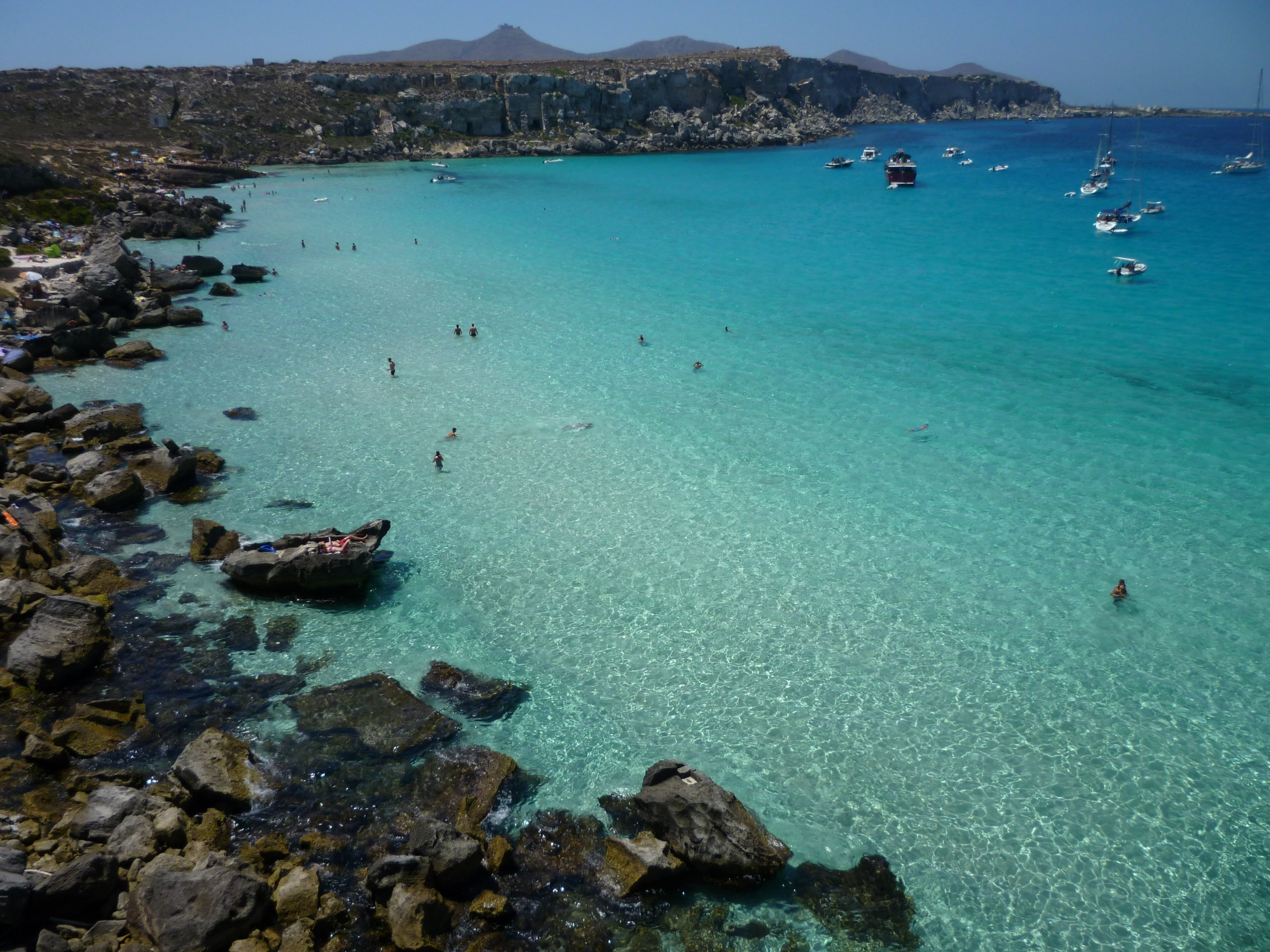
Shore in Favignana

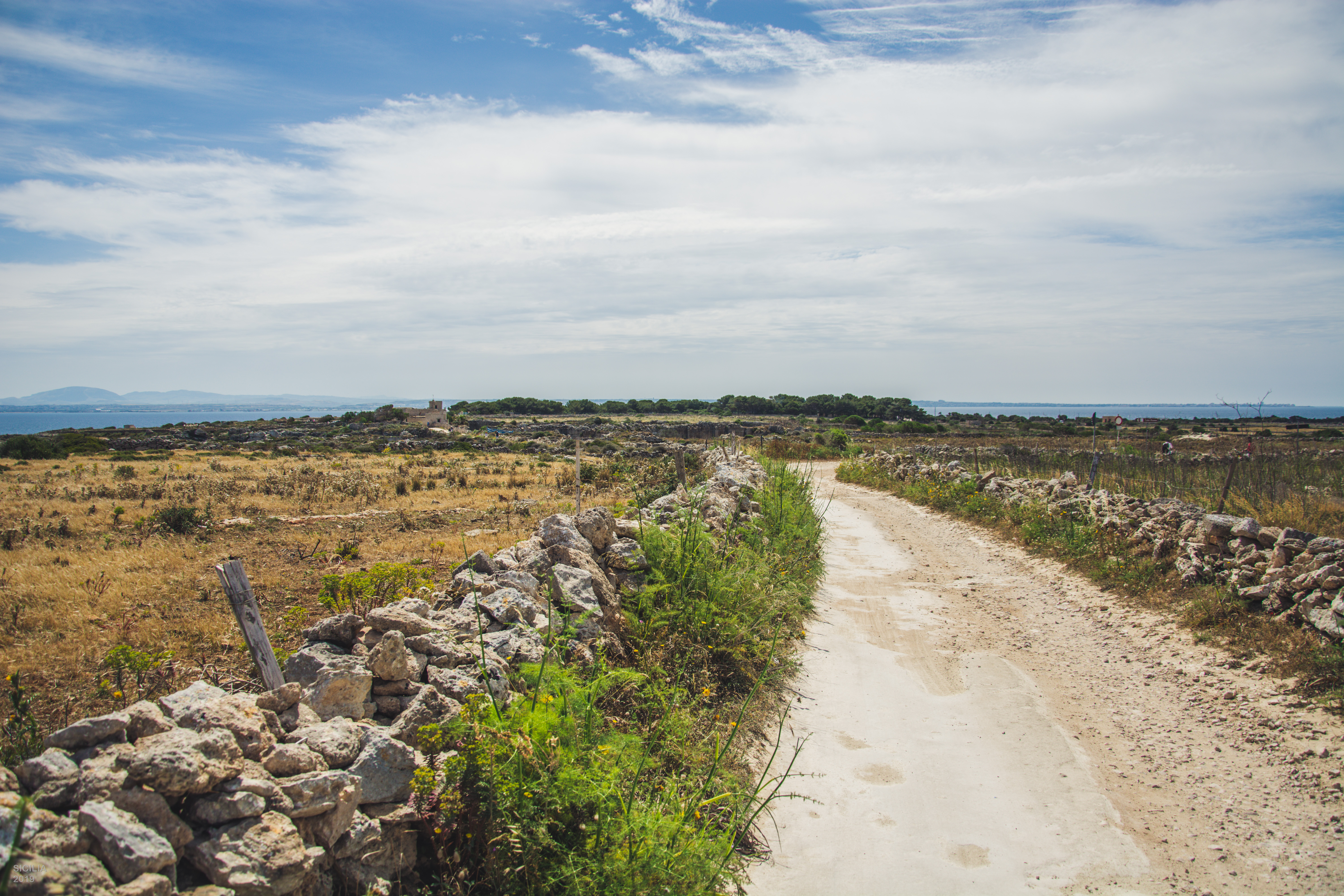
Favignana inland

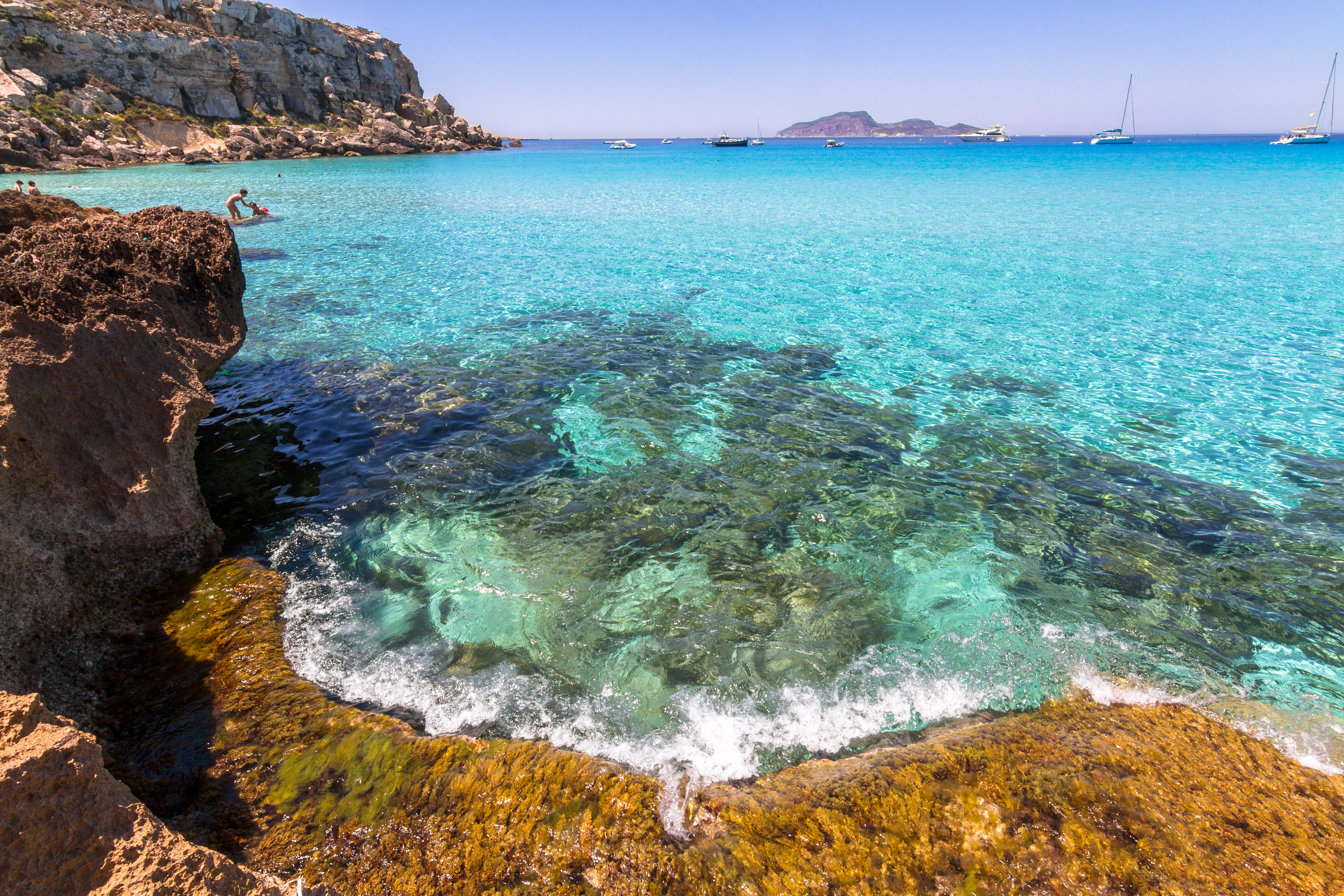
Cala Azzurra
(Light-blue cove)

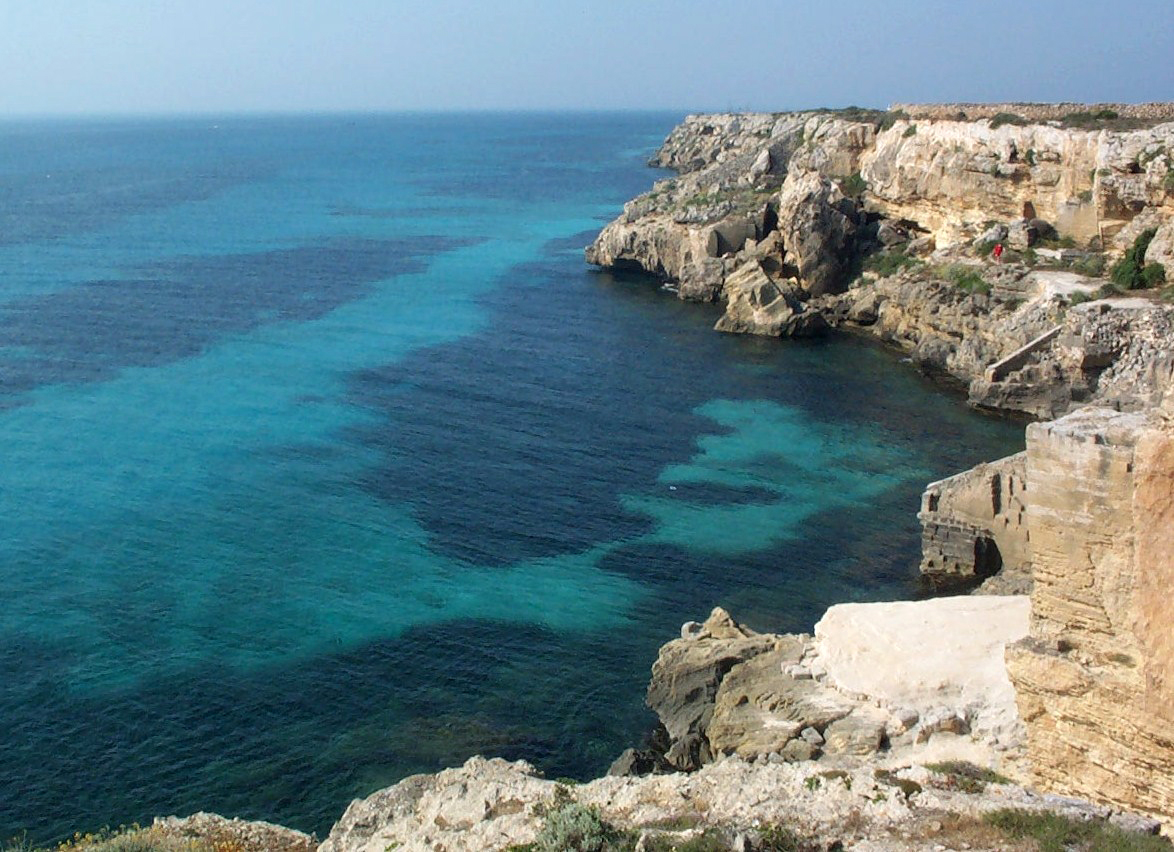
Cala Rossa
(Red cove)

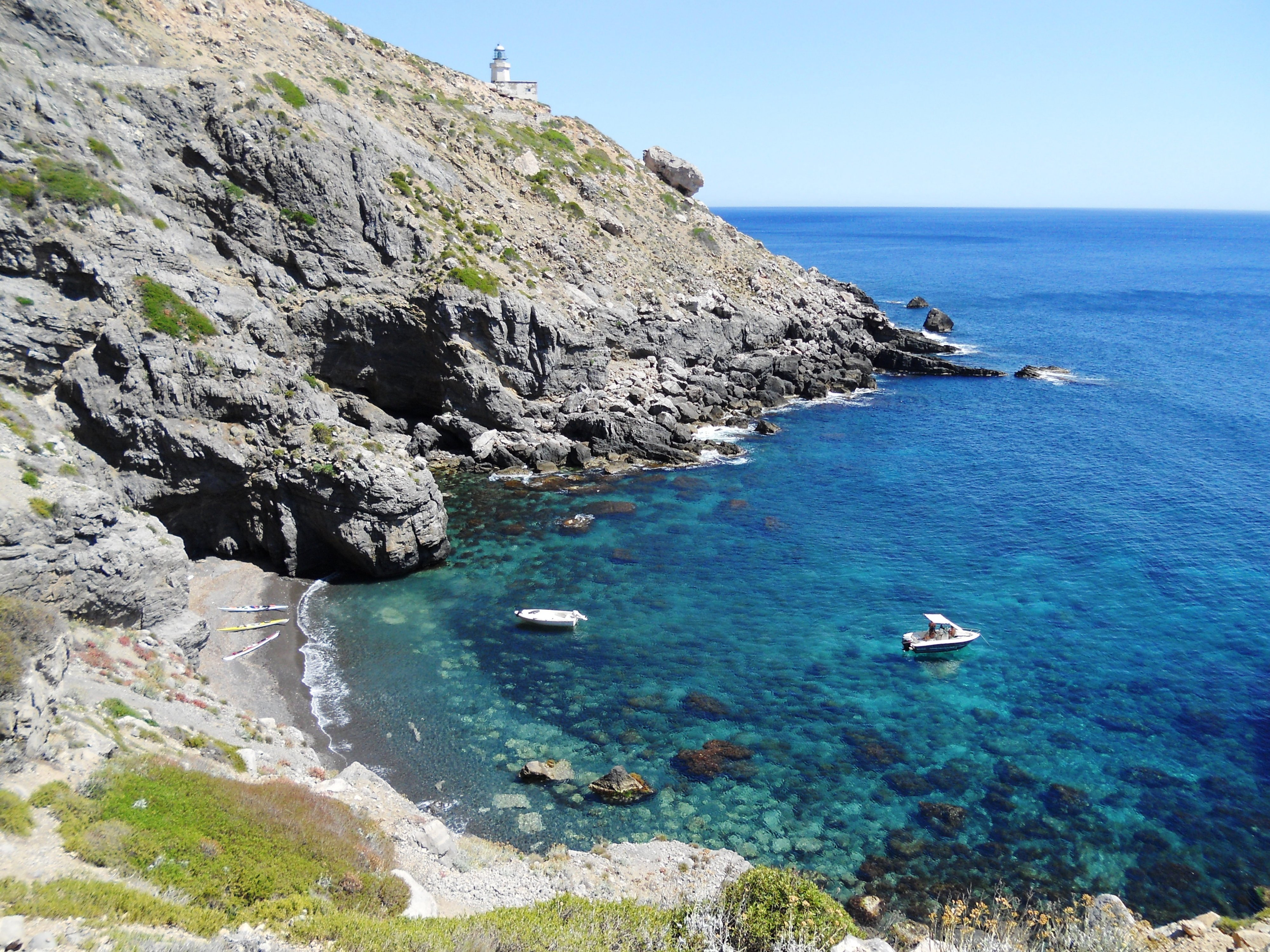
Cala Nera in Marettimo
(Black cove)

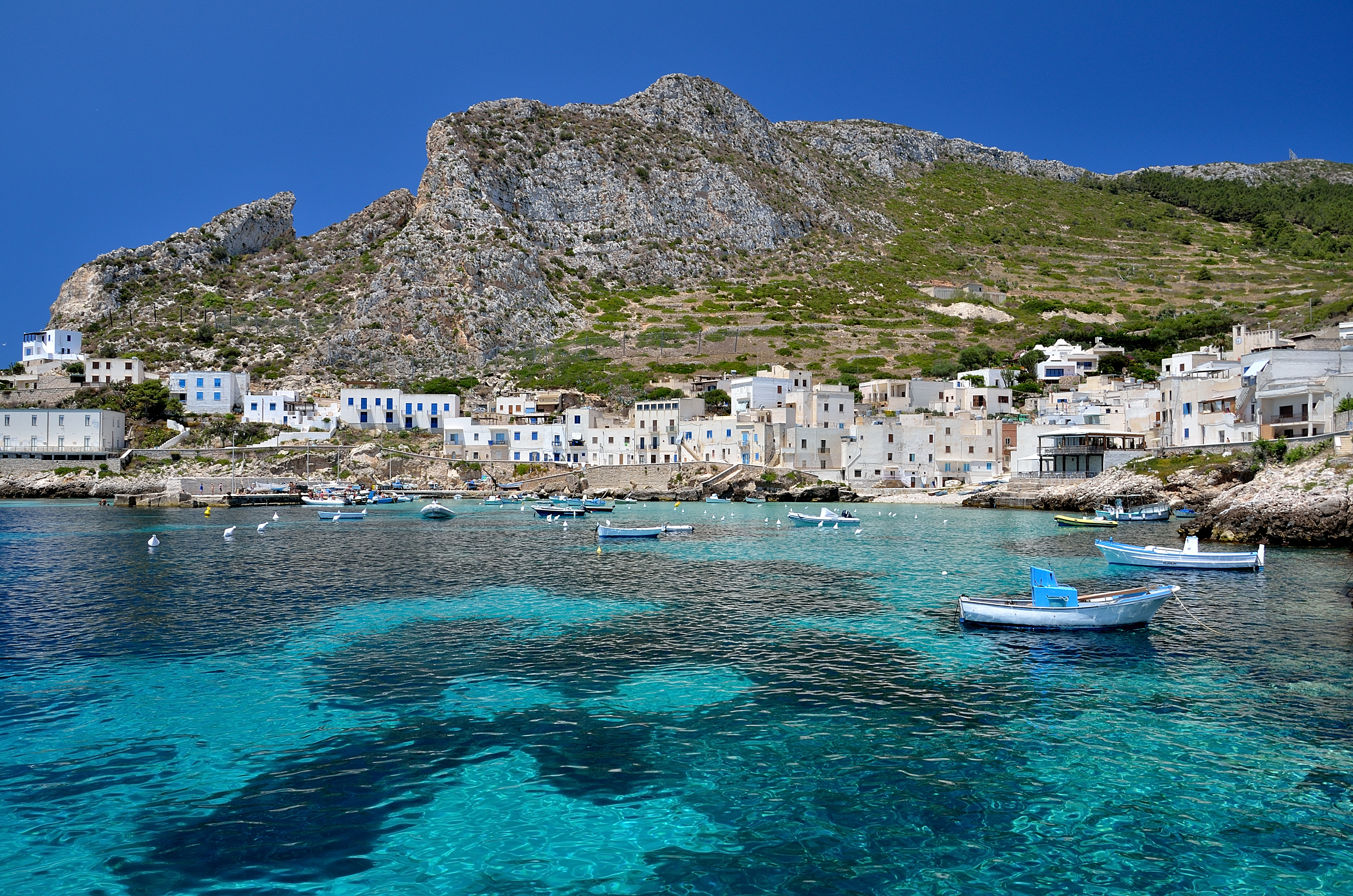
Levanzo

== See also ==
- List of islands of Italy
