= Vincenzo Florio Sr. =

Italian entrepreneur and politician (1799–1868)

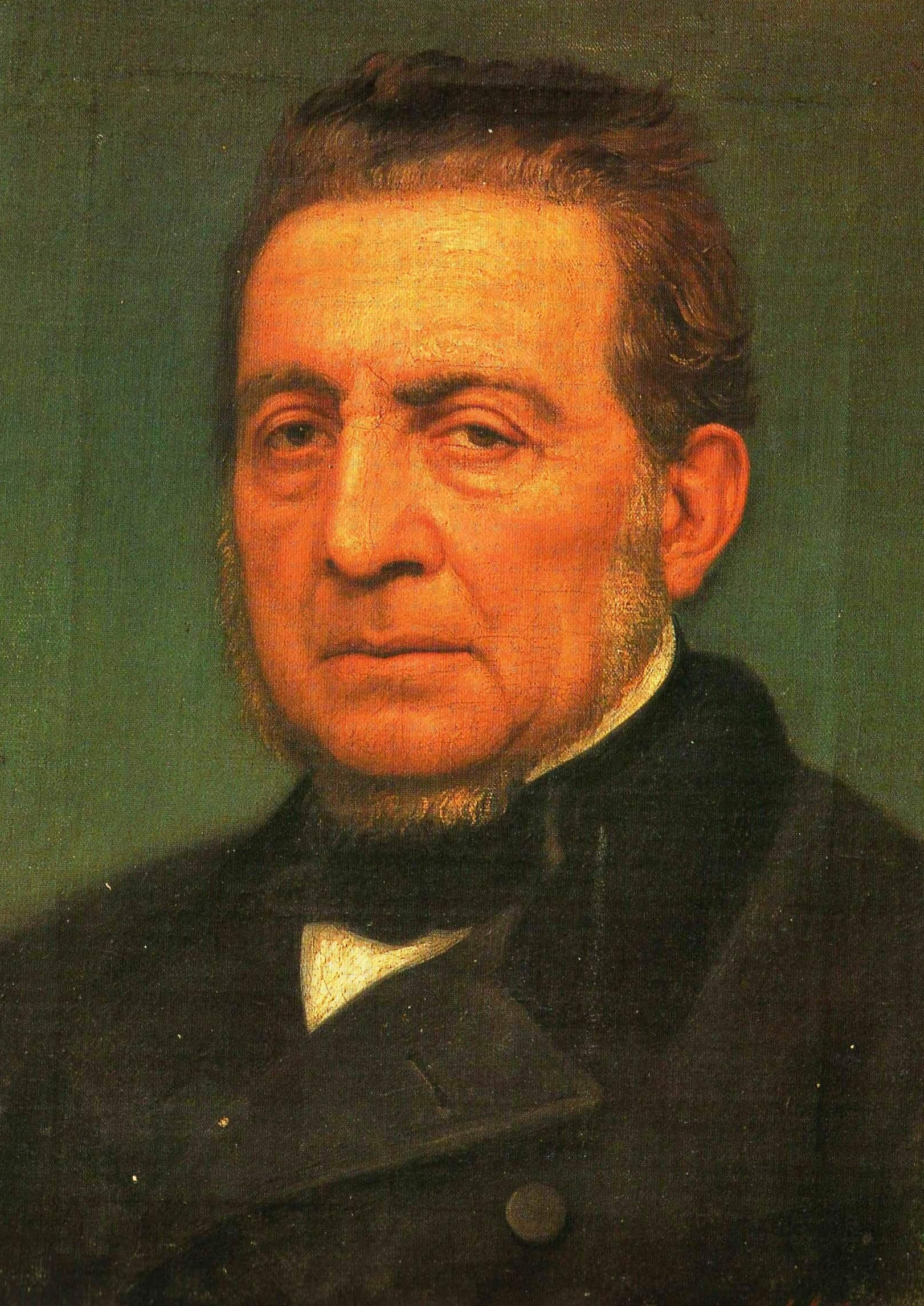
- Vincenzo Florio Sr.
- Born: 4 April 1799; Bagnara Calabra, Kingdom of Naples
- Died: 11 September 1868 (aged 69); Palermo, Kingdom of Italy
- Occupations: Entrepreneur and politician
- Known for: Member of the Florio family

Vincenzo Florio Sr. (Bagnara Calabra, 4 April 1799 – Palermo, 11 September 1868) was an Italian entrepreneur and politician, member of the rich Florio economic dynasty, one of the wealthiest Sicilian families during the late 19th century.

== Early life ==
Vincenzo Florio was born in Bagnara Calabra on 4 April 1799 to Paolo Florio and Giuseppa Safflotti. Soon after his birth, the family moved to Palermo (Sicily), where his father opened a spice and drug store in Piazza San Giacomo La Marina. He received an excellent education, under the guidance of his uncle Ignazio, he learned art and the practice of business.

Florio's father died in 1807, when Vincenzo was eight years old. This bequeathed him his spice shop, which had become relatively prosperous. Since he was too young to manage it, his uncle Ignazio Florio, a former associate of his father, directed and managed in his place the administration of commerce, which was now called Ignazio & Vincenzo Florio. Gradually, the store became increasingly important and created a name for itself as the most famous spice shop in Palermo. The financial legacy of Vincenzo and his uncle tripled in the decade between 1807 and 1817. In 1829, Ignazio Florio died without descendants, and Vincenzo became the sole heir to the family shop.

== Business career ==
Vincenzo immediately set a much faster pace in the family business, considerably expanding the scope of his activities well beyond the drug and spice shop. In 1830, he began to buy shares in the tuna fishery, which he won entirely at auction in 1838. In 1841, Vincenzo rented all the tuna fishing grounds, then an important sector of activity in Sicily, at the Aegadian Islands, launching what would become one of the most lucrative business activities of the Florio family. Vincenzo Florio has been attributed with introducing in Sicily the system of fishing with fixed nets and its canned preparation under oil, thus increasing his trade and financial wealth. In addition, he also bought shares in a Sicilian-British marine insurance company.

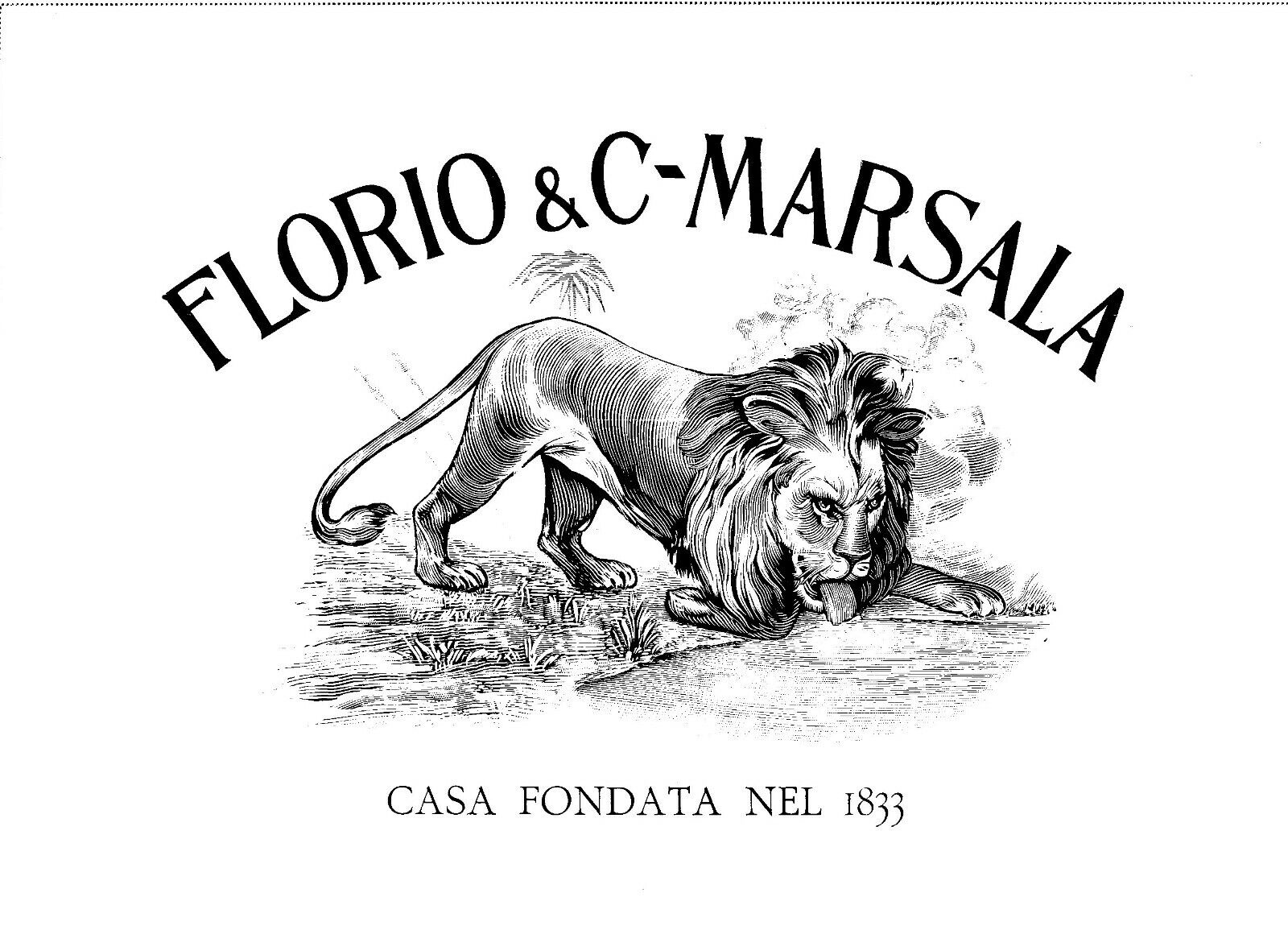
Symbol of the Florio family companies - a lion drinking from the spring

In 1832, he established a factory of Marsala wine (Cantina Florio) in Marsala. His winery was in between the ones of John Woodhouse and Benjamin Ingham (1784–1861), the original British pioneers in the Marsala wine trade. Florio became the first Italian producer of Marsala wine. He built splendid cellars in the town's tuff rock in which to produce and conserve the wine.

Florio also invested in the emerging sulfur trade, mainly to the British Empire. In 1835, he set up a company for the exploitation of the Racalmuto mines with the owner, the widow of the Prince of Pantelleria; in 1839, he managed 26 sulfur mines under lease, including that of the Prince of Palagonia, which had just been discovered in Lercara. In 1840, he co-founded the Anglo-Sicilian Sulfur Company Limited in Palermo with Ingham – also engaged in Marsala wineries – and Agostino Porry, a French expert, for the production and marketing of sulfuric acid and sulfur derivatives in a factory specially built at the foot of Monte Pellegrino.

In 1841, along with a number of other wealthy shareholders, he acquired the Oretea foundry, founded a few months earlier near the mouth of the river Oreto by the Sgroi brothers. Working in iron and bronze, and relocated to Borgo district near the old port of in Palermo in 1844, the foundry presented a hydraulic press at the Palermo Exhibition that same year, and in 1846 the first steam engine built in Sicily. His business acumen was such that he became the intermediary for the city of Palermo of the bank of the Rothschild family and as the founder of Banco Florio, he himself became a renowned banker in Palermo and Sicily with many aristocratic families and the upper middle class.

As a ship owner, he promoted the development of maritime communications with the continent, building numerous steamers. In 1840, he had started the Società dei battelli a vapore siciliani with Ingham and other small shareholders. In October 1861, soon after Sicily was incorporated into the Kingdom of Italy, he founded the Societa in Accomandita Piroscafi Postali-Ignazio & Vicenzo Florio (Florio Line) with a fleet of nine steamers.

== In politics ==
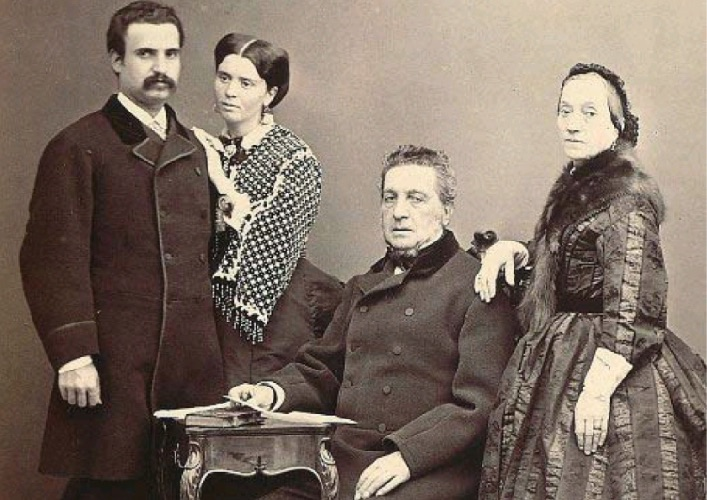
Vincenzo Florio with his wife, Giulia Portalupi, and his son, Ignazio Florio, with his wife, Giovanna D’Ondes Trigona

After the demise of the Kingdom of the Two Sicilies in 1861 and incorporation into the new Kingdom of Italy, Florio had to face the new political-economic context, especially as his relations with the past regime could have made the new Italian government less benevolent. Not that he was openly compromised, but his participation in the Sicilian revolution of 1848 had been lukewarm and conditioned by the concern to safeguard his assets and economic interests. At the time, he had refused, for lack of guarantees, a loan to the revolution for a supply of arms. However, the new rulers were more interested in establishing peaceful relations with the productive bourgeoisie of the new regions.

Nominated as senator in 1864, he died in Palermo on 11 September 1868, leaving a patrimony of 12,000,000 lire, for almost two-thirds composed by the winery in Marsala and by the interests in the shipping company. He had married Giulia Portalupi from Milan, from whom he had two daughters, Angelina and Giuseppa, and a son, Ignazio Florio Sr. (1838–1891), who took over the management of the business empire of the family.

== See also ==
- Sulfur mining in Sicily

== Sources ==
- Cancila, Orazio (1999). Palermo, Roma/Bari: Laterza (coll. « Storia delle città italiane »), ISBN 978-88-420-5781-9
- Massafra, Angelo (ed.) (1988). Il Mezzogiorno preunitario: economia, società e istituzioni, Università di Bari, Dipartimento di scienze storiche e sociali, Bari: Edizioni Dedalo
