= Formica (disambiguation) =

Formica is a genus of ants of the family Formicidae.

Formica may also refer to:

- Formica (plastic), laminated composite material
- Formica (surname), surname
- Formica Building, mixed-use building in Cincinnati, Ohio, United States of America
- Formica is one of the Aegadian Islands that hosts the Isolotto Formica Lighthouse

== See also ==
- Formia
