= Coaling =

Coaling can refer to:

- Coaling, Alabama, a town in Tuscaloosa County, Alabama, United States
- Coaling Island, an area of reclaimed land in the British Overseas Territory of Gibraltar
- Coaling (ships), the process of loading coal aboard a ship for use as fuel
