= Scogli Porcelli Lighthouse =

Scogli Porcelli
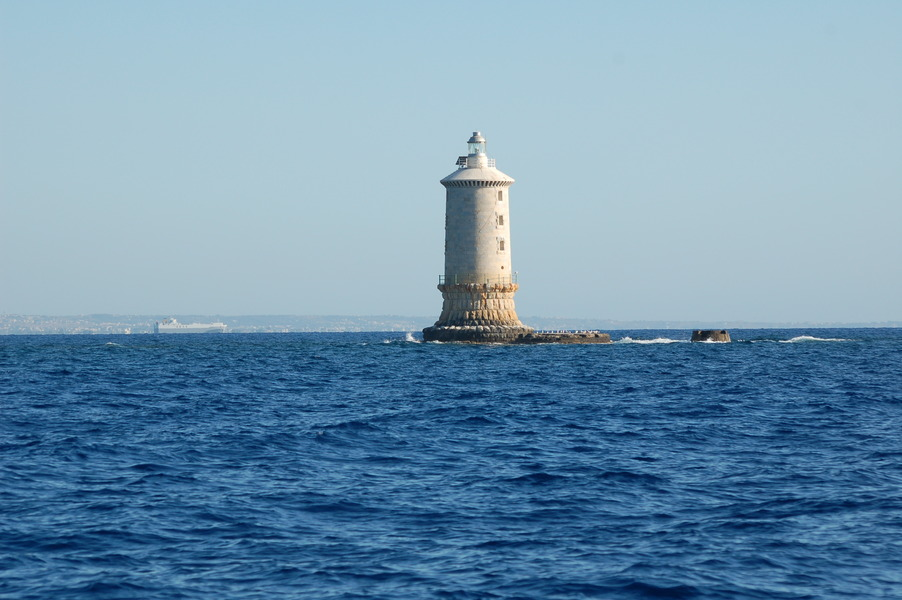
- Scogli Porcelli Lighthouse
- Location: Trapani; Sicily; Italy
- Coordinates: 38°02′38″N 12°26′22″E

Tower
- Constructed: 1903
- Foundation: concrete base
- Construction: stone tower
- Height: 25 metres (82 ft)
- Shape: massive cylindrical tower with balcony and lantern
- Markings: unpainted stone tower, white lantern, grey metallic lantern dome
- Power source: solar power
- Operator: Marina Militare

Light
- Focal height: 23 metres (75 ft)
- Lens: Type TD 375; Focal length: 187,5mm
- Intensity: MaxiHalo-60 II EFF
- Range: 11 nautical miles (20 km; 13 mi)
- Characteristic: Fl (2) W 10s.
- Italy no.: 3132 E.F.

Scogli Porcelli Lighthouse (Italian: Faro di Scogli Porcelli) is an active lighthouse located 3 nautical miles (5.6 km; 3.5 mi) offshore Trapani on a series of emerging rocks. Scogli Porcelii makes part of Aegadian Islands on the Sicily Channel.

== Description ==
The lighthouse, built in 1903, consists of a massive cylindrical tower, 25 metres (82 ft) high, with a first balcony at the height of the first floor where the entrance is placed. The structure is squat and massive and is unusual for the Italian lighthouses. The tower has a second balcony, all around the lantern, which can be reached by a spiral staircase lighted by three aligned windows decorated by a stone frame. The tower is unpainted stone, the lantern is white and the lantern dome is grey metallic. The light is positioned at 23 metres (75 ft) above sea level and emits two white flashes in a 10 seconds period visible up to a distance of 11 nautical miles (20 km; 13 mi). The lighthouse is completely automated and managed by the Marina Militare with the identification code number 3132 E.F.

== See also ==
- List of lighthouses in Italy
