= Formica (surname) =

Formica is a surname. Notable people with the surname include:

- Daniele Formica (1949–2011), Irish-born Italian actor, voice actor, theatre director, playwright and television personality
- José Fórmica (1881–1954), Spanish rower
- Lautaro Formica (born 1986), Argentine football player
- Mauro Formica (born 1988), Argentine former professional footballer
- Palma Formica (1928–2019), Italian-born American physician
- Paul Formica, American restaurateur and former Republican member of the Connecticut State Senate
- Rino Formica (born 1927), Italian politician
- Sofie Formica (born 1971), Australian radio and television presenter

== See also ==
- Formica (disambiguation)
