= Isolotto Formica Lighthouse =

Lighthouse in Italy

Isolotto Formica
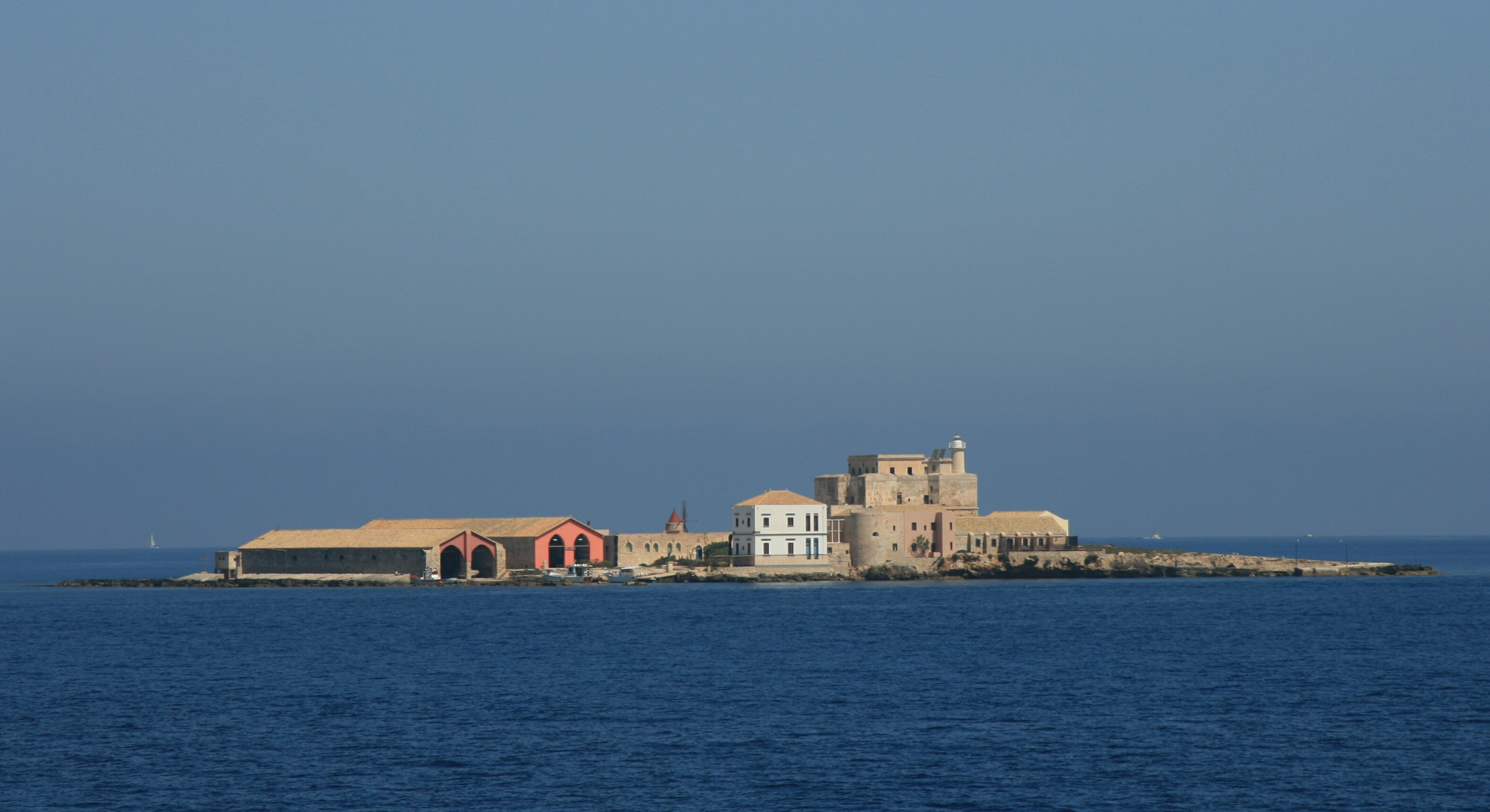
- Isolotto Formica Lighthouse
- Location: Isolotto Formica, Aegadian Islands, Sicily, Italy
- Coordinates: 37°59′21″N 12°25′32″E

Tower
- Constructed: 1858
- Foundation: concrete base
- Construction: concrete tower
- Height: 20 metres (66 ft)
- Shape: cylindrical tower with balcony and light atop a fortification corner
- Markings: white tower and balcony (current)
- Power source: solar power
- Operator: Marina Militare
- Fog signal: no

Light
- Focal height: 28 metres (92 ft)
- Range: 11 nautical miles (20 km; 13 mi)
- Characteristic: Fl W 4s.
- Italy no.: 3128 E.F.

Isolotto Formica Lighthouse (Italian: Faro di Isolotto Formica) is an active lighthouse located on an islet, 302 metres (991 ft) long and 206 metres (676 ft) wide, at 4 nautical miles (7.4 km; 4.6 mi) from Trapani in western Sicily on the Sicily Channel. The island is dominated by a quadrangular fortification, built by the Pallavicino in the mid 1600, and a Tonnara, built by the Florio in the mid 1800, which was closed in 1979. From the 1980s the island is a private property belonging to Mondo X which is involved in the recovery of drug addiction.

== Description ==
The lighthouse, built in 1858 by Genio civile under the Kingdom of the Two Sicilies, consists of a concrete cylindrical tower, 20 metres (66 ft) high, with balcony and lantern atop the north eastern bastion of the fortification. The tower and the lantern are white, the lantern dome is grey metallic. The light is positioned at 28 metres (92 ft) above sea level and emits one white flash in a 4 seconds period visible up to a distance of 11 nautical miles (20 km; 13 mi). The lighthouse is completely automated and managed by the Marina Militare with the identification code number 3128 E.F.

== See also ==
- List of lighthouses in Italy
- Aegadian Islands
