= Coaling Island =

Industrial area in Gibraltar

Coordinates: 36.1375°N 5.3576°W

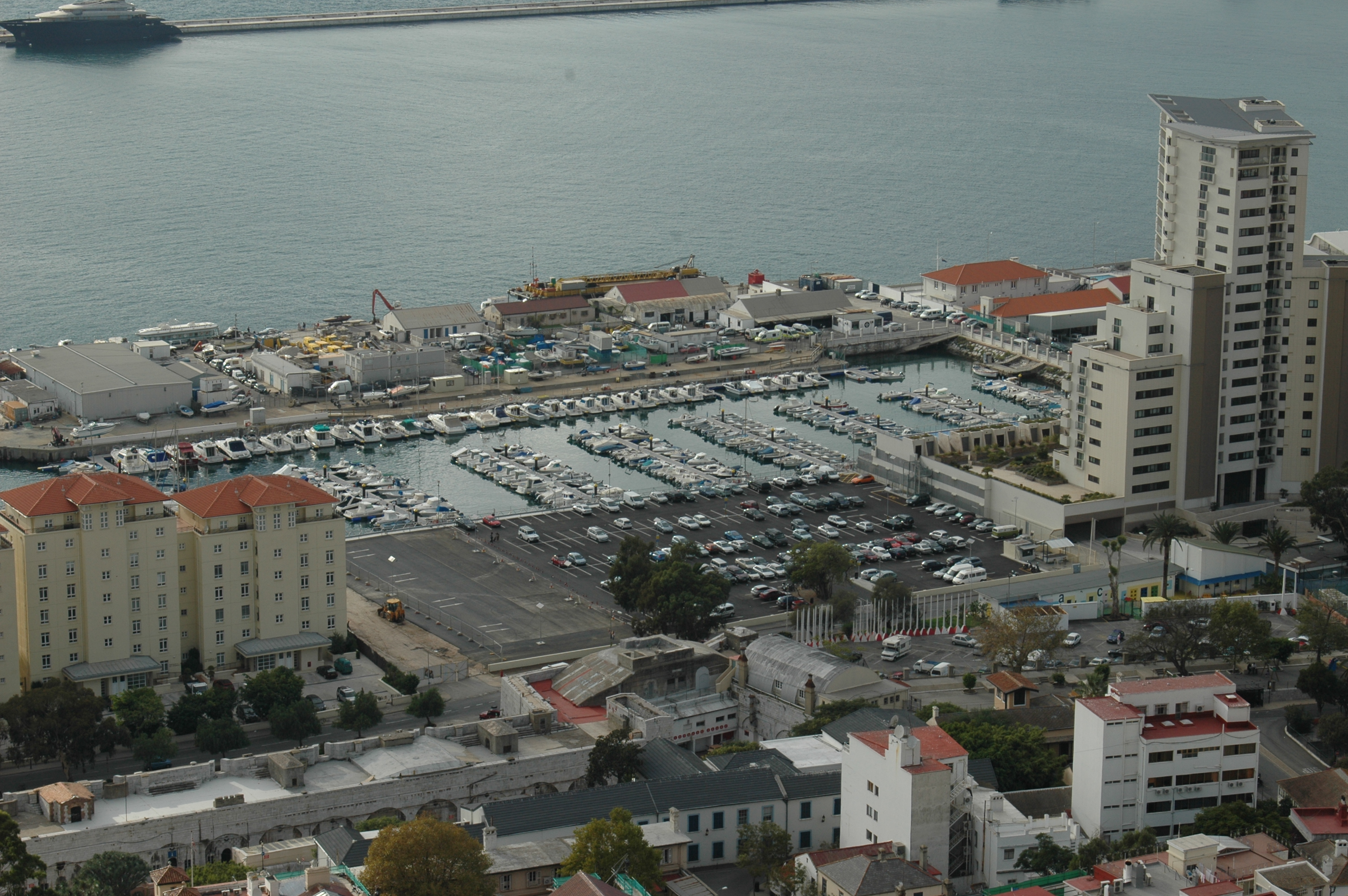
- View of Coaling Island as seen from the Rock of Gibraltar.
- Interactive map of Coaling Island
- Country: British Overseas Territory of Gibraltar

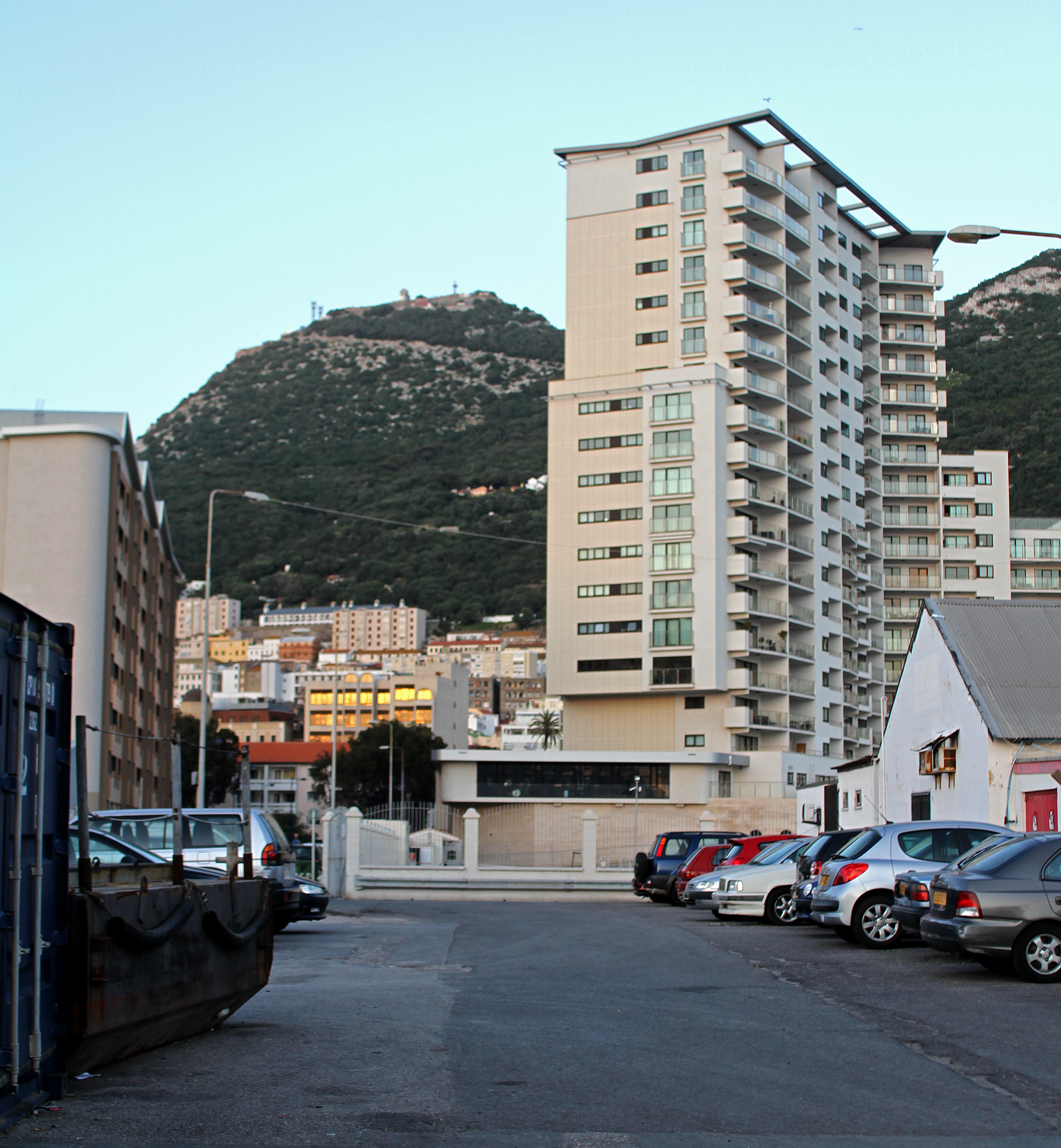
Kings Wharf and Mid Harbour Estate as viewed at the road entrance to Coaling Island.

Coaling Island is an area of reclaimed land in the British Overseas Territory of Gibraltar. It is located at the centre of the western end of Gibraltar Harbour as one of its industrial zones. It also serves to harbour Cormorant Camber which berths small boats. The Royal Gibraltar Yacht Club was located there after the Ministry of Defence Boat Squadron freed up the site.

During World War II there was a fire at Coaling Island. A Spaniard, José Martín Muñoz, who was working in Gibraltar created an explosion and fire at a fuel tank on 30 June 1943. Because of this he was under scrutiny and in August he was arrested as he attempted to place a bomb inside Ragged Staff Magazine. Muñoz was later hanged by Albert Pierrepoint.

In 2012, a Mediterranean monk seal was spotted on the jetty of the private boat owners club at Coaling Island.

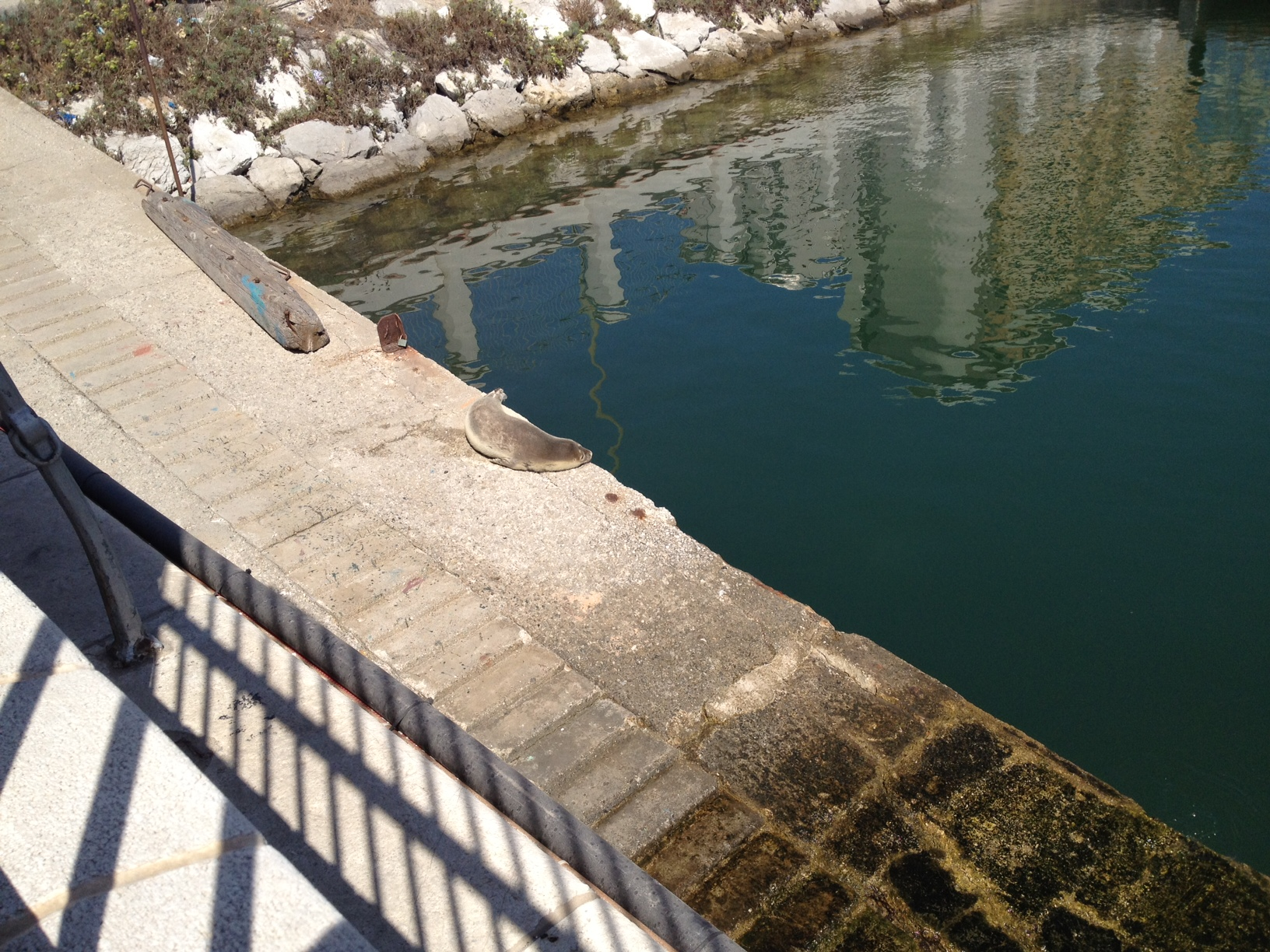
Mediterranean monk seal
