= Goldsboro Books =

Independent bookseller in London

Coordinates: 51°30′38″N 0°07′41″W

- Industry: Retail; Books
- Founded: 1999
- Founder: David Headley; Daniel Gedeon
- Headquarters: Cecil Court, Westminster, London
- Website: goldsborobooks.com

Goldsboro Books is an independent bookseller located on Cecil Court, Westminster, London. It was founded by book collectors David Headley and Daniel Gedeon in 1999.

Since 2017, Goldsboro Books has hosted the Glass Bell Award.

== History ==
In 1999, literary agent David Headley partnered with Daniel Gedeon to open their bookshop Goldsboro Books on Cecil Court, a pedestrian street in Westminster nicknamed "Bookseller's Row" due to its high volume of booksellers, which has been the case for over a century. Goldsboro Books set out to tailor its collection to rare, first and collectible editions of books. The shop gained a "reputation for championing debut novels" in addition to attracting authors and publishers for various events.

Goldsboro Books began a digital Book of the Month club in 2007, through which the bookseller garnered an online following.

In 2025, Goldsboro Books was among 10 London booksellers nominated for Independent Bookshop of the Year.

== Glass Bell Award ==
The Glass Bell Award was launched in 2017. It rewards a contemporary fiction novel with a glass bell and a prize of £2,000.

| Year | Winner | Shortlist | Longlist | Ref. |
|---|---|---|---|---|
| 2017 | Everyone Brave is Forgiven, Chris Cleave | Pendulum, Adam Hamdy; The Wolf Den, Beth Lewis; The North Water, Ian McGuire; Anatomy of a Soldier, Harry Parker; The Underground Railroad, Colson Whitehead | All the Birds in the Sky, Charlie Jane Anders; Dark Matter, Blake Crouch; My Name is Leon, Kit de Waal; I See You, Clare Mackintosh; The Sport of Kings, C.E. Morgan; Sleeping Giants, Sylvain Neuvel; My Name is Lucy Barton, Elizabeth Strout | |
| 2018 | The Heart's Invisible Furies, John Boyne | The Nix, Nathan Hill; Eleanor Oliphant is Completely Fine, Gail Honeyman; Good Me Bad Me, Ali Land; You Don't Know Me, Imran Mahmood; The Silent Companions, Laura Purcell | American War, Omar El Akkad; The Word is Murder, Anthony Horowitz; The Innocent War, Amy Lloyd; Reservoir 13, Jon McGregor; The Ice, Laline Paull; Behind Her Eyes, Sarah Pinborough; My Absolute Darling, Gabriel Tallent | |
| 2019 | Vox, Christina Dalcher | Snap, Belinda Bauer; Puppet Show, M. W. Craven; Swan Song, Kelleigh Greenberg-Jephcott; The Tattooist of Auschwitz, Heather Morris | Our House, Louise Candlish; Ordinary People, Diana Evans; The Poison Bed, EC Fremantle; An Ocean of Minutes, Thea Lim; Dear Mrs Bird, AJ Pearce; Memo from Turner, Tim Willocks | |
| 2020 | Daisy Jones and the Six, Taylor Jenkins Reid | My Sister, the Serial Killer, Oyinkan Braithwaite; Girl, Woman, Other, Bernardine Evaristo; The Lost Ones, Anita Frank; The Starless Sea, Erin Morgenstern; Blood & Sugar, Laura Shepherd-Robinson | Nothing Important Happened Today, Will Carver; Imaginary Friend, Stephen Chbosky; The Second Sleep, Robert Harris; Darkdawn, Jay Kristoff; The Silent Patient, Alex Michaelides; The Farm, Joanne Ramos | |
| 2021 | People of Abandoned Character, Clare Whitfield | The Girl with the Louding Voice, Abi Daré; The Court of Miracles, Kester Grant; Apeirogon, Colum McCann; Eight Detectives, Alex Pavesi; The Devil and the Dark Water, Stuart Turton | The Sin Eater, Megan Campisi; Blacktop Wasteland, S. A. Cosby; The Familiar Dark, Amy Engel; The First Sister, Linden Lewis; Three Hours, Rosamund Lupton; The Thursday Murder Club, Richard Osman | |
| 2022 | The Wolf Den, Elodie Harper | Mrs March, Virginia Feito; Sistersong, Lucy Holland; Ariadne, Jennifer Saint; Daughters, Laura Shepherd-Robinson; We Are All Birds of Uganda, Hafsa Zayyan | Tall Bones, Anna Bailey; The Last Thing to Burn, Will Dean; The Other Black Girl, Zakiya Dalila Harris; The Prophets, Robert Jones Jr; Threadneedle, Cari Thomas; The Book of Form and Emptiness, Ruth Ozeki | |
| 2023 | When We Were Birds, Ayanna Lloyd Banwo | The Levithian, Rosie Andrews; Notes on an Execution, Danya Kukafka; Pandora, Susan Stokes-Chapman; Metronome, Tom Watson; Tomorrow, and Tomorrow, and Tomorrow, Gabrielle Zevin | Trust, Hernan Diaz; The Final Strife, Saara El-Arifi; Carrie Soto Is Back, Taylor Jenkins Reid; The Second Sight of Zachary Cloudesley, Sean Lusk; Wahala, Nikki May; Young Mungo, Douglas Stewart | |
| 2024 | Clytemnestra, Costanza Casati | Strange Sally Diamond, Liz Nugent; The Turnglass, Gareth Rubin; Lady Macbethad, Isabelle Schuler; The Square of Stevens, Laura Shepherd Robinson; In Memoriam, Alice Winn | The List, Yomi Adegoke; Chain-Gang All-Stars, Nana Kwame Adjei-Brenyah; The Silent Man, David Fennell; Weyward, Emilia Hart; None of This Is True, Lisa Jewell; Godkiller, Hannah Kaner; Yellowface, R. F. Kuang; The Fraud, Zadie Smith | |
| 2025 | A Little Trickerie, Rosanna Pike | The Cautious Traveller's Guide to the Wastelands, Sarah Brooks; James, Percival Everett; The List of Suspicious Things, Jennie Godfrey; There Are Rivers in the Sky, Elif Shafak; All the Colours of the Dark, Chris Whitaker | The Warm Hands of Ghosts, Katherine Arden; The Book of Doors, Gareth Brown; The Silverblood Promise, James Logan; Hunted, Abir Mukherjee; Berlin Duet, S. W. Perry; The Kellerby Code, Jonny Sweet | |
