= Portrait of Donna Franca Florio =

Painting by Giovanni Boldini

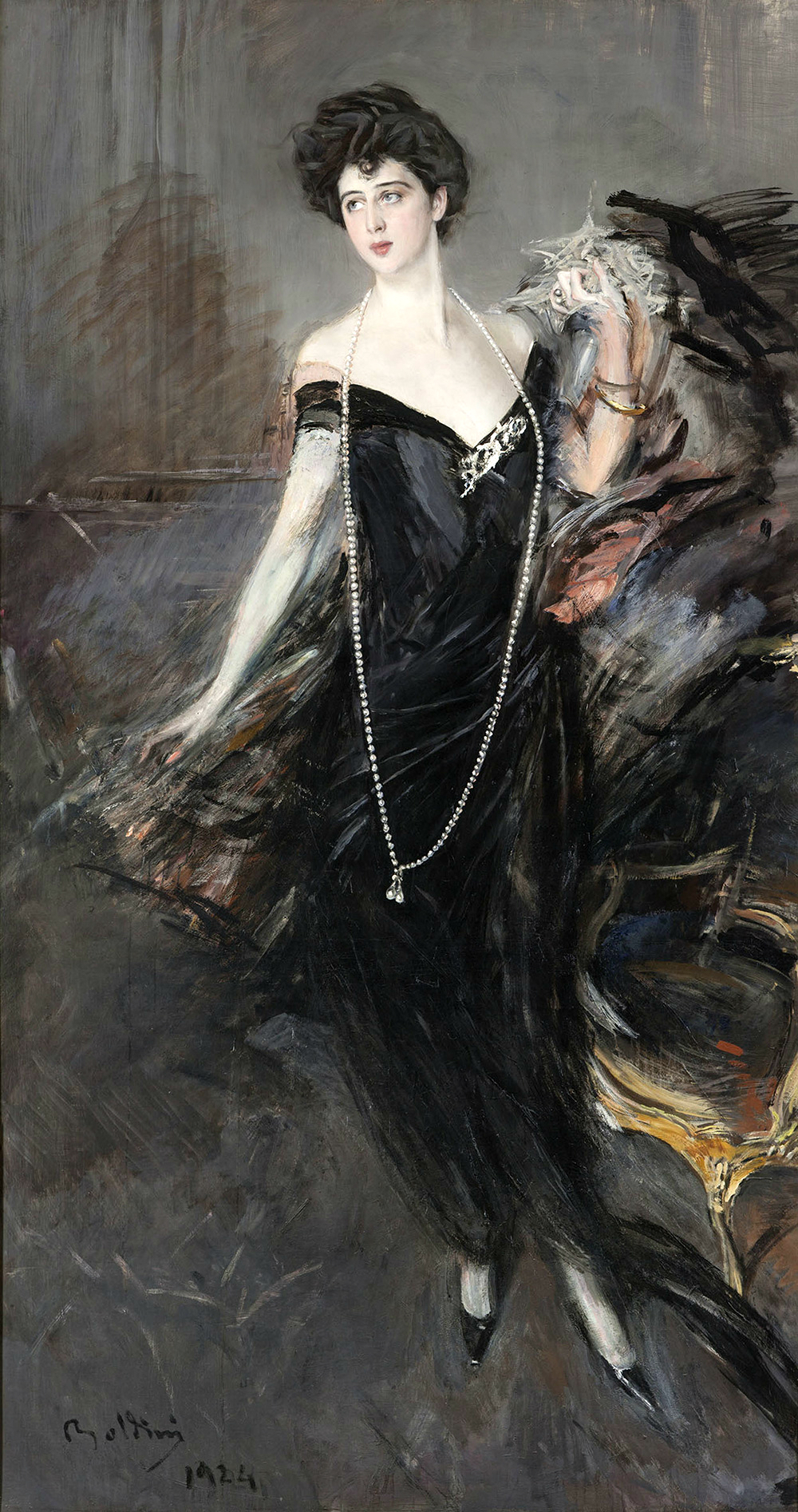
- Artist: Giovanni Boldini
- Year: 1901–1924
- Medium: Oil on canvas
- Dimensions: 221 cm × 119.4 cm (87 in × 47.0 in)
- Location: Palazzo Mazzarino; Palermo

The Portrait of Donna Franca Florio, or Portrait of Mrs. Franca Florio, is an oil on canvas painting by the Italian painter Giovanni Boldini. It was created in 1901 but retouched several times, until the current version, signed and dated in 1924. Since 2017, the painting is in the Palazzo Mazzarino, in Palermo.

== History ==
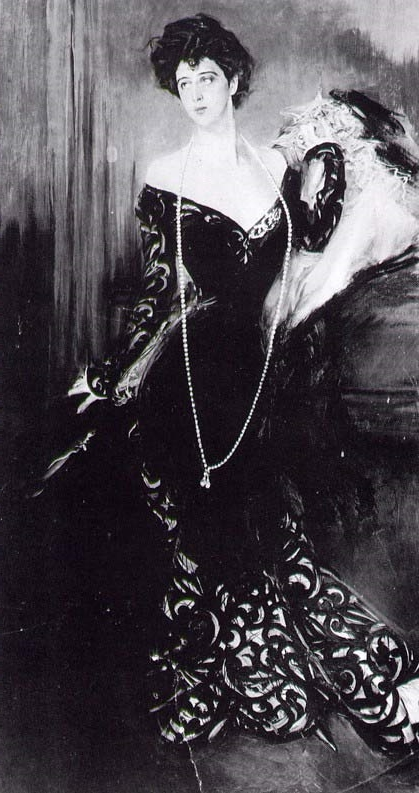
The original version of the painting (1901) in a photograph of the same year depicts Donna Franca in a typical early-20th-century fashion

The subject of the painting is the famous Donna Franca Florio, otherwise known as the "Queen of Sicily". She was a member of a Sicilian aristocratic family who entered by marriage the richest business family on the island. Donna Franca was the undisputed celebrity of all the events of the high society of Palermo. She spoke four languages fluently and her beauty and elegance had granted her many male admirers, like the poet Gabriele D'Annunzio and Kaiser Wilhelm II of Germany. An icon of the Belle Époque, Donna Franca was also a skilled entrepreneur, helping her husband Ignazio Florio Jr. in the family business.

In 1901 Ignazio Florio commissioned Boldini to make a painting that would immortalize the radiant beauty and elegance of his wife. Boldini moved from Paris to Palermo, where he was a guest of the Florios, thus creating the portrait. The original version of the work depicted Donna Franca wrapped in a regal black evening dress embellished with various golden embroidery, also equipped with long sleeves with inlays on the cuffs. Boldini would intervene on the canvas two more times. The final time was in 1924, when he inserted a chair and revealed the noblewoman's arms, updating the clothing to the fashion of the 1920s, eliminating the embroidery, sleeves and corset, with the dress falling straight and short to the ankles. Donna Franca's personality seems suited to the liberating fashion of the Roaring Twenties; however, her looks seem not to have aged, since she was 27 years old in the original version, and now she is 50. Thus she appears as a kind of timeless beauty.

== Description ==
In the Portrait of Donna Franca Florio the poetics of Boldinian femininity are fully recognised, so much that the work doesn't hesitate to enhance the astonishing charm of the portrayed woman, but also introduces elements of modernity.

Depending on the technique, sometimes summary, other times descriptive and attentive to detail, Boldini also seems to indicate to the observer those pictorial passages that have particularly captured his attention: the face, of a pearly whiteness, where the red lips are crossed by an imperceptible smile, and her deep gray eyes, and the heavy and imposing necklace, containing 365 pearls, one for each day of the year.

Franca's body, wrapped in the swirling folds of the black velvet dress, is outlined by long and snappy brushstrokes, rightly defined by critics as "saber strokes", with which Boldini seems to "crystallize" the splendid appearance of his sitter. The electric elegance of Boldini's brushstrokes, which with their rapid succession fill the canvas with a great energy, is the subject of a thoughtful statement by Gaetano Boldini, the painter's brother, from 1926: "His way of painting was very strange, since he didn't make the model pose but wanted her to move in his front to allow him to impress more clearly her vital features on the canvas".

== Provenance ==
The canvas, exhibited at the Venice Biennale in 1903, was only completed in 1924: in that year, however, the Florio family was suffering a terrible economic collapse and was therefore unable to purchase it. Boldini decided to sell it to Baron Rothschild, in 1927–1928, who brought it to the United States. The work was put back on sale at Christie's by Rothschild's descendants on 1 November 1995, and then reappeared on auctions on 25 October 2005, when it was sold at Sotheby's New York City and purchased by the Acqua Marcia Society by Francesco Bellavista Caltagirone, owner of several luxury hotels in Sicily. It was that way that the Portrait of Donna Franca Florio, returned to Palermo, even not for public display, being exhibited in the Grand Hotel Villa Igea, the former residence of the Florios.

In 2017, the painting was auctioned once again, as part of the liquidation procedures for the artistic and antique furnishings of the hotels of the Caltagirone company, which had gone bankrupt that year. Numerous awareness and crowdfunding campaigns were promoted to purchase the Portrait of Donna Franca Florio, so that it would remain in Palermo. On 30 April the winning bid of 1,133,000 euros was placed by the marquises Marida and Annibale Berlingieri and because of that the canvas has been since then exhibited at Palazzo Mazzarino, in Palermo.
