= Conversation at the Café =

Painting by Giovanni Boldini

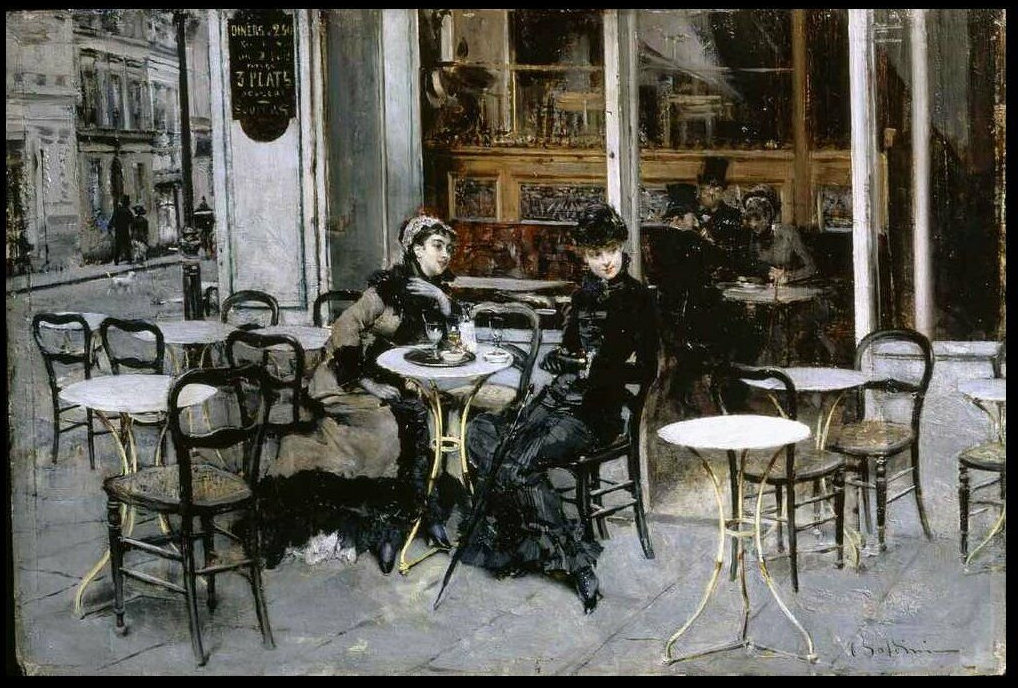
- Artist: Giovanni Boldini
- Year: c. 1879
- Medium: Oil on panel
- Dimensions: 28 cm × 41 cm (11 in × 16 in)
- Location: Private collection

Conversation at the Café is an oil on panel painting by Italian painter Giovanni Boldini, created c. 1879. It is held in a private collection.

== History and description ==
Boldini moved to Paris in 1871, where he had the opportunity to witness a lively, modern and frenetic city. In those years, the French capital wanted to forget the recent defeat at the Franco-Prussian War. Paris was therefore populated by theatres, museums, restaurants and trendy cafes. The cafés were places frequented by the French artistic and literary elite, where new ideas and aesthetic theories were fervently discussed. They were also one of the favorite themes of the Impressionists, who view them as an excellent pretext to depict the contemporary lifestyle, without abandoning outdoor urban views. The Impressionists themselves were moreover used to meet at cafés to discuss their pictorial experiences.

Boldini too devoted himself to the depiction of café scenes, resulting in paintings such as this Conversation at the Café. This is a very interesting painting not only from an artistic point of view but also concerning his private life, since the painter was romantically linked to both the two French women depicted here, his model Berthe, who shouldn't be confused with the painter Berthe Morisot, and the Countess Gabrielle de Rasty. Both women correspond to two very different types. Berthe was a regular model for Boldini in the 1870s, and also became his lover. She corresponds to a discret and candid female typology, devoid of malice, a kind of "a little angel-girl with blue eyes". The Countess Gabrielle de Rasty, a married woman who was also romantically involved with Boldini, on the other hand, was a very different kind of woman, since she was fully aware of her beauty and corporality, and displayed it boldly, demonstrating a flirtatious and impertinent sensuality. The painting can be interpreted as depicting the contrast between the two women who were his lovers.

In this small painting, Boldini brings together, albeit in a fictitious pictorial space, these two seductive worlds. A group composed of two men and a woman is seen inside the café. Both women, who had radically different personalities, are the only people seated at the outdoor tables of a Parisian café. They display very elegant clothing: Berthe is wearing a so-called "princess" dress, one piece from neckline to hem, completed by a black velvet jacket, she is dressed totally in black, including black gloves and a black hat, a favourite colour of hers, and Gabrielle wears a long grey-brown fur-trimmed coat. They are engaged in a conversation and have insinuating and sensuous poses. Gabrielle, who is on the left, is dominating the conversation and her gaze intrigues and ensnares the observer, with her look and the sensuality of her body and elegant fashion. Berthe, on the contrary, feigns disinterest at the conversation and, yielding to an instinctive unease, turns her gaze to her left, towards an event that seems to be taking place outside the pictorial space. A palpable contrast therefore emerges, both from a pictorial and erotic point of view, between these two women so different and apart from each other. In this case, like an antithetical couple, Berthe, the blonde, and Gabrielle, the brunette, embody the past and the sentimental and professional future of the painter, since Berthe had been the muse of his early Parisian paintings, as well as his lover. The artist himself, on the other hand, deepened this divergence in numerous other works: Berthe, in fact, will always be the incarnation of the "young romantic woman" (StileArte). Concerning Gabrielle de Rasty, however, Boldini would use her disturbing sensuality in other works, since she would be a usual sitter for his portraits, some of them with a libertine flavor.

Boldini use of a palette of grays and blacks reflects his interest on Dutch painting and announces his change of style in the next decade. His quick brushstroke does not prevent him from paying particular attention to detail, especially in the description of the interior of the café, with its three characters who also seem to indulge in the joys of gossip.
