= Paris Apartment =

Paris Apartment may refer to:

- A Paris Apartment, 2014 novel by Michelle Gable
- The Paris Apartment, 2022 novel by Lucy Foley
