= The Seven Deaths of Evelyn Hardcastle =

Novel by Stuart Turton

- UK 2018 cover
- Author: Stuart Turton
- Publisher: Raven Books
- Publication date: 8 February 2018
- Pages: 528
- ISBN: 978-1408889565

The Seven Deaths of Evelyn Hardcastle (published in United States as The 7½ Deaths of Evelyn Hardcastle) is a novel by Stuart Turton which won the Best First Novel prize in the 2018 Costa Book Awards and reached number one on The Saturday Times Bestseller list.

== Plot ==
At the start of the book, a man awakes in a forest, suffering from memory loss, and calling for someone named Anna. He can't remember his own name and has no memories of anything before waking. He finds his way to a manor, where associates tell him that he is a doctor called Sebastian Bell who is attending a party thrown by the Hardcastles, the family of Blackheath Manor. After he falls asleep that night, he awakes to find himself in the body of the butler, and it is the morning of the previous day.

He learns that his real name is Aiden Bishop and that he has eight days inhabiting eight different party guests, or “hosts,” to solve the murder of Evelyn Hardcastle, which will take place at 11pm at the party that evening. He is only allowed to leave Blackheath once he finds the killer. If he is unable to solve the mystery in the eight allocated days, the process will restart and he will awake again in the body of Sebastian Bell with his memory wiped. He also learns that there are two other people competing to discover the identity of the murderer, and that only one person will be permitted to leave Blackheath.

== Title ==
According to Turton, the novel's title was changed in America since it was similar to the previously published The Seven Husbands of Evelyn Hugo.

== Reception ==
The Seven Deaths of Evelyn Hardcastle reached number one on The Saturday Times Bestseller list and number five on The Sunday Times Bestseller list, earning critical acclaim.

The Guardian's review said "With time loops, body swaps and a psychopathic footman, this is a dazzling take on the murder mystery", while The Times said "The plot of this complex, fascinating and bewildering murder-mystery is impossible to summarise" and called it "an astonishingly polished debut".

=== Awards ===
The Seven Deaths of Evelyn Hardcastle won the Best First Novel prize in the 2018 Costa Book Awards and Best Novel in the 2018 Books Are My Bag Readers' Awards, as voted for by booksellers. In the same year, it was shortlisted for a New Writers' Award at the Specsavers National Book Awards, Debut of the Year at The British Book Awards, and longlisted for a New Blood Dagger and Gold Dagger at the CWA Awards. Val McDermid selected Stuart Turton, author of The Seven Deaths of Evelyn Hardcastle, to appear on her prestigious New Blood panel at the Theakstons Old Peculiar Crime Writing Festival. In 2019, it was shortlisted for Best Debut Novel at the Strand Magazine Critics Awards and longlisted for The Glass Bell Award. In 2021, the Japanese edition of the novel, translated by Kazuyo Misumi and published in 2019, was shortlisted for the Best Translated Honkaku Mystery of the Decade (2010–2019).

== Adaptation ==
In December 2020, it was announced that Netflix had bought the rights to a seven-part series adaptation of the novel produced by House Productions, who had acquired the television rights in 2018, to be written by Sophie Petzal. On January 17, 2023, it was reported that, after two years of development, Netflix had cancelled the planned series.
