= Marthe de Florian =

French courtesan and socialite

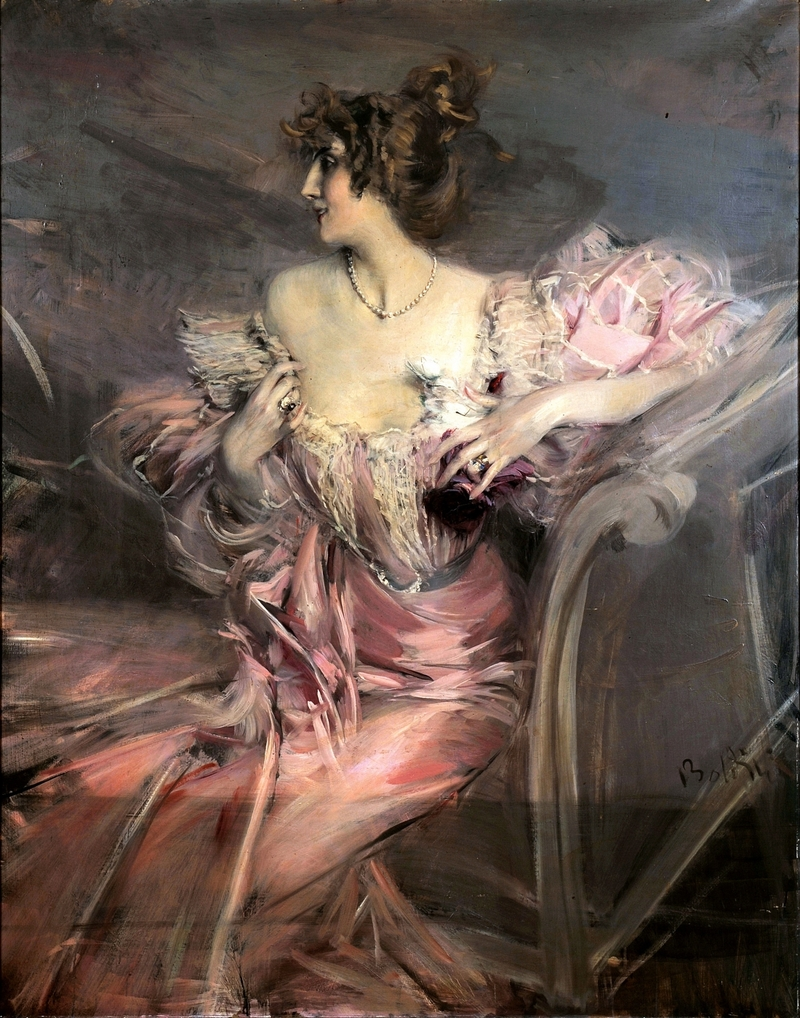
- Portrait of de Florian by Giovanni Boldini (1898)
- Born: Mathilde Héloïse Beaugiron; 9 September 1864; 18th arrondissement, Paris; Second French Empire
- Died: 29 August 1939 (aged 74); Trouville-sur-Mer, Normandy; French Third Republic
- Occupation: Courtesan
- Children: 2
- Parent(s): Jean Beaugiron; Henriette Eloïse Bara

Signature
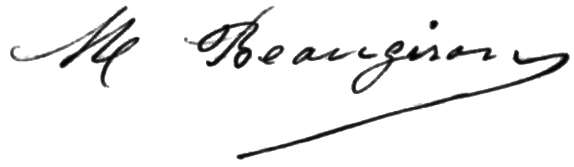

Marthe de Florian (born Mathilde Héloïse Beaugiron; 9 September 1864 – 29 August 1939) was a French demi-mondaine and socialite during the Belle Époque. She was known for having famous lovers including Georges Clemenceau, Pierre Waldeck-Rousseau, Paul Deschanel, Gaston Doumergue, Robert de Montesquiou, and Giovanni Boldini. Initially forgotten from history, her story resurfaced in 2010 after her belongings were discovered in her Parisian apartment, located at 2 square La Bruyère in the 9th arrondissement, untouched for decades. The discovery of her apartment was the inspiration behind Michelle Gable's novel A Paris Apartment.

== Early life and youth ==
Marthe de Florian was born as Mathilde Héloïse Beaugiron on 9 September 1864 in the 18th arrondissement of Paris, eldest daughter of Jean Beaugiron and Henriette Eloïse Bara. She had two brothers who died as infants, Jules Louis Beaugiron and Jules Beaugiron, and a sister, Henriette Joséphine Beaugiron.

On 12 October 1882, at the age of 18, she gave birth to her first son, Henri Beaugiron, whose paternity was unknown and who was born at 69 Rue Condorcet in the 9th arrondissement. Marthe de Florian stated on the birth certificate that her profession was embroiderer. Henri died three months after his birth.

At the age of 19, on 7 April 1884, de Florian gave birth to a second son also called Henri Beaugiron, who was born at 100 Rue Saint-Lazare. He spent his life in Paris and died on 12 May 1966, while living at 2 Rue La Bruyère. While his paternity was also stated as "unknown", it is speculatively possible that his father was the married banker Auguste Albert Gaston Florian Mollard, a lover of Marthe, from whom she presumably took the name "de Florian"

== The Apartment ==
Marthe de Florian's apartment is a 1,500 square foot apartment located on the fourth floor at 2, Square La Bruyère in the 9th arrondissement of Paris, not far from Sainte-Trinité. She died in 1939. Her son, Henri Beaugiron, who witnessed and signed his mother's death record, was living in the apartment at the time of her death. The apartment was eventually inherited by Solange Beaugiron, Henri's daughter, a playwright who sometimes used the pseudonym "Solange Beldo".

During World War II de Florian's granddaughter, Solange, escaped from the Nazis and settled in the South of France, never to come back to clear the apartment after her father's death in 1966. The rent and expenses were paid regularly until her death in June 2010 at the age of 91. As a result, everything the apartment contained, including many paintings, furniture and all the usual elements of early 20th-century life remained intact for several decades.

According to death records, Henri Beaugiron died in the apartment at 2, Square La Bruyère in 1966. According to Marc Ottavi, the art expert who was present when the apartment was opened in 2010, there were papers in the apartment dated as late as 1955.

The contents of the apartment, including the Boldini painting, were auctioned on 28 September 2010.

== The Portrait ==
Among the many paintings discovered in the apartment was a portrait depicting Marthe de Florian herself in a beautiful pink muslin evening dress, painted by one of her lovers, the artist Giovanni Boldini. The portrait had never been listed, exhibited or published, however a visiting card with a scribbled love note from the painter was found in the apartment, and a short reference found in a book from 1951 commissioned by the artist's widow Emilia Cardona also confirmed the provenance of the painting. According to the auction expert, the work was painted around 1900–1910. After its rediscovery and subsequent research into its provenance, the painting was put to auction with a starting price of €300,000, but the sale price rocketed as ten bidders pushed the final price to €3 million, a world record for the artist.
