= Clare Whitfield =

English novelist (born 1978)

- Born: Clare Riley; 1978 (age 47–48)
- Education: Middlesex University (BA); University of Winchester (MA)
- Years active: 2019–present
- Spouse: Duncan Whitfield
- Children: 1
- Website: clarewhitfieldbooks.com

Clare Riley Whitfield (born 1978) is an English historical novelist. Her debut novel People of Abandoned Character (2020) won the Goldsboro Books Glass Bell Award. Her third novel Poor Girls (2024) was shortlisted for the CWA Historical Dagger.

== Early life ==
Clare Riley was born the youngest of four and grew up on the St Helier estate in Morden, South London and then moved to Sutton. Whitfield studied dance and graduated with a Bachelor of Arts (BA) in Visual and Performing Arts from Middlesex University. She began her career in publishing and marketing. In her 30s, she completed a Master of Arts (MA) in Creative and Critical Writing at the University of Winchester.

== Career ==
In 2019, Whitfield signed her first publishing deal with Head of Zeus (a Bloomsbury Books imprint), through which she published her debut novel People of Abandoned Character in 2020. The Gothic novel follows a Victorian trainee nurse Susannah who begins to suspect her husband is Jack the Ripper. People of Abandoned Character won the 2021 Goldsboro Books Glass Bell Award. It was also shortlisted for the Debut Crown at the Historical Writers Association (HWA) Awards.

This was followed by Whitfield's second novel The Gone and the Forgotten, also published via Head of Zeus in 2022. Set in 1993 Shetland, the novel takes the theme of family secrets, inspired by Whitfield's own discovery that her father was the product of an affair between her paternal grandmother and a Canadian soldier.

Whitfield signed two further books with Head of Zeus in October 2022. The first of these was her third historical novel Poor Girls, published in 2024, which follows a 1920s London crime gang of women called the Forty Elephants. Poor Girls was shortlisted for the Historical Dagger at the 2025 Crime Writers' Association (CWA) Awards.

== Personal life ==
Whitfield lives in Southampton with her husband Duncan Whitfield, a tattoo artist. She has a daughter.

In 2016, Whitfield was diagnosed with Hashimoto's disease (hyperthyroidism). After her Glass Bell Award win, she sought an autism spectrum assessment.

== Bibliography ==
=== Novels ===
- People of Abandoned Character (2020)
- The Gone and the Forgotten (2022)
- Poor Girls (2024)
- The Last Handmaid (2026)
- The Confidante (TBA)

== Accolades ==
Year	Award	Category	Title	Result	Ref.
2021	Goldsboro Books Glass Bell Award		People of Abandoned Character	Won	
2021	Historical Writers Association (HWA) Awards	Debut Crown	People of Abandoned Character	Shortlisted	
2025	Crime Writers' Association (CWA) Awards	Historical Dagger	Poor Girls	Shortlisted	
2026	Wilbur Smith Adventure Writing Prize	Published Novel	Poor Girls	Pending	
