= A Paris Apartment =

2014 novel by Michelle Gable

- Author: Michelle Gable
- Publisher: Thomas Dunne Books
- Publication date: April 22, 2014
- Pages: 384
- ISBN: 9781250048738
- Website: A Paris Apartment

A Paris Apartment is a novel by Michelle Gable. Set in Paris, France, the book follows a Sotheby's auctioneer who discovers a wide range of antiques and collectibles in an apartment that had been locked for 70 years. It was first published by Thomas Dunne Books for St. Martin's Press in 2014 and eventually appeared on The New York Times Best Seller list in 2016 and is a USA Today bestseller.

== Background ==
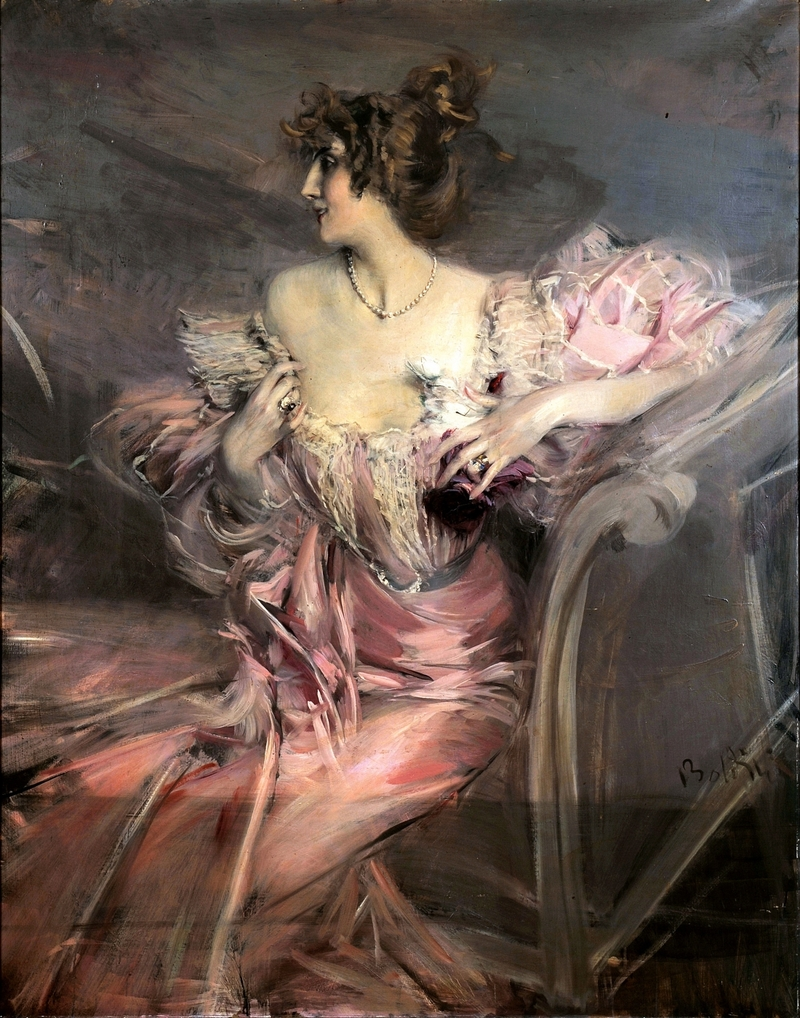
Portrait of Marthe de Florian by Giovanni Boldini

Gable began writing the novel in 2010 after her agent told her about a real-life apartment in Paris that had been locked up for 70 years. Although based on actual events, the story about the Sotheby's employee's involvement with the apartment is fictionalized. Prior to writing the novel, Gable spent four months researching the apartment, the time period, and the apartment's former owner, Marthe de Florian.

== Summary ==
The main plot of the novel revolves around April Vogt, a Sotheby's auctioneer who is tasked with assessing and selling rare antiques and collectibles found in an apartment in Paris that had been locked and unoccupied for the previous 70 years. The apartment is only opened after an heir to Marthe de Florian, the former owner, passes away.

The narrative alternates between modern day and the late 19th- and early 20th-centuries. The past storyline revolves around Marthe's diary entries while the present storyline follows April's quest to find the history behind the apartment's accoutrements. One particular item of interest for April is a portrait of Marthe painted by Giovanni Boldini. As a result of her research, April becomes increasingly fascinated with Marthe, Boldini, and the contents of the apartment. She also re-evaluates her position in a disappointing marriage and considers staying in Paris with a potential love interest.

== Historical figures ==
Throughout the novel, Vogt reads pages from de Florian's diaries that reference her life during the Belle Époque, including her friendships, rivalries, and romances with various historical figures including Jeanne Hugo, Léon Daudet, Jean-Baptiste Charcot, Robert de Montesquiou, and Duchess Sophie Charlotte in Bavaria.

== Reception ==
The book received generally favorable reviews. The blog, MomAdvice.com, called it a "fun summer historical fiction escape to Paris." The Historical Novel Society noted that it was a "charming read about a fascinating history and the woman behind it." The Library Journal called it a "stunning and fascinating debut [that] will capture the interest of a wide audience." The book became a New York Times bestseller in January 2016 and is a USA Today bestseller.
