= The First Sister =

2020 space opera novel by Linden A. Lewis

- Author: Linden Lewis
- Language: English
- Series: The First Sister Trilogy
- Genre: Science fiction; space opera
- Set in: Outer space; Ceres
- Publisher: Skybound Entertainment
- Publication date: 4 Aug 2020
- Pages: 352 (Hardcover)
- ISBN: 9781982126995
- Followed by: The Second Rebel

The First Sister is a 2020 space opera novel, the debut novel by Linden A. Lewis. It centers on conflict between the Icarii and the Geans, inhabitants of Mercury and Venus as well as Earth and Mars, respectively. It is the first novel in The First Sister Trilogy, and was followed by The Second Rebel in 2021 and The Last Hero in 2022.

== Plot ==
In the future, Mars and Earth form a military alliance called the Geans. Their state religion is led by the Mother. Women known as Sisters serve as priestesses and comfort women to soldiers; they are made mute so they cannot betray any soldier's secrets. Venus and Mercury have a government known as the Icarii, with advanced technology that they do not share with the Geans.

Lito sol Lucius is an Icarii warrior. His partner is Hiro val Akira. Hiro's father is a powerful and vindictive leader in the Icarii government. One year prior, the Icarii lost control of Ceres to the Geans. During the fighting, Lito and Hiro wounded Gean soldier Saito Ren. Ren was captured by the Icarii and later traded back to the Geans. After being assigned to kill the Mother, Hiro has gone dark. The Icarii tell Lito that they have defected.

Aboard the spacecraft Juno, the ship's First Sister is ordered to spy on new captain Saito Ren. Ren secretly wants peace with the Icarii, which makes her a traitor to the Geans. First Sister falls in love with Ren and decides to betray the Mother. The Juno lands on Ceres for a religious festival.

Lito is assigned a new partner, Ofiera fon Bain. They are ordered to kill both the Mother and Hiro. Lito learns that the Icarii are experimenting on Asters, genetically modified humans who live in the asteroid belt. Ofiera's husband is an Aster currently imprisoned by the Icarii. Hiro and Ofiera have secretly been working with the Asters; Lito decides to join them. He and Ofiera infiltrate Ceres and continue the plan to kill the Mother. They meet First Sister and “Ren”. It is revealed that Ren has been replaced by Hiro; they were surgically modified by the Icarii to resemble Ren and were forced to infiltrate the Geans.

First Sister learns that all Sisters are controlled by neural implants, and that she is suffering hallucinations as a result of a technical failure. With her implant disabled, she regains her voice. She assassinates the Mother and ascends to become the First Sister of Ceres. She blames the assassination on Saito Ren. In the chaos, Hiro, Lito, and Ofiera escape. Hiro vows revenge on their father, while Lito and Ofiera embark on a journey to save her husband.

== Major themes ==
The novel explores autonomy and consent through the Sisterhood and their forced sex work. The Sisters' voices are literally taken from them, rendering them free of agency; the First Sister even has no given name. Additionally, the Icarii's experimentation on the Asters is reminiscent of historical horrors such as the Tuskegee Syphilis Study and Project MKULTRA. The author stated that both The Handmaid's Tale and the Me Too movement served as inspirations for the ideas explored in the novel.

== Style ==
There are three major characters: Lito, First Sister, and Hiro. Hiro's point of view is presented as a long letter that they have sent to Lito, which is spliced in with Lito's chapters.

== Reception ==
The novel received moderately positive reviews. A writer for the American Library Association called the debut "casually queer in all of the best ways", praised its diverse characters and intentional worldbuilding, and stated "[it] delivers on every note". Publishers Weekly wrote that "Lewis skillfully handles the tale’s many moving pieces" and compared it positively to The Expanse by James S. A. Corey. A writer for NPR called it "stylish" and "substantial", praising the moral ambiguity in the Gean vs. Icarii conflict while feeling that the forced sexual slavery of the Sisterhood could have been explored further. Writing for Tor.com, Liz Bourke found the novel to be "enjoyable" but felt that the novel did not explore the moral consequences of the Sisterhood in enough depth. In a negative review for Locus, Katharine Coldiron found the character of First Sister to be "thinly written" and the plot twists to be "silly".

It was nominated for a Goodreads Choice Award for Best Science Fiction novel and Best Debut Novel.
