= Portrait of Robert de Montesquiou =

Painting by Giovanni Boldini

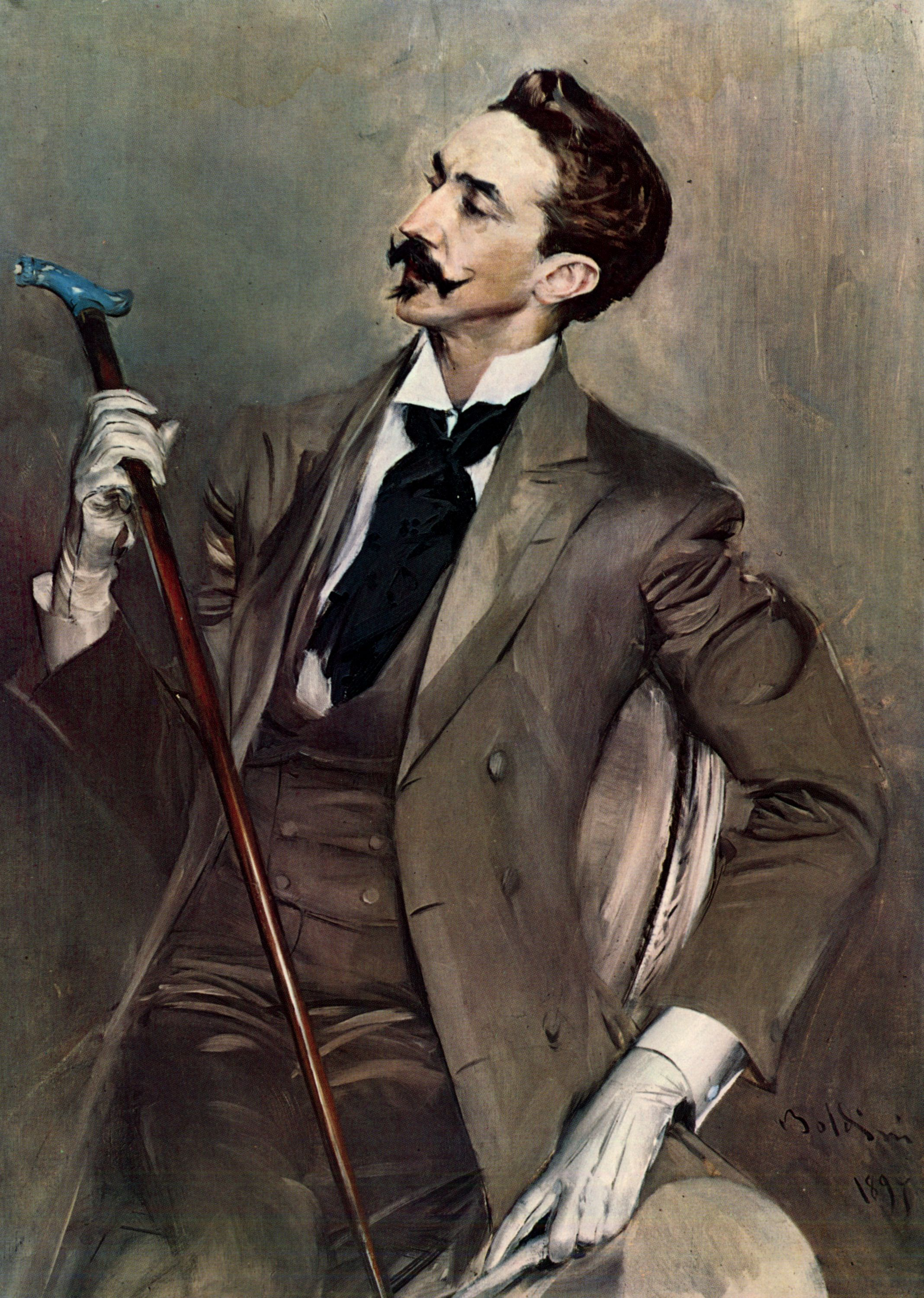
- Artist: Giovanni Boldini
- Year: 1897
- Medium: Oil on canvas
- Dimensions: 116 cm × 82.5 cm (46 in × 32.5 in)
- Location: Musée d'Orsay, Paris

The Portrait of Robert de Montesquiou is an oil on canvas painting by Italian painter Giovanni Boldini, from 1897. It is held at the Musée d'Orsay, in Paris.

== History ==
The painting depicts the count Robert de Montesquiou, a French poet famous for his elegance and eccentricity of his lifestyle. One of the leading names of the social life of Paris in the late 19th century, Montesquiou was an inimitable dandy and an enthusiastic supporter of the aesthetic ideas of John Ruskin and Walter Pater. In the world of Parisian elegance, he stood out for his refined sobriety of dress and his intolerance towards bourgeois mediocrity. He was homosexual, despite the fact that he also had relationships with women.

The commission for the Portrait of Robert de Montesquiou came to Boldini in 1897 from Olga Veil-Picard, a refined noblewomen in Paris. The work, completed in 1897, was exhibited at the Salon of 1897 staged by the Société Nationale des Beaux-Arts and immediately aroused the ardent admiration of Montesquiou.

== Description ==
The work, one of the pinnacles of Boldinian portraiture, almost seems to be the pictorial transposition of an introductory verse of a poem by Montesquiou, which read thus: "I am the sovereign of transitory things". Furthermore, the portrait faithfully respects the prescriptions of Montesquiou himself, who was firmly convinced that paintings should not pose too strictly the problem of a "photographic" reproduction of reality: the true purpose of a portrait, according to the poet was to focus on the psychological analysis of the character and the emotions that the artist himself wished to convey. This mix between the identity of the painter and that of the model, moreover, clearly shines in the present painting, where Boldini carried out a careful psychological introspection, depicting Montesquiou's peculiarities and expressing his own personal opinion on him.

Montesquiou's aestheticism finds in this painting one of its most vigorous and bursting expressive peaks. Mindful of the great portraiture of the masters of the 16th and 17th centuries, Boldini depicts an icon of the elegance of his time, and immortalizes Montesquiou while he is seated and stares at the blue handle of his walking stick. He is very elegantly dressed, wearing refined white chevreau gloves and a dove gray croisé costume. His fine clothing exudes a sense of sensuality. The poet seems to be concentrated exclusively on himself, without caring in the slightest about the viewer, and apparents an indifferent detachment, if not an inner boredom; with this acute character introspection Boldini outlines in Montesquiou the prototype of the decadent aesthete.

Boldini was certainly fascinated by the magnetic personality and elegance of Montesquiou, in whom he identified a modern incarnation of the Baudelairean dandy. A subtle irony, however, pervades the portrait, which as a whole almost seems to rebuke Montesquiou's personality. This is one of the best known male portraits by Boldini, who seems to have depicted Montesquiou similarly to a male equivalent of the glamorous female beauties of his time that he often portrayed.

== Provenance ==
The portrait was in the collection of Montesquiou until his death in 1921. The next year it was already in the Louvre. It is currently at the Musée d'Orsay, in Paris.
