= Michelle Gable =

American author based in San Diego

- Education: College of William & Mary (BBA)
- Occupation: Writer
- Writing career
- Notable work: A Paris Apartment
- Website: michellegable.com

Michelle Gable is an American author based in San Diego. She has published two novels, A Paris Apartment in 2014 and I'll See You in Paris in 2016, the former of which has appeared on The New York Times Best Seller list.

== Early life and career ==
Gable grew up in Del Mar, California, a beach city near San Diego. She developed an early interest in writing when her parents gave her a book entitled, Someday You'll Write. She attended Torrey Pines High School in San Diego. After high school, Gable attended and graduated from The College of William & Mary in 1996 with a BBA in Accounting. She went on to have a career in finance, eventually becoming the head of investor relations at the software company, Ellie Mae. She began writing at the age of 10 and at the age of 31 decided to try to get published. She spent several years working on what would become her first novel, A Paris Apartment.

== Writing career ==
In 2014, Gable released her first novel, A Paris Apartment. The book is based on a real-life apartment in Paris that had been locked for 70 years and contained a number of antiques, art pieces, and other items of interest, including a previously unknown Giovanni Boldini portrait. The novel is set in both the present day and the late 19th- and early 20th-centuries. The book was released in paperback in 2015 and first appeared on The New York Times Best Seller list in January 2016.

In February 2016, Gable released her second novel, I'll See You in Paris. She wrote the book by hand in the summer of 2014 while watching her daughter's softball games. The book focuses on Gladys Deacon, the Duchess of Marlborough in the late 19th century. Gable was inspired by Giovanni Boldini's portrait of Deacon. The story also connects modern-day narratives with the historical background.

=== Bibliography ===
Publication year	Title	Original publisher	ISBN	Notes
2014	A Paris Apartment	St. Martin's Press	ISBN 9781250067777	New York Times Bestseller
2016	I'll See You in Paris	Thomas Dunne Books	ISBN 9781250070630	
2017	The Book of Summer	Thomas Dunne Books	ISBN 9781250070623	
2018	The Summer I Met Jack	St. Martin's Press	ISBN 9781250103246	
