= Historical Novel Society =

Nonprofit international literary society

The Historical Novel Society (HNS) is a nonprofit international literary society devoted to promotion of and advocacy for the genre of historical fiction.

== Definition of historical fiction ==
There are varying definitions as to what types of literature fall within the scope of historical fiction. One of the broadest definitions of the genre is "fiction that is set in the past, before the author's lifetime and experience". The HNS has adopted this broader definition, accepting as historical fiction any novel written at least fifty years after the events described, or by an individual who was not alive at the time of those events, and thus approaches them from a research perspective. Alternate histories, time-slip novels, historical fantasies, and multiple-period novels (including novels where one of the time periods is contemporary) are all accepted by the HNS as historical fiction.

== History ==
Founded in 1997 in the United Kingdom by bookseller, editor, and historical novel enthusiast Richard Lee, the HNS's foundational membership included such authors as Joanna Trollope, Melvyn Bragg, and Bernard Cornwell. The first of many author events organized by the HNS was held in 1999 at Kirby Hall during the History in Action meeting, one of the largest historical re-enactment events in the world. That same year, the HNS launched its web presence. The society continued to grow in the UK, and also began to acquire members in the United States and throughout the world. Its first UK Historical Novel Society Conference was held at the New Cavendish Club in London, England in 2001; the first North American conference in 2005 in Salt Lake City, Utah; and the inaugural Australasian conference in Sydney, Australia, in 2015.

== Membership and organization ==
The HNS's membership is composed of historical fiction authors, readers, and others with an interest in the genre. Membership in the HNS is open to all, with the society's primary member base being composed of historical novelists and those who enjoy reading historical fiction. Though it is international in scope, the society also sponsors local chapters; there are currently 4 UK chapters, 11 US chapters, and 1 Australasian chapter. Through its local chapters and conferences, the HNS provides its members with networking opportunities to further a variety of goals related to historical fiction authorship as well as promotion of the genre in general. The HNS also has an active Facebook and Twitter presence.

== Publications ==
The HNS publishes a quarterly journal, the Historical Novels Review, which includes feature articles, author interviews, and columns related to historical fiction (e.g., "Historical Fiction Market News"). The journal also reviews approximately 300 new or forthcoming historical novels per issue, as well as selected nonfiction. When it was founded, the society published a magazine, Solander, which focused on features and interviews with historical novelists; initial contributors to the magazine included Richard Woodman and E.V. Thompson, amongst others. Solander merged with the Historical Novels Review in 2012. As of 2017, the 20th anniversary of both the society and the Historical Novels Review's first publication, the journal has published reviews of over 17,000 historical novels.

A subscription to the Historical Novels Review in printed format is included with society membership, along with online access to all its content. The HNS publishes additional features, interviews, and guides on its website, which are open to both members and non-members. The society also curates Historical Fiction Daily: A Web Magazine, which focuses and archives "the fascinating history and historical fiction stories that appear in the world's newspapers and blogs".

== Awards ==
In order to support writers of new historical fiction, the HNS offers two literary awards:

- New Novel Award. This award, which carries a prize of £2,000, is open to prospective authors of any nationality for a previously unpublished work of historical fiction.
- Short Story Award.

The awards are judged by eminent authors (e.g., Dame Hilary Mantel and Elizabeth Chadwick) and top industry professionals (e.g., the late Carole Blake, agent to Barbara Erskine, and Juliet Mushens agent to Jessie Burton). Past award winners who have gone on to publication include Michel Faber, Hilary Green, and Ruth Downie.

Anne Aylor won the Short Story Award in 2014 for "The House of Wild Beasts"; this and other winning and shortlisted stories were published in 2017 in the anthology Distant Echoes. Recent New Novel award winners include Martin Sutton for his novel, Lost Paradise, which subsequently received the Winston Graham Prize and Kelleigh Greenberg-Jephcott, who was offered a six-figure deal for publication of her work, Swan Song.

== Conferences ==
The HNS offers biennial conferences in the United Kingdom, the United States, and Australasia. These conferences feature networking opportunities, agent pitch sessions, writing workshops, editor sessions, programs for readers, panel presentations, and more. Past HNS conference presenters include prize-winning and best-selling authors Geraldine Brooks, Tracy Chevalier, Bernard Cornwell, Stephanie Dray, David Ebershoff, Kate Forsyth, Diana Gabaldon, Margaret George, C.W. Gortner, Phillip Margolin, Sharon Kay Penman, Anne Perry, Candace Robb, Harry Turtledove, and Susan Vreeland.
