= Susan Stokes-Chapman =

British writer of historical fiction

- Education: Aberystwyth University
- Website: www.susanstokeschapman.com

Susan Stokes-Chapman is a British author of historical fiction primarily set in the 18th and early 19th centuries that incorporates elements of Gothic fiction. Her debut novel Pandora (2022) became a #1 Sunday Times bestseller upon release. This was followed by The Shadow Key (2024) and a short story collection The Twelve Days of Christmas (2025).

== Early life ==
Stokes-Chapman grew up in Lichfield, Staffordshire. She graduated with a Bachelor of Arts (BA) in Education and English Literature and a Master of Arts (MA) in Creative Writing, both from Aberystwyth University.

== Career ==
Stokes-Chapman began her professional writing career in 2019, when she was accepted on Writing West Midlands' writer development programme, Room 204, having previously contributed to the organisation's Spark Young Writers initiative. She wrote a novel in her twenties titled Infelice, based on the essayist William Hazlitt and his obsession with a serving girl named Sarah Walker, which was developed from her MA dissertation. It won a Highly Commended commendation in the HWA & Sharpe Books Unpublished Novel Award in 2020.

In 2020 Stokes-Chapman's debut novel, Pandora, was shortlisted for the Lucy Cavendish Fiction Prize and longlisted for the Bath Novel Award, through which she secured her first book deal. In early 2021, Harvill acquired the rights to publish Pandora, which was released in January 2022. The novel is a loose reinterpretation of the Greek myth of Pandora's Box, set in Georgian London in 1799. It follows a young woman, Dora Blake, who lives with her uncle in an antique shop and uncovers a mysterious vase. Pandora debuted at number one on The Sunday Times hardback fiction bestseller list and was shortlisted for the 2023 Goldsboro Books Glass Bell Award.

Stokes-Chapman contributed a short story to the December 2023 Christmas-themed collection The Winter Spirits from Sphere Books. Another contribution followed in The Witching Hour (2025), also published by Sphere.

In May 2023, it was announced that Stokes-Chapman's sophomore novel The Shadow Key would be published by Harvill in April 2024. Set in 1783, the novel weaves together Welsh folklore and the occult, following London physician Henry Talbot as he moves to Penhelyg, a fictional coastal village in north-west Wales, after being hired following the death of the previous physician. In November 2023, Harvill acquired three further works from Stokes-Chapman: a short story collection, The Twelve Days of Christmas, and her third and fourth novels, The Constellations, set in 1765 Prague, and The Moth Farm, set in 19th-century Staffordshire.

== Bibliography ==
=== Novels ===
- Pandora (2022)
- The Shadow Key (2024)

=== Collections ===
- The Twelve Days of Christmas (2025)

=== Short stories ===
- "Widow's Walk" in The Winter Spirits: Ghostly Tales for Frosty Nights (2023)
- "A Midnight Visitor" in The Witching Hour: Ghostly Tales for the Darkest Nights (2025)
