= Stuart Turton =

English author

- Born: 1980 (age 45–46); Widnes, England
- Occupations: Author, journalist
- Writing career
- Years active: 2000–present
- Genres: Mystery fiction Crime fiction
- Website: stuturton.com

Stuart Turton (born 1980) is an English author and journalist. His first novel, The Seven Deaths of Evelyn Hardcastle (2018) was a bestseller internationally and won a number of awards including the 2018 Costa Book Award for First Novel. His most recent novel, The Last Murder at the End of the World, went to number one on the Sunday Times Bestseller list. His books have sold over one million copies in the US and UK.

== Early life ==
Turton was born and raised in Widnes, England and educated at University of Liverpool, where he received a BA (Hons) in English and Philosophy. After graduating, he spent a year working as a teacher in Shanghai, before becoming a technology journalist in London. He moved to Dubai to become a travel journalist, living there for three years until he returned to London to write his first novel.

== Career ==
=== The Seven Deaths of Evelyn Hardcastle ===
Turton's debut novel, The Seven Deaths of Evelyn Hardcastle (released in the US as The 7 1/2 Deaths of Evelyn Hardcastle) won the 2018 Costa Book Award for First Novel and has sold in 28 languages. Since publication, it has sold over 200,000 copies in the UK. In an interview given to The Guardian, he described writing the book as "just awful".

The Seven Deaths of Evelyn Hardcastle received a number of other accolades. It won Best Novel in the 2018 Books Are My Bag Readers' Awards. That same year, it was shortlisted for Debut Book of the Year at the Specsavers National Book Awards and longlisted for a New Blood Dagger and Gold Dagger at the Crime Writers' Association Awards.

Val McDermid selected Turton to appear on her New Blood panel at the Theakstons Old Peculier Crime Writing Festival. In 2019, it was shortlisted for Best Debut Novel at the Strand Magazine Critics Awards and longlisted for the Glass Bell Award. The Japanese edition of the novel, translated by Kazuyo Misumi and published in 2019, was shortlisted for the Best Translated Honkaku Mystery of the Decade (2010-2019).

=== The Devil and the Dark Water ===
Turton's second novel, The Devil and the Dark Water, was published in October 2020. It won the 2020 Books Are My Bag Fiction Award, and was shortlisted for the Ian Fleming Dagger at the Crime Writers' Association Awards. It was Waterstones Thriller of the Month, and selected for Between the Covers, a seven-part book TV programme on BBC Two hosted by Sara Cox. It has sold in 20 countries. The Japanese edition of the novel, translated by Kazuyo Misumi and published in 2022, was nominated for the 2023 Mystery Writers of Japan Award for Mystery Fiction in Translation.

=== Optioned for series ===
In December 2020 it was announced that Netflix had bought the rights to a seven-part series adaptation of The Seven Deaths of Evelyn Hardcastle, produced by BBC Studios-owned House Productions, and to be created and written by Sophie Petzal. But in January 2023 Netflix canceled its planned adaptation.

In April 2021, The Devil and the Dark Water was optioned for television by Urban Myth. It will be written by Howard Overman, with Turton serving as an executive producer on the project.

=== The Last Murder at the End of the World ===
In November 2020, Turton signed a contract to write two more "high-concept" mystery novels for Bloomsbury. The first of these, released in 2024, is called The Last Murder at the End of the World. He has described them as "nuts".

== Bibliography ==
=== Novels ===
- The Seven Deaths of Evelyn Hardcastle (2018)
- The Devil and the Dark Water (2020)
- The Last Murder at the End of the World (2024). ISBN 9781526665089.
