= Saara El-Arifi =

British author

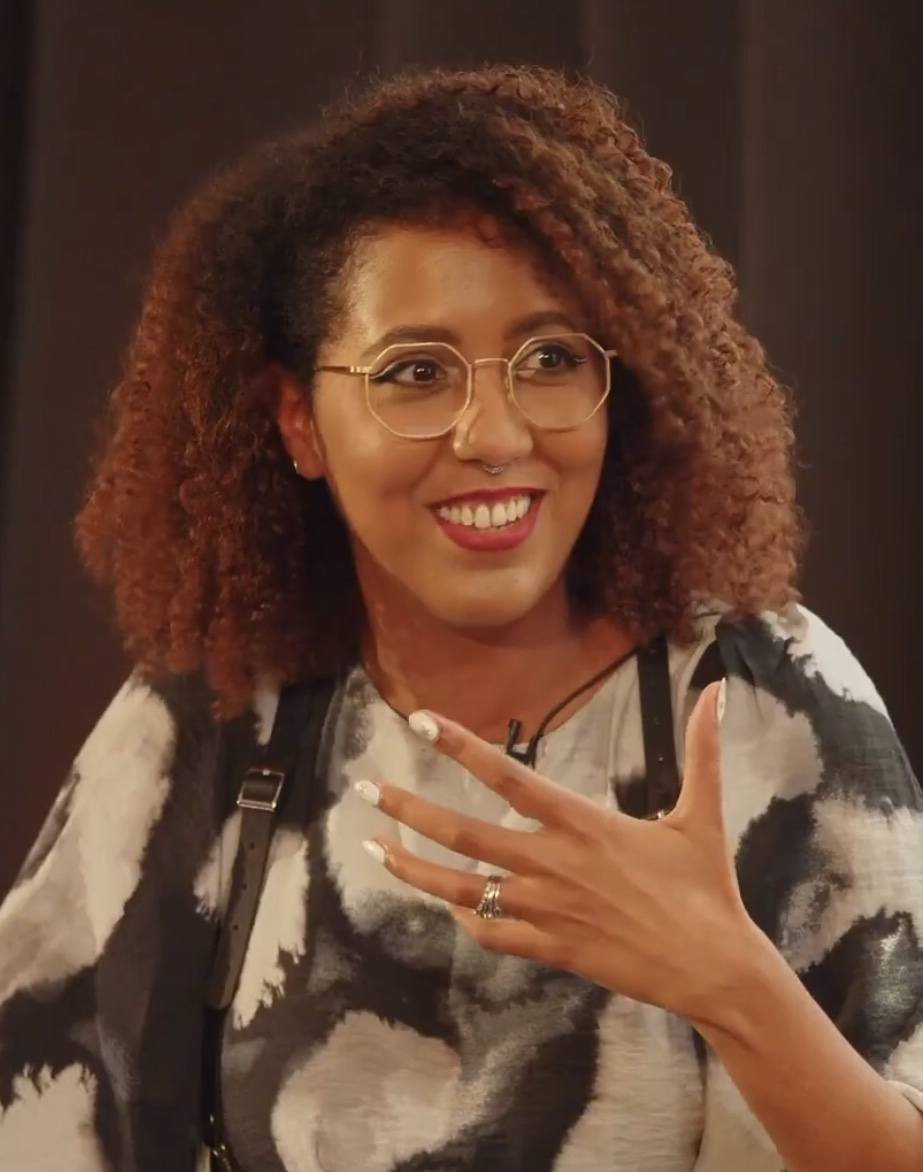
- El-Arifi at the British Library in 2023
- Born: Abu Dhabi, UAE
- Education: University of Kent (BA); SOAS University of London (MA)
- Years active: 2022–present
- Website: www.saaraelarifi.com

Saara El-Arifi is a British fantasy author. Her debut novel, The Final Strife, was published in 2022 by Del Rey Books in the United States and HarperVoyager in the United Kingdom. It is the first in the Ending Fire trilogy, which draws inspiration from West African and Arabian mythology, and was selected as one of Amazon's best books of 2022.

== Life and career ==
El-Arifi was raised in Abu Dhabi before relocating to Sheffield with her family. She is of Sudanese and Ghanaian descent. Her father was Muslim and her mother was raised Christian.

Her career as an author began in 2022 with the publication of The Final Strife, represented by Juliet Mushens of Mushens Entertainment. Faebound, the first in a new romantasy trilogy, was published in 2024 and became an instant #1 Sunday Times bestseller. The novel was also longlisted for the TikTok Awards UK & Ireland 2024. In 2023, rights to El-Arifi's next two projects, Cleopatra and The Queen of Sheba, were acquired by the Borough Press.

Cleopatra was published in February 2026 by Harper Collins and tells the story of Cleopatra VII, opening at the moment she discovers she is Pharaoh of Egypt.

El-Arifi holds a BA (Hons) in Theatre Studies from the University of Kent and an MA in African Studies from the SOAS University of London.

== Bibliography ==
=== The Ending Fire Trilogy ===
- The Final Strife (2022)
- The Battle Drum (2023)
- The Ending Fire (2024)

=== The Faebound Trilogy ===
- Faebound (2024)
- Cursebound (2025)
- Earthbound (2026)

=== Standalone ===
- Cleopatra (2026)
