= The Farm (Ramos novel) =

2019 novel by Joanne Ramos

- Author: Joanne Ramos
- Publisher: Random House
- Publication date: May 7, 2019
- Pages: 327
- ISBN: 9781984853752

The Farm is a 2019 novel by Filipino-American writer Joanne Ramos. The debut novel was published on May 7, 2019 by Random House. It is set in a fictional facility named Golden Oaks, also called "The Farm", where women serve as surrogates for wealthy clients. The novel switches between four perspectives of the women involved, including Jane Reyes, Evelyn "Ate" Arroyo, Reagan McCarthy, and Mae Yu.

== Writing ==
The idea for the novel struck Ramos when she came across a magazine advert for surrogacy services in India. The characters in the book were partly inspired by the many Filipina domestic workers she met who shared her ethnic background but lacked the opportunities she herself had. Ramos said that she chose to switch narrators throughout the novel because "otherwise it was one person’s perspective and one view. I wanted to question the society we’ve collectively chosen". The book has been widely compared to Margaret Atwood's The Handmaid's Tale. She has stated that she did not consider the novel a dystopia but rather a story set "where we are today, but pushed forward just a few inches".

== Plot ==
Jane Reyes is a Filipino domestic worker and single mother living in a dormitory in New York, with her infant daughter Amalia. When Jane loses her job as a baby nurse, her elderly cousin Evelyn Arroyo, whom she refers to as "Ate," convinces her to join Golden Oaks. Golden Oaks is a commercial facility that uses women, called “hosts”, as surrogates for wealthy clients for handsome bonuses. Jane moves in to the Golden Oaks’ residence, begrudgingly leaving behind Amalia in Evelyn’s care. Once there, she befriends other Hosts like Reagan McCarthy, a white college-graduate who agrees to be a Host to achieve a sense of meaning in her life, and Lisa Raines, a 3rd-time Host who is increasingly disillusioned with Golden Oaks.

As months pass, Jane becomes increasingly worried about Amalia’s well-being as Evelyn does not return her calls. Moreover, she gets into trouble with Mae Yu, Golden Oak’s executive manager, resulting in a cancellation of Jane’s scheduled visit with Amalia. Jane is also betrayed to learn that Evelyn had received a commission for recommending Golden Oaks to Jane. Meanwhile, Reagan is angered by the fact that they used an actor to pretend to be Reagan’s client in order to give her a false sense of purpose. Lisa and Reagan help Jane escape the residence, and Jane rushes to find Amalia. She is directed to a nearby hospital, where she finds that it is not Amalia but Evelyn who is critically ill. On returning to her dorm, she finds Mae there, as she had correctly guessed that she would return. Mae cancels Jane’s sizable bonus but, feeling sorry for her, hires her to be a Host for Mae’s own child. The epilogue cuts to about three years later, where Jane is a nanny to Mae’s son, Victor. Evelyn has died, and Jane and Amalia live above Mae’s house. Reagan, meanwhile, is still good friends with Jane and is getting her Master's degree.

== Themes ==
The novel examines motherhood within an intricate web of class, gender and race. Its characters articulate both sides of the surrogacy argument: one, that it is commodification of women, and the other, that it is an act of benevolence. Ramos herself states that she is not against surrogacy but questioned "how far we’ve pushed so many things into the realm of markets". The novel examines how feminism works differently across class lines: Clients are extremely wealthy, successful women, while the Hosts are largely financially weak women of color. The novel also dwells on how some women “choose” to take on the task of childbearing because it is their best option for survival in capitalist America. Additionally, the novel re-examines the idea of the American Dream and how success in America also depends on happenstance and luck, which many immigrants never experience.

== Reception ==
The novel was nominated for an NAACP Image Award for Outstanding Literary Work – Debut Author, as well as long-listed for the Center for Fiction’s First Novel Prize. It was chosen as a "must-read novel" by various publications such as O, The Oprah Magazine, The Wall Street Journal, and New York Magazine.

Time Magazine wrote that "At first glance, Joanne Ramos’ The Farm may seem like a predictable thriller about pregnancy...But instead of relying on easy villains in a story that quickly turns sinister, Ramos turns to three of the issues that divide America: race, class and immigration. Nuanced characters and a fast-paced narrative elevate a story that might otherwise feel weighed down by its themes." Similarly, The New Yorker wrote: "For a novel about the ruthlessness of capitalism, Ramos demonstrates remarkable tenderness for her characters." NPR wrote that "the novel's complex mélange of personalities brings a somewhat improbable story stirringly to life". Dina Nayeri of The Guardian wrote that Ramos "has the acute gaze of the immigrant girl made good. Her book is a necessary one – we need a mass-market novel that shows the impact of colonisation, with flawed white people failing to save the day." The New York Times called it "an 'issue' book, but it wears the mantle lightly. It's a breezy novel full of types (the Shark, the Dreamer, the Rebel, the Saint), and veers, not always successfully, from earnestness into satire. That shift in voice can obscure the novel's intent — though to be fair, ambiguity may be the point." Los Angeles Review of Books criticized the ending as "too easy and ultimately unsatisfying" but praised Ramos' "ability to explore the nuances of these questions in the first place — in tight, spare prose, with well-placed plotting, no less".
