= Christina Dalcher =

American writer

- Occupations: Writer, linguist
- Writing career
- Language: English

Christina Dalcher is an American writer and doctor of linguistics. She became known for her first novel Vox and is recognized for her dystopian novels.

== Biography ==
Dalcher grew up in New Jersey and studied at Georgetown University. From 2006 to 2009, she lived in Clerkenwell and worked as a researcher at City, University of London. She then moved to Abu Dhabi for three years and spent several months in Sri Lanka with her husband, Bruce, a lawyer specializing in maritime law. She lives in Norfolk, Virginia.

Dalcher turned to writing at almost 50 years old. Her first work, the dystopian novel Vox, was published four years later, in 2018. Two years later, she published the novel Master Class, followed by Femlandia.

== Works ==
Dalcher published her first novel, Vox, in 2018. She had never tried her hand at literature before, and, to write her first work, she was inspired by several dystopian novels: Nineteen Eighty-Four by George Orwell, which Dalcher first read in 1984, while in high school and has reread frequently since; Fahrenheit 451 by Ray Bradbury; and The Handmaid's Tale by Margaret Atwood, which she read in the mid-1980s when it had just been published. According to her, the common thread of these three novels is the danger represented by a state that is too present in the lives of citizens.

== Bibliography ==
- Vox, 2018 ISBN 9780440000815
- Master Class, 2020 (published in the UK as Q) ISBN 9780440000846
- Femlandia, 2021 ISBN 9780593201121
- The Sentence, 2024
