= Linden A. Lewis =

Speculative fiction author

- Occupation: Writer
- Writing career
- Language: English
- Genre: Science fiction
- Notable work: The First Sister

Linden A. Lewis is an American science fiction author, best known for their debut novel The First Sister. Lewis is queer and uses she/they pronouns.

== Biography ==
As of 2020, Lewis lives in Madrid.

== Literary career ==
Lewis has been writing "since I can remember" and decided to draft a novel for the first time in college. They consider Margaret Atwood, Leigh Bardugo, and R.F. Kuang to be their literary inspirations.

Lewis's debut novel The First Sister was published in 2020 by Skybound Entertainment. It received moderately positive critical response. It was nominated for a Goodreads Choice Award for Best Science Fiction novel and Best Debut Novel.

== Work ==
The First Sister Trilogy

- The First Sister, Skybound Entertainment, 2020, ISBN 9781982126995
- The Second Rebel, Skybound Entertainment, 2021, ISBN 9781982127022
- The Last Hero, Skybound Entertainment, 2022, ISBN 9781982127077
