= The Devil and the Dark Water =

2020 novel by Stuart Turton

- Author: Stuart Turton
- Cover artist: David Mann
- Language: English
- Genre: Historical fiction, horror fiction, murder mystery
- Set in: 1634, Batavia, Dutch East Indies
- Publication date: 1 Oct 2020
- Publication place: United Kingdom
- Pages: 480 (hardcover)
- ISBN: 978-1-72820-602-8
- LC Class: PR6120.U79 D48

The Devil and the Dark Water is a 2020 genre-bending novel by Stuart Turton, combining elements of historical fiction, murder mystery, and horror. Set in 1634, it features a detective trying to solve a series of inexplicable crimes aboard an East Indiaman ship.

== Plot ==
In 1634, investigator Samuel Pipps of the Dutch East India Company is arrested in Batavia. Pipps and his sidekick Arent Hayes are set to be transported back to Amsterdam aboard the Saardam. Other members of the voyage include governor-general Jan Haan (the uncle of Arent Hayes), his wife Sara, his mistress Creesjie, Predikant Sander Kers, and several nobles. Sara plans to leave her abusive husband upon reaching Amsterdam. As they are all boarding the ship, a leper prophesies that the ship will not reach its destination. The leper then bursts into flames.

As a child, Arent and his father went into the woods to hunt. Arent’s father disappeared and Arent was found with a strange symbol carved into his skin. Arent started painting the symbol on villager’s doors. This inadvertently sparked a moral panic, leading villagers to beat a man named Old Tom to death. Creesjie’s late husband, Pieter, was a witch hunter who believed that a demon called Old Tom was behind the symbol. He accused noble families of witchcraft, leading to the downfall of several noble houses and his own personal enrichment. In particular, the de Haviland family was attacked by a mob and their manor was burned down. Four years prior to the story, Pieter’s corpse was found with the symbol carved into the wall next to his body.

Predikant Sander Kers is the last member of Pieter’s order of witch hunters. Kers believes Old Tom is possessing one of the ship’s passengers. Sara eavesdrops on her husband. The conversation implies that he originally summoned Old Tom and killed Arent’s father. Arent confronts Haan. Haan admits that he orchestrated Arent’s father’s death, but claims it was to protect Arent from child abuse.

The ship’s animals are slaughtered; passengers begin hearing a voice which offers them their greatest desires in exchange for killing Haan. Sander Kers goes missing; his body is later found stuffed into a hidden compartment. Creesjie finds Haan stabbed to death inside his locked bedchamber, a dagger still in his chest. Sara discovers that a noblewoman named Emily de Haviland has been traveling with them under an assumed name. Chaos erupts on the ship as crew members fight with soldiers; the captain is killed and the ship runs aground onto an island.

Sara and Arent uncover the secret of Haan’s death: he was killed by stabbing him with an extremely long blade through a hole in his roof; the dagger in his chest was placed into the wound as a diversion. Creesjie reveals that she is really Emily de Haviland and Pipps is her brother Hugo. They sought revenge against those who caused the downfall of their family, staging a haunting on the ship in order to explain the deaths. Arent, Sara, Creesjie, and Pipps agree to use the Old Tom legend for good. They agree to work together to get revenge against powerful people whose wealth would allow them to evade consequences, blaming their deaths on the demon.

== Major themes ==
According to a review for The Nerd Daily, the novel explores feminist themes through Sara and her daughter Lia, who constantly push for equality for female characters.

== Style ==
According to a review in The Guardian, The Devil and the Dark Water pays homage to the use of tropes in contemporary entertainment. Turton references cases that Pipps and Arent have previously solved, as though they have been previously explored in prequel novels. Characters "often talk as if they know they're in a book".

Old Tom's symbol is a MacGuffin.

== Reception ==
Publishers Weekly gave the book a starred review, calling it an "outstanding whodunnit" and praising the "brilliant resolution of the plot". Kirkus gave the novel a starred review, writing that it is "a devilish sea saga that never runs out of cutthroat conspiracies". Writing for Bookreporter.com, Rebecca Munro positively compared the novel to a "Sherlock Holmes mystery populated by characters from an Agatha Christie novel and set inside a game of Clue". Munro praised the author's plotting as well as the well-described motivations and inner thoughts of the major characters. A review for The Guardian by M. John Harrison praised the fast pace and the number of surprises, calling it "irresistible". A review in the New York Times called the novel "compulsively readable" and "slightly over-the-top".
