= Kelleigh Greenberg-Jephcott =

American author

Kelleigh Greenberg-Jephcott is an American author. Her debut novel, Swan Song (2018), was longlisted for the Women's Prize for Fiction and won the McKitterick Prize. It was also named one of The Sunday Times Paperbacks of the Year and was shortlisted for the Goldsboro Books Glass Bell Award.

== Early life and education ==
Kelleigh Greenberg-Jephcott was born and raised in Houston, Texas, and later lived in Los Angeles and London. She holds a Bachelor of Fine Arts Drama (Directing) from Carnegie Mellon University and studied screenwriting at the University of Southern California. She obtained her M.A. through the UEA Creative Writing Course and later won the Bridport Arts Centre Prize Peggy Chapman-Andrews Award.

== Personal life ==
Kelleigh Greenberg-Jephcott is married to the RADA-trained English actor and writer Dominic Jephcott.
