= The Final Strife =

2022 novel by Saara El-Arifi

- First edition cover art (USA)
- Author: Saara El-Arifi
- Language: English
- Release number: 1
- Genre: Fantasy
- Publisher: HarperVoyager (UK); Del Rey Books (US)
- Publication date: 21 May 2022
- Publication place: United States
- Pages: 608 (first edition)
- ISBN: 9780593356944

The Final Strife is a novel written by Sudanese-Arab-Ghanaian-British author Saara El-Arifi. It was published in 2021 by Del Rey Books in the United States and HarperVoyager in the United Kingdom. It is the first novel in a trilogy named The Ending Fire.

== Synopsis ==
=== Premise ===
Hundreds of years ago, most of the world was destroyed by the Ending Fire. The only remaining land is an island governed by the Wardens’ Empire. The Empire is ruled by four Wardens; their seconds-in-command are the four Disciples.

The Empire is divided into classes based on blood color. Embers, the nobility, have red blood. They can use their blood to write runes, giving them power over the other classes. Dusters have blue blood, while Ghostings have transparent blood. Ghostings are the lowest-ranking class; they are mutilated by Embers as children, having their tongues and hands removed.

Eighteen years before the time when the story is set, twelve Ember children were kidnapped from the Wardens’ Keep as part of the Sandstorm rebellion; these children are known as the Stolen.

=== Plot summary ===
Sylah is one of the last surviving Stolen children. When she was fourteen, she accidentally scraped her knee. Her red blood revealed her identity, and most of the Stolen were killed. As an adult, she pretends to be a Duster and is addicted to joba seeds, a psychoactive drug. Her friend Jond, the final surviving Stolen, returns after several years.

Sylah sneaks into the Keep and meets Anoor, the girl with whom she was switched as a child. Sylah agrees to train Anoor for the Aktibar, a series of ritualized trials to select the next Disciples. In exchange, Anoor teaches Sylah bloodwerk runes. Sylah makes a deal with the crime lord Loot; he gives her a bloodwerk device in exchange for a future favor.

As Anoor progresses through the six Aktibar trials, her relationship with Sylah becomes more friendly. Together, they steal journals from the Wardens and realize that the Empire is not the only remaining land, and the story of the Ending Fire is a lie. Sylah eventually rejects Jond and the Sandstorm in favor of Anoor. Loot reveals himself as the new leader of the Sandstorm and asks Sylah to kill Anoor. Sylah confesses everything to Anoor, including her true identity.

Hassa, a Ghosting servant and friend to Sylah, has been helping Ghostings escape the Empire. Hassa reveals that the Ghostings were the original inhabitants of the Empire's land. Ghostings and Dusters can also bloodwerk, but this knowledge has been suppressed by the ruling Embers. She offers to help Sylah and Anoor escape to the mainland. Anoor refuses to leave without finishing the Aktibar: a fight to first blood against Jond. Sylah drugs Anoor, then puts on Anoor's armor and bests Jond. Anoor becomes the next Disciple of Strength. She instructs Sylah to go to the mainland with Hassa and the other Ghostings. Sylah is intercepted by Loot and Jond. She decapitates Loot in a fight and sees that his blood runs yellow. She captures Jond and continues her journey.

== Reception ==
A review for Publishers Weekly called the novel "a fast-paced epic fantasy inspired by Ghanian and Arabian folklore." The review stated that "El-Arifi keeps the pages flying even while building an intricate secondary world, allowing readers to learn its rules through action rather than exposition. This sets a high bar for the series to come."

Kirkus gave the novel a starred review, commenting particularly on the novel's concept of discrimination based on blood color. This review stated that "The concept of people having different blood colors seems implausible ... but then, this is the same genre in which enormous dragons fly and breathe fire in sheer defiance of physics." Kirkus clarified that "[r]acism based on blood color also leads to some interesting possibilities for “passing,” which the author exploits to their fullest extent. The message is hardly subtle, but our current climate does not support much subtlety, and this blunt allegory ... is crafted into a compelling story with sympathetic characters."

The publishing rights to The Final Strife were purchased in the UK and Commonwealth (excluding Canada) by HarperVoyager after a five-way auction. The publishing rights in the United States were purchased in a six-figure pre-empt. The novel was named one of Amazon's best books of 2022.
