= Giovanni Boldini =

Italian painter (1842–1931)

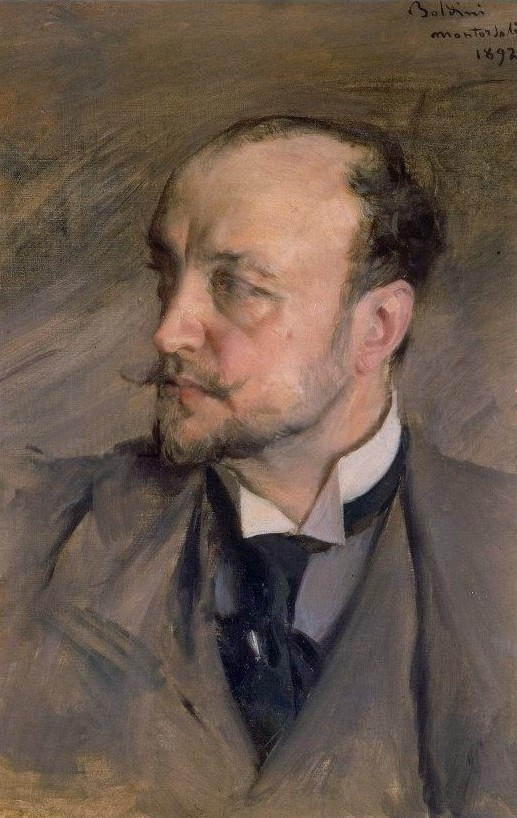
- Self-Portrait at Montorsoli, 1892
- Born: 31 December 1842; Ferrara, Papal States
- Died: 11 January 1931 (aged 88); Paris, France
- Education: Academy of Fine Arts of Florence
- Known for: Painting
- Movement: Macchiaioli
- Awards: Legion of Honour
- Patrons: Diego Martelli, Goupil & Cie

Signature
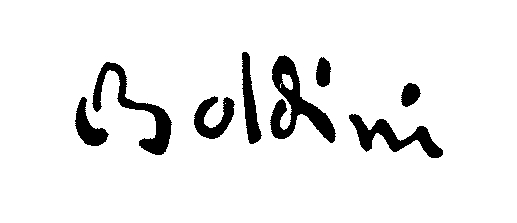

Giovanni Boldini (31 December 1842 – 11 January 1931) was an Italian genre and portrait painter who lived and worked in Paris for most of his career. According to a 1933 article in Time magazine, he was known as the "Master of Swish" because of his flowing style of painting.

== Early life ==
Boldini was born in Ferrara, Italy on 31 December 1842. He was the son of a painter of religious subjects, and the younger brother of architect Luigi (Louis) Boldini. In 1862, he went to Florence for six years to study and pursue painting. He only infrequently attended classes at the Academy of Fine Arts, but in Florence, met other realist painters known as the Macchiaioli, who were Italian precursors to Impressionism. Their influence is seen in Boldini's landscapes which show his spontaneous response to nature, although it is for his portraits that he became best known.

== Career ==
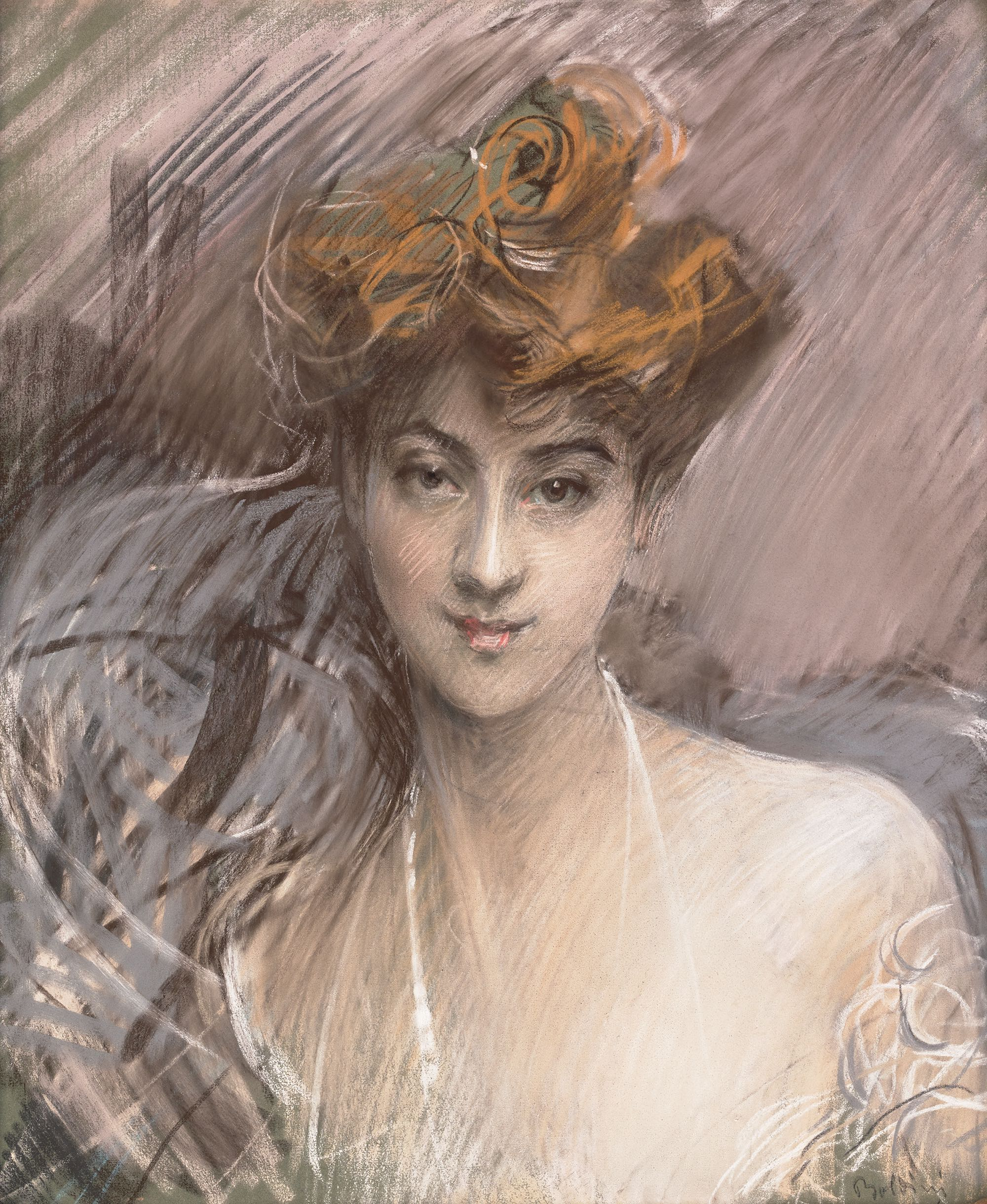
Giovanni Boldini, Portrait of Lucie Gérard, c. 1890. Pastel on canvas.

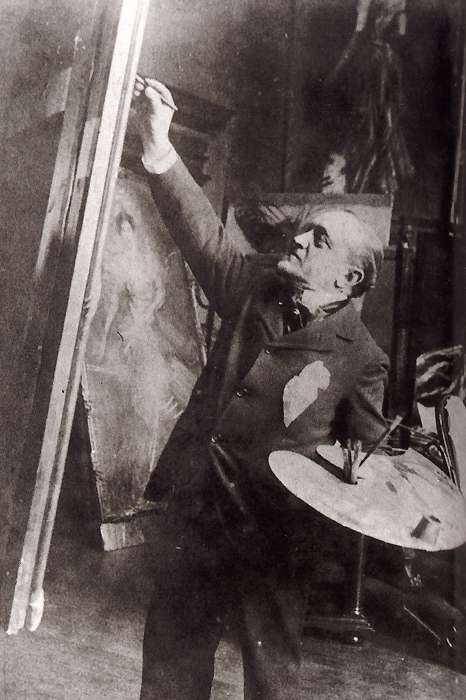
Photograph of Boldini in his atelier, by Alice Guérin, c. 1925

Moving to London, Boldini attained success as a portraitist. He completed portraits of distinguished members of society including Lady Holland and the Duchess of Westminster. From 1872 he lived in Paris, where he became a friend of Edgar Degas. He also had a romantic relationship with a French woman named Berthe, who would be a regular model for him in the same decade. He had another lover in the Countess Gabrielle de Rasty. He became the most fashionable portrait painter in Paris in the late 19th century, with a dashing style of painting which shows some Macchiaioli influence and a brio reminiscent of the work of younger artists, such as John Singer Sargent and Paul Helleu.

He was nominated commissioner of the Italian section of the Paris Exposition in 1889, and received the Légion d'honneur for this appointment. In 1897 he had a solo exhibition in New York. He participated in the Venice Biennale in 1895, 1903, 1905, and 1912.

Boldini died in Paris on 11 January 1931. In a write up in The New York Times in January 1931, his career was summed up as follows:

Boldini was a fashionable portrait painter. He 'did' all the grandes dames of Paris, and at a certain period to have a portrait painted by Boldini was a crowning event of the social season. His style was racy and advanced for his time, and he believed that his décolleté paintings touched the extreme limit of convention. His work was the talk of numerous salons. And then he was superseded by Vandongens and Etcheverrys and Domergues and others whose daring shocked and discouraged Boldini. He had not painted for many years before his death. His body was taken to Ferrara, his native city, for burial.

After his death, his work continued to be exhibited around the world. An exhibition of his work was held in 1938, seven years after his death, at the Newhouse Galleries in New York City. In 2022, the Petit Palais in Paris presented a major retrospective of Boldini’s work, titled Giovanni Boldini. Les plaisirs et les jours.

=== Works ===
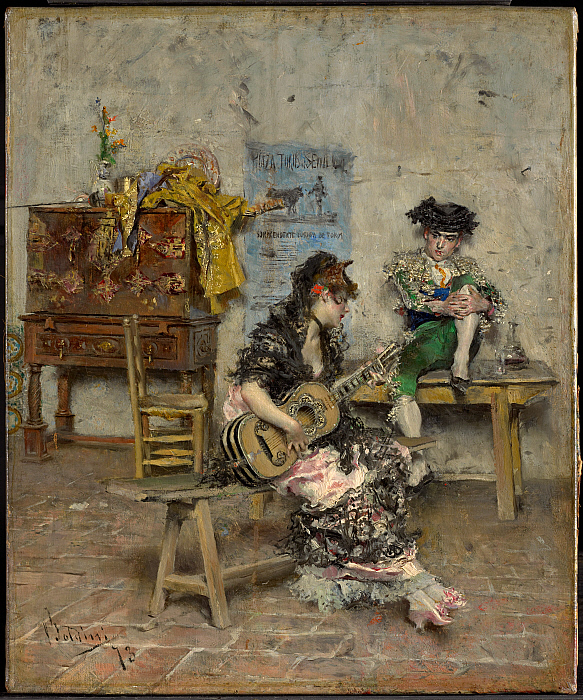
Guitar Player (1872), Oil on canvas, 16 3/8 × 13 9/16 in. (41.6 × 34.4 cm), Clark Art Institute

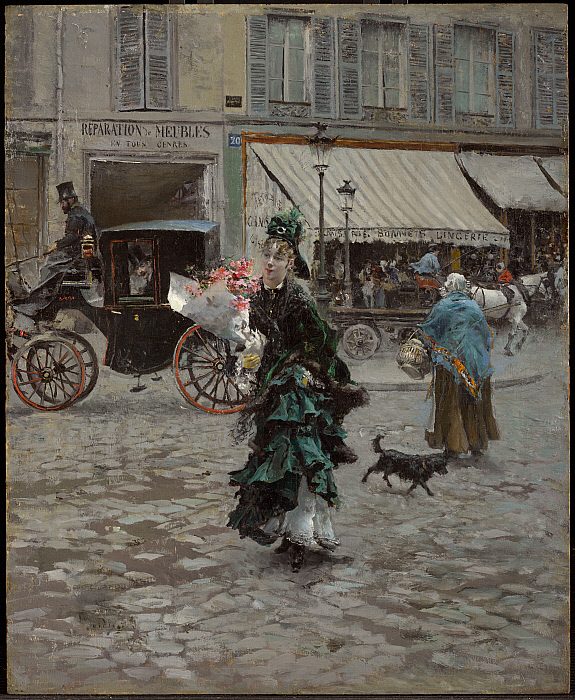
Crossing the Street (1873–75), Oil on panel, 18 3/16 × 14 7/8 in. (46.2 × 37.8 cm), Clark Art Institute

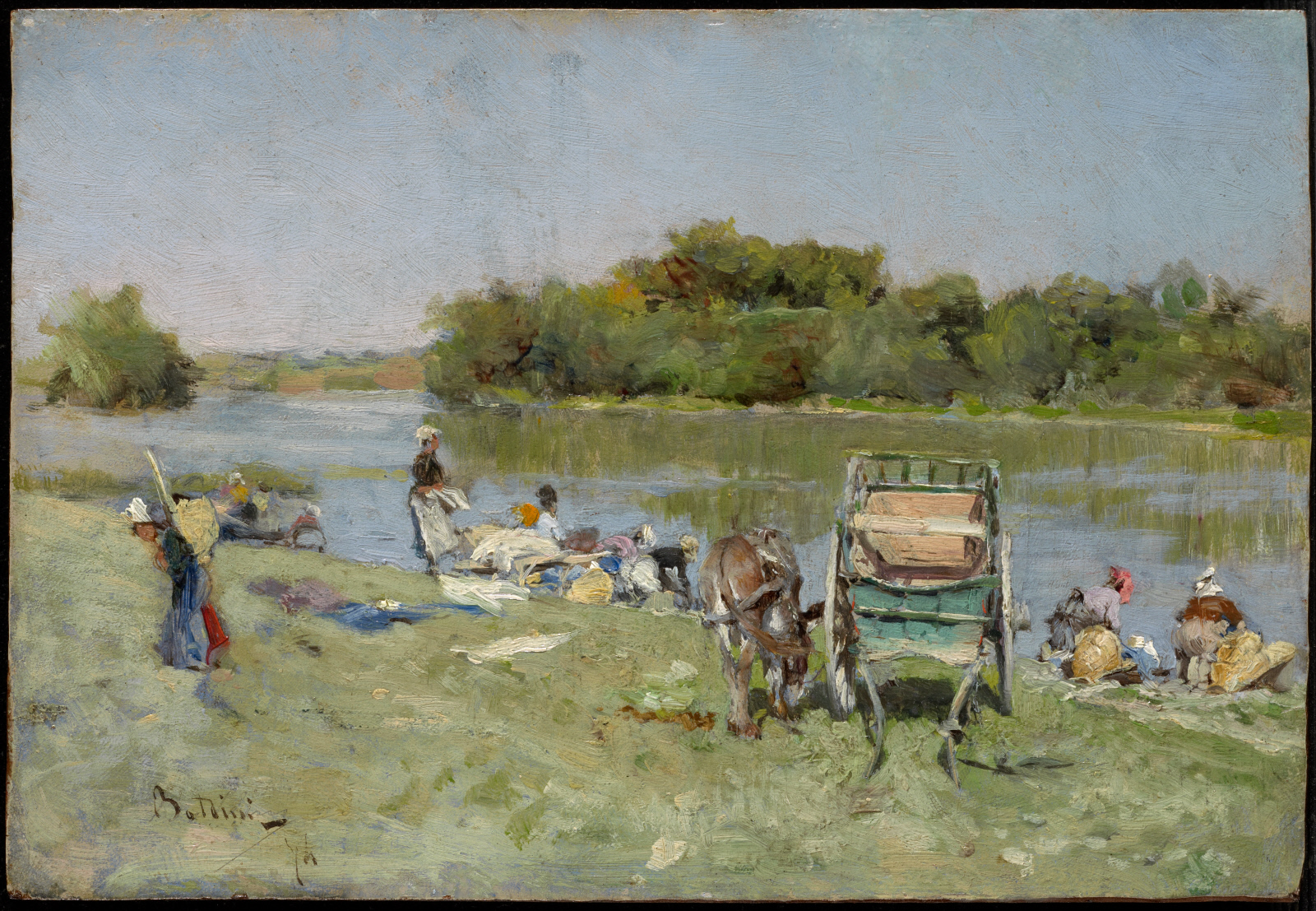
Washerwomen (1874), Oil on panel, 5 3/8 x 7 7/8 in. (13.7 x 20 cm), Clark Art Institute

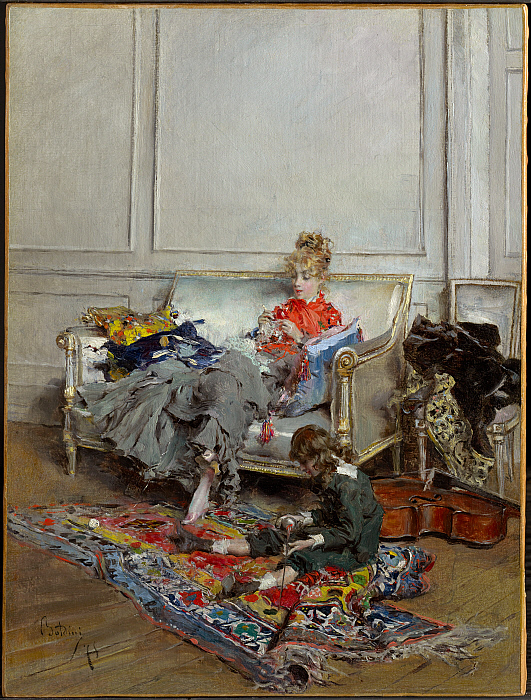
Young Woman Crocheting (1875), Oil on canvas, 14 1/4 × 10 13/16 in. (36.2 × 27.4 cm) Clark Art Institute

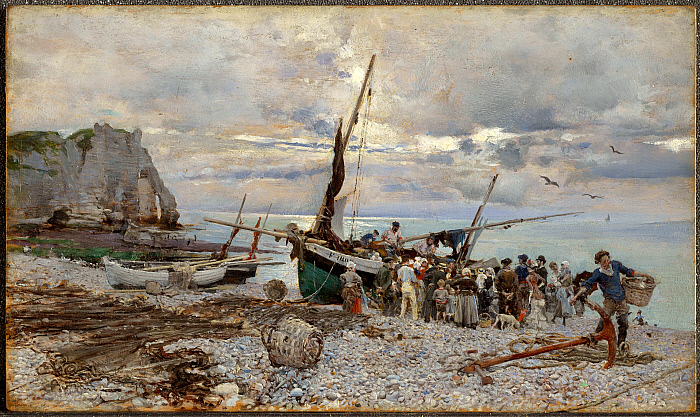
Return of the Fishing Boats, Étretat (1879), Oil on panel, 5 1/2 × 9 7/16 in. (14 × 23.9 cm), Clark Art Institute

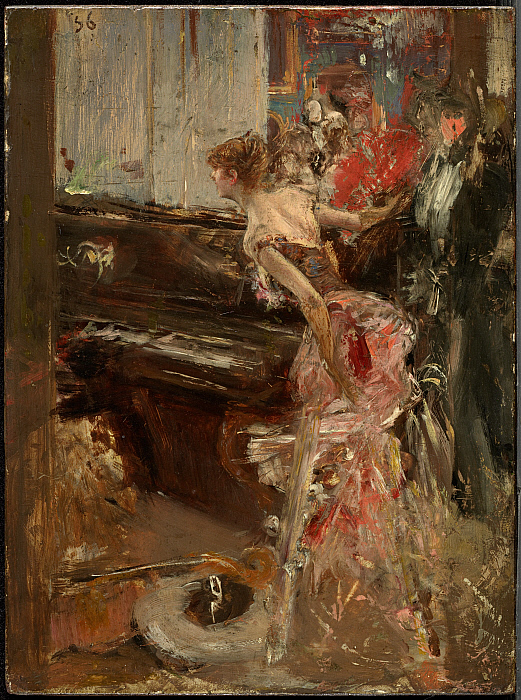
Recital (c.1884), Oil on panel, 8 11/16 x 6 7/16 in. (22 x 16.4 cm), Clark Art Institute

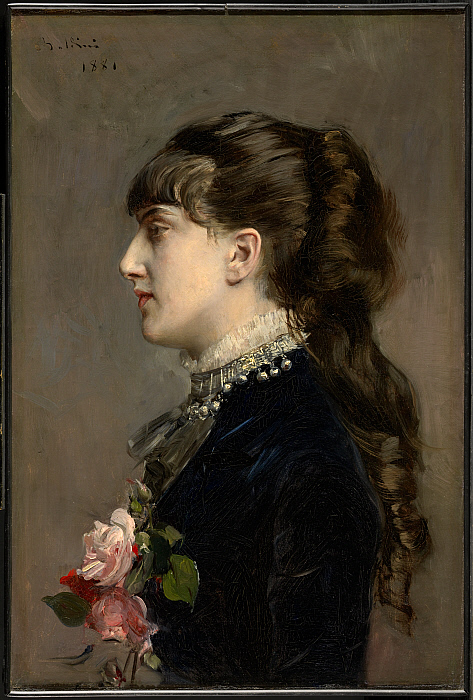
Madame Céline Leclanché (1881), Oil on canvas, 24 x 16 1/8 in. (61 x 41 cm) Clark Art Institute

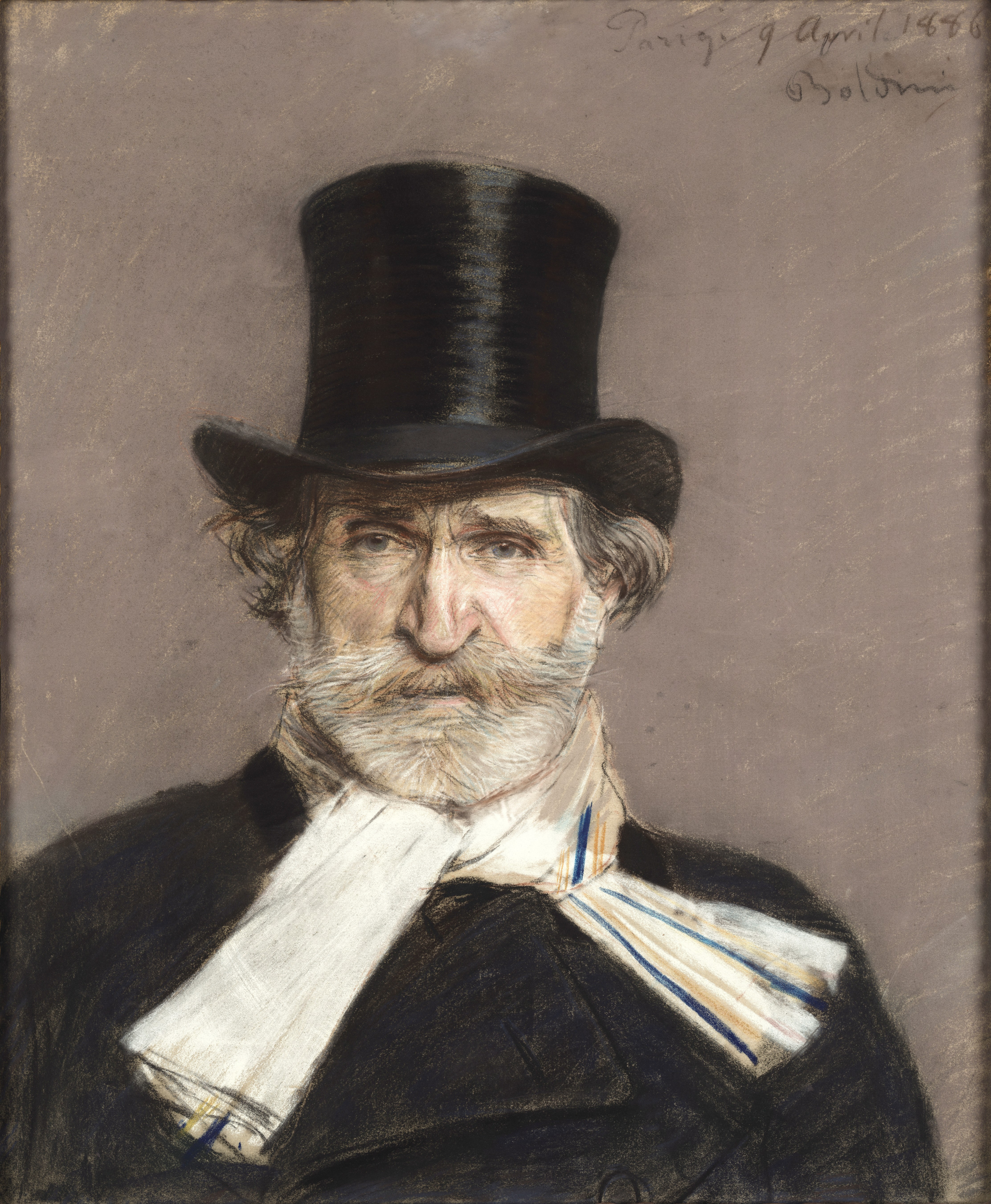
Portrait of Giuseppe Verdi, 1886

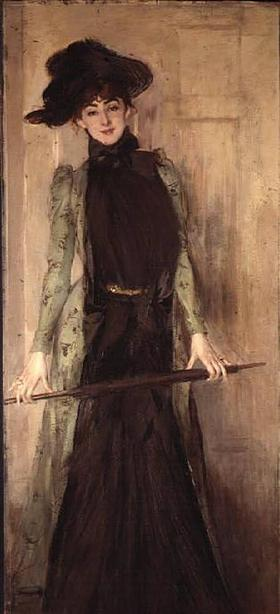
Then-princess Clara Ward, 1889

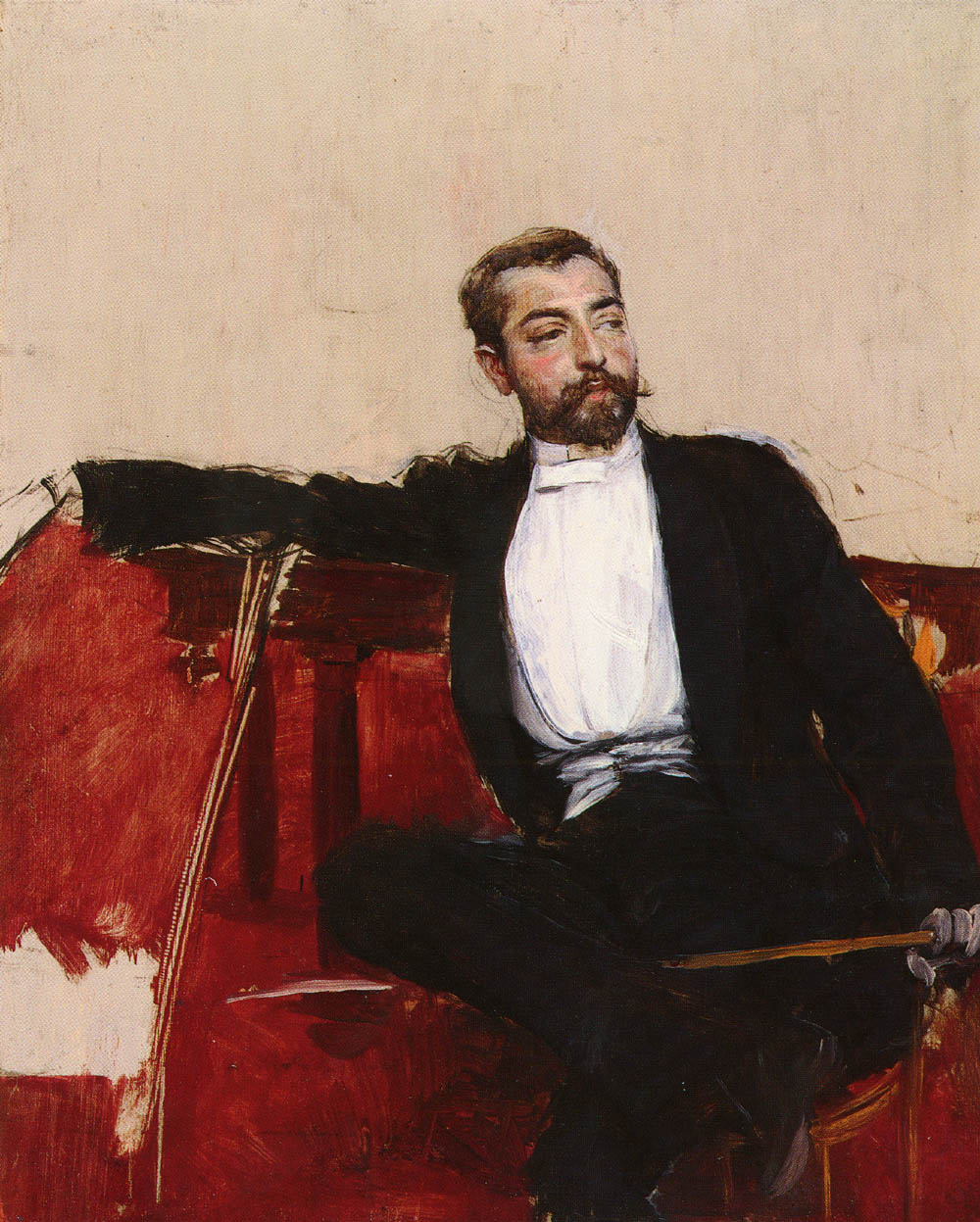
Portrait of John Singer Sargent, c. 1890

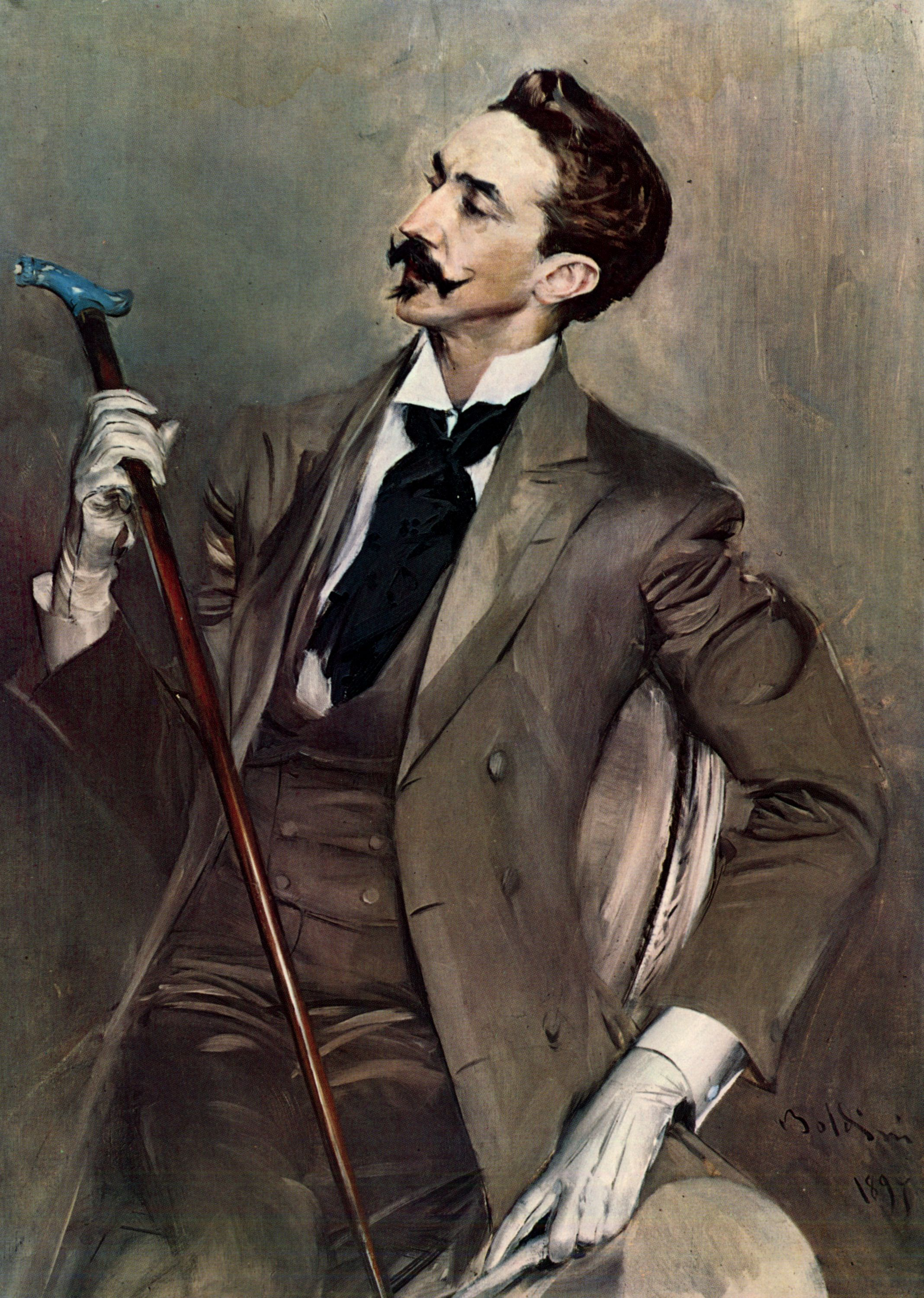
Portrait of Robert de Montesquiou, 1897

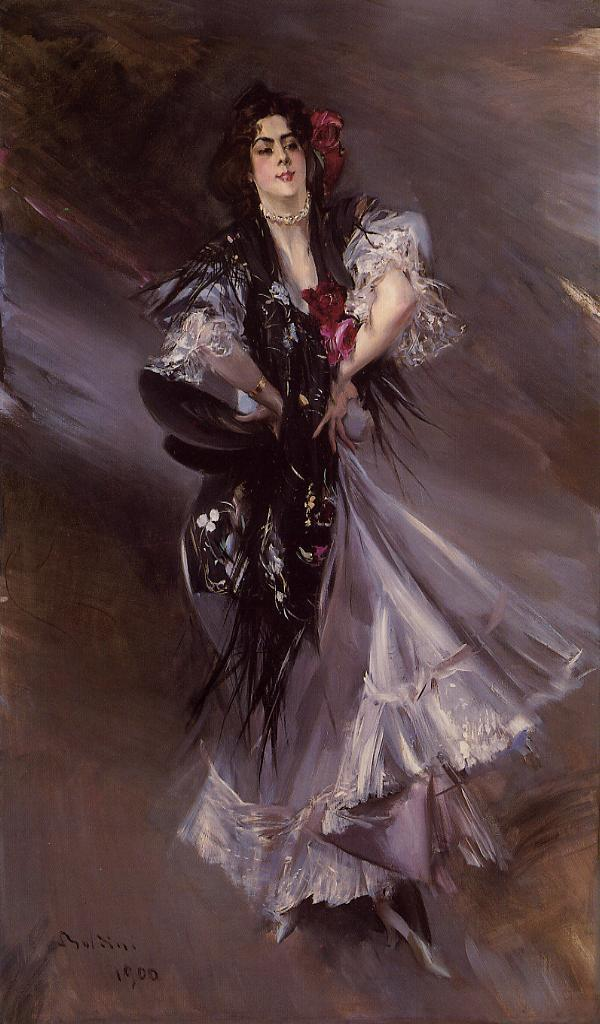
Portrait of Anita de la Ferie (the Spanish Dancer), 1900

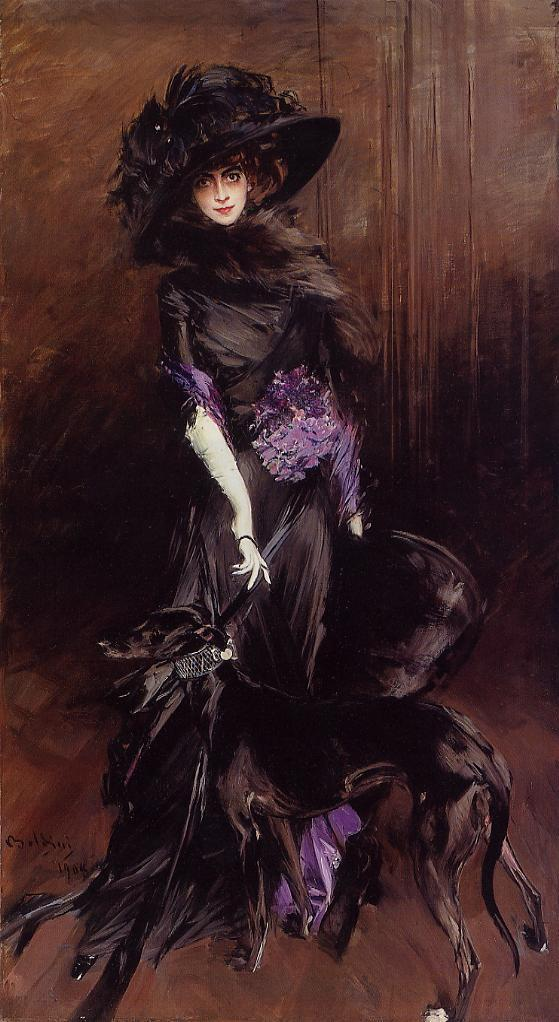
Portrait of La Marchesa Luisa Casati with greyhound, 1908

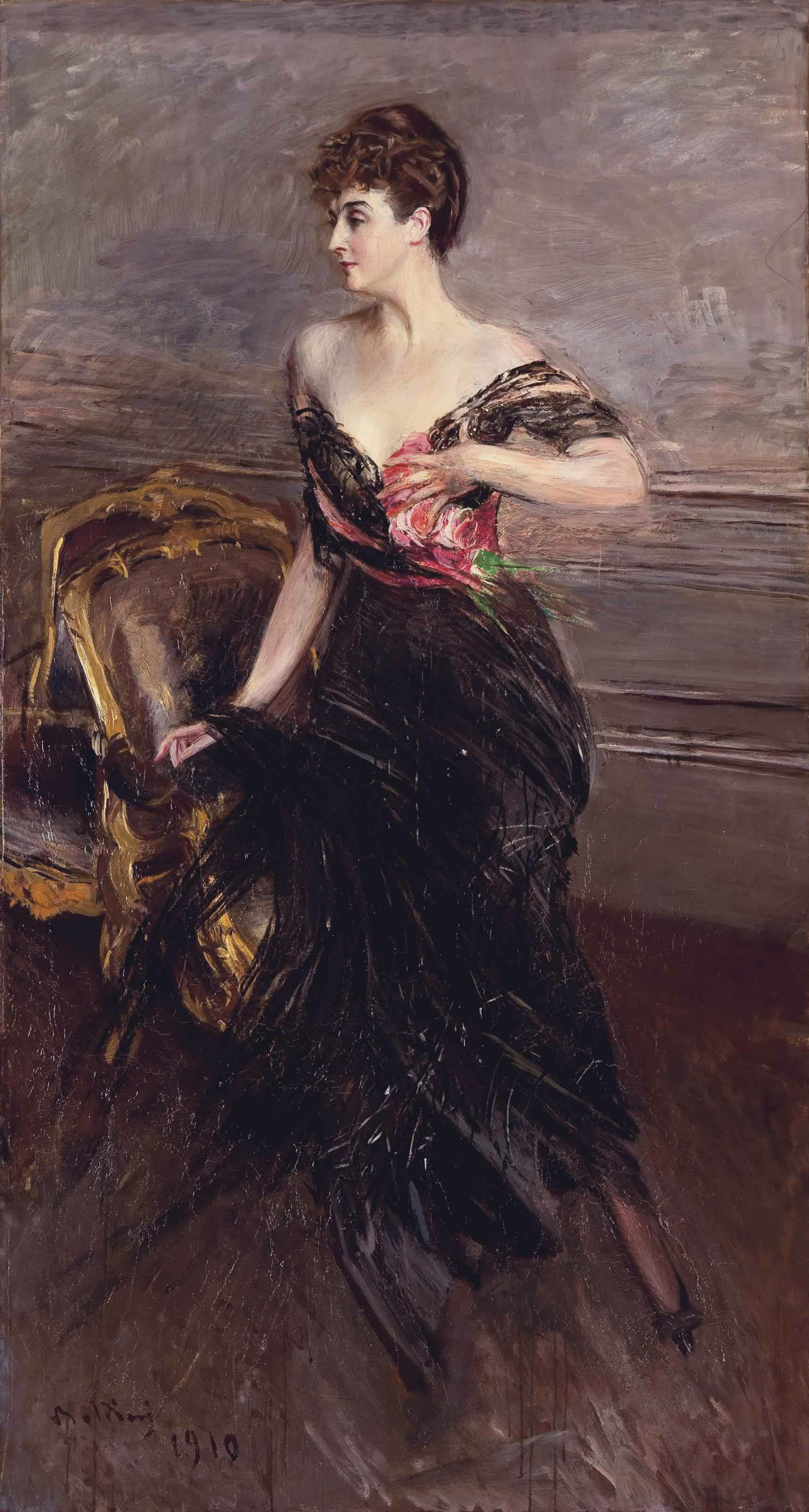
Portrait of the Princess Cécile Murat, Ney d'Elchingen, 1910

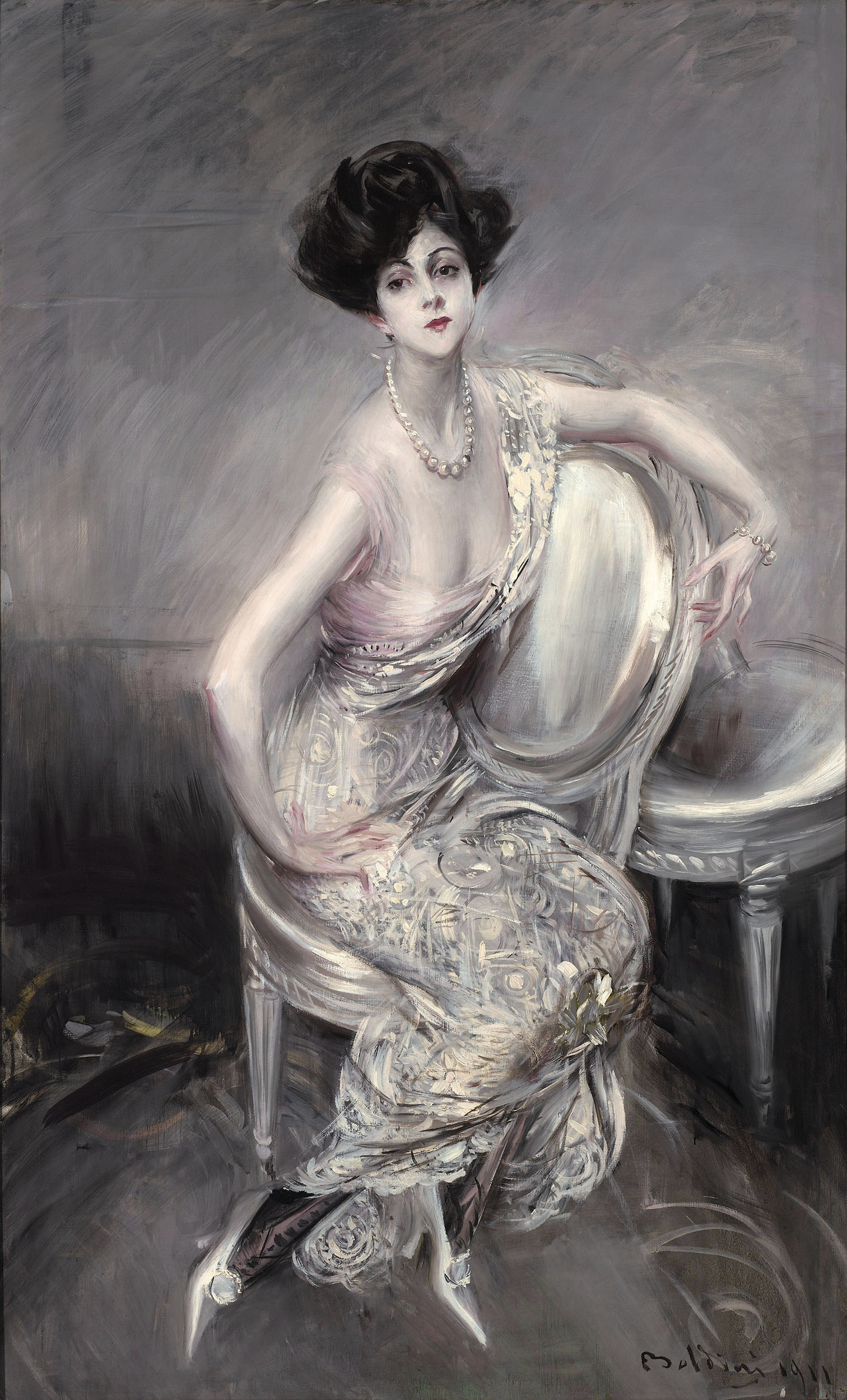
Portrait of Rita de Acosta Lydig, 1911

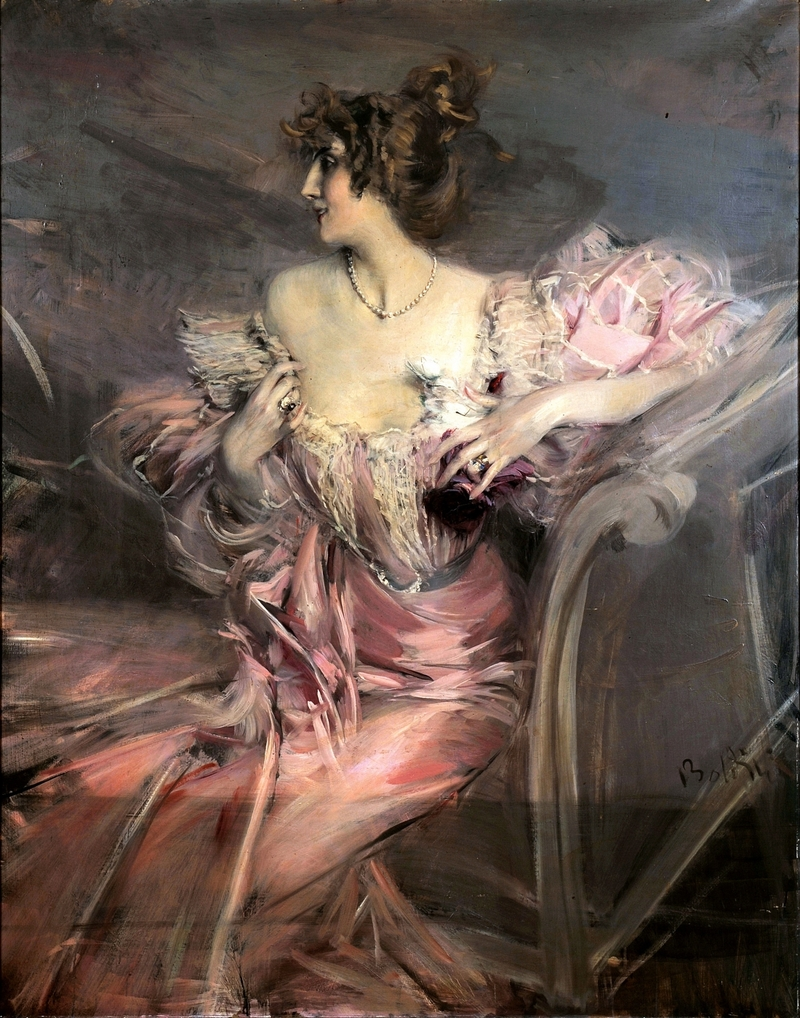
Portrait of the actress Marthe de Florian

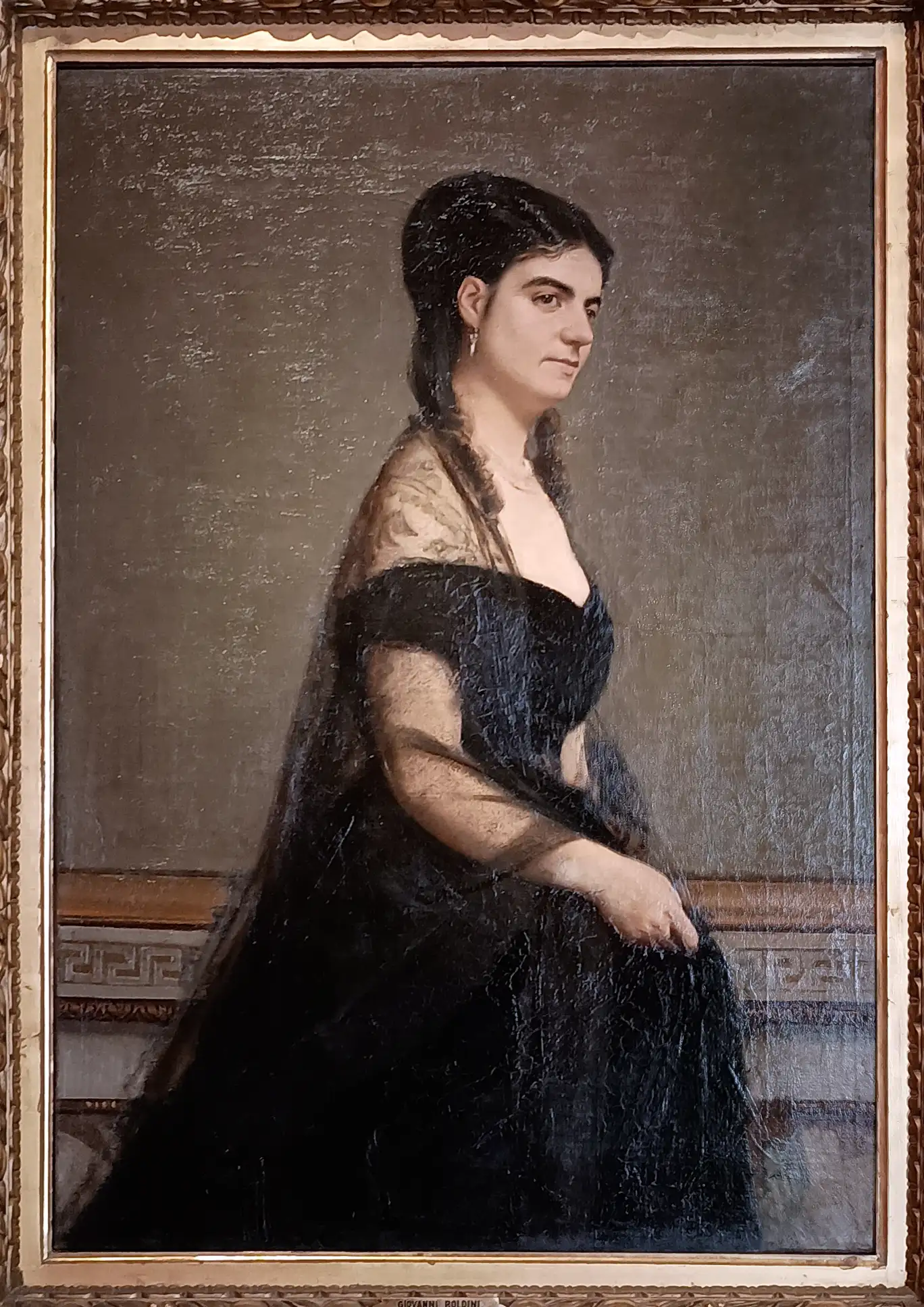
Portrait of Giulia Tempestini Kennedy Lawrie, Galleria di Arte Moderna, Florence, Italy

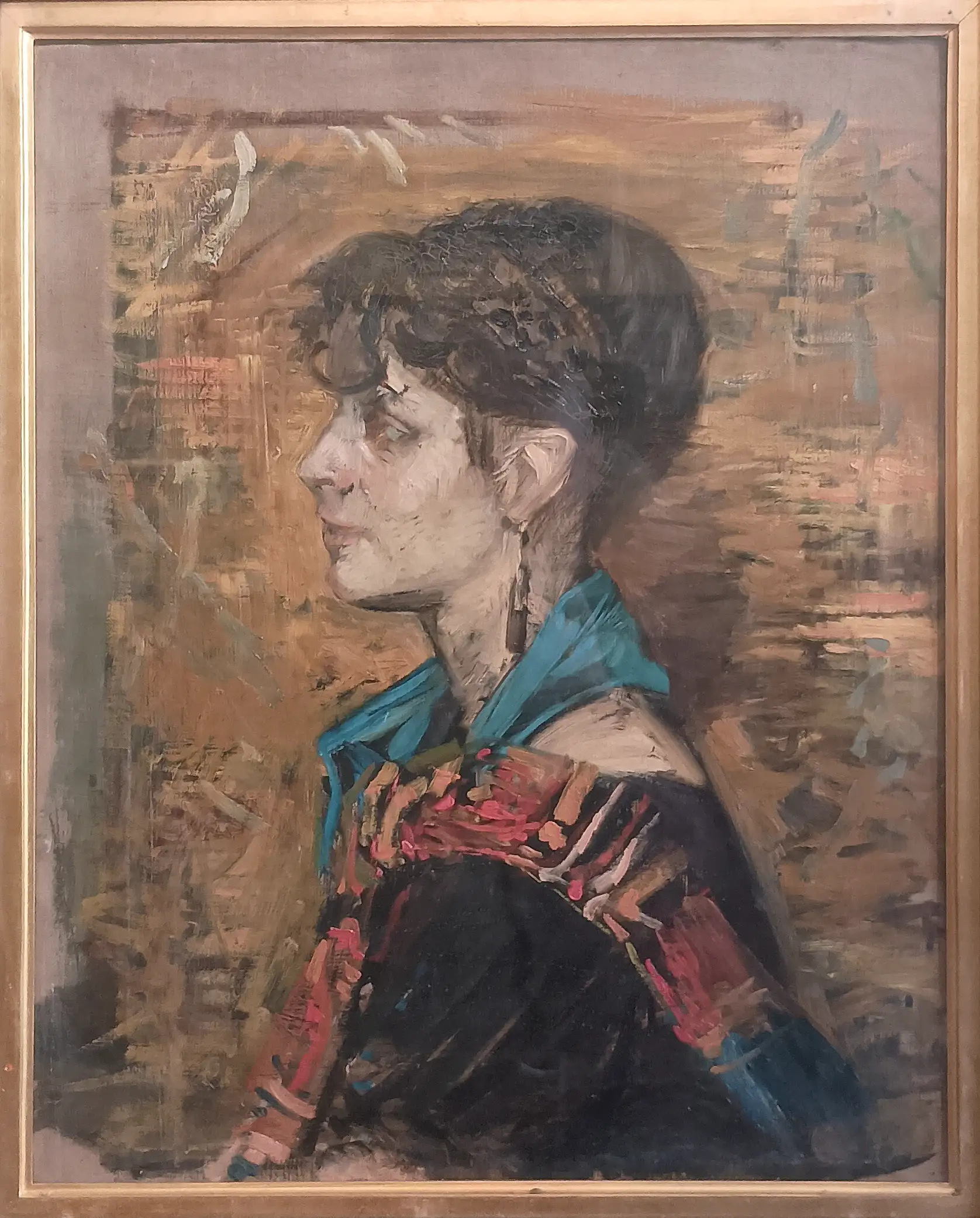
The Gypsy, Galleria di Arte Moderna, Florence, Italy

== In popular culture ==
Boldini is a character in the ballet Franca Florio, regina di Palermo, written in 2007 by the Italian composer Lorenzo Ferrero, which depicts the story of Donna Franca, a famous Sicilian aristocrat whose exceptional beauty inspired him and many other artists, musicians, poets and emperors during the Belle Époque.

A Boldini portrait of his former muse Marthe de Florian, a French actress, was discovered in a Paris flat in late 2010, hidden away from view on the premises that were unvisited for over 50 years. The portrait has never been listed, exhibited or published and the flat belonged to de Florian's granddaughter, who inherited the flat after her father's death in 1966 and lived in the South of France after the outbreak of the Second World War and never returned to Paris. A love-note and a biographical reference to the work painted in 1888, when the actress was 24, cemented its authenticity. A full-length portrait of the lady in the same clothing and accessories, but less provocative, hangs in the New Orleans Museum of Art.

The discovery of his painting in the 70-years-empty apartment forms the background to Michelle Gable's 2014 novel A Paris Apartment.

== Sources ==
- T. Panconi, Boldini, L'uomo e la pittura, Pisa (Italy) 1998
- E. Savoia (a cura di), Giovanni Boldini. Il dinamismo straordinario delle linee, (catalogo della mostra), Bologna (Italy) 1999
- E. Savoia (a cura di), Omaggio a Giovanni Boldini, (catalogo della mostra), Bologna (Italy) 2001
- T. Panconi, Giovanni Boldini, L'opera completa (Catalogo generale ragionato legale), Firenze (Italy) 2002
- P. Dini e F. Dini, Giovanni Boldini 1842-1931. Catalogo ragionato, Torino 2002
- E. Savoia (a cura di), G. Boldini. Dalla macchia alla sperimentazione dinamica, (catalogo della mostra), Bologna (Italy) 2003
- T. Panconi, Boldini Mon Amour (catalogo della mostra, con presentazione del ministro per i beni culturali), Pisa (Italy) 2008
- E. Savoia (a cura di), Giovanni Boldini. Capolavori e opere inedite dall'atelier dell'artista, (catalogo della mostra), Milano (Italy) 2011
- S. Bosi, E. Savoia, Giovanni Boldini. Il Narratore della "dolce vita" parigina, Treviso, Antiga Edizioni 2011
- T. Panconi, S. Gaddi, Boldini e la Belle Epoque (catalogo della mostra), Milano (Italy) 2011
- S. Bosi, E. Savoia, La mostra di Giovanni Boldini del 1963 al Musée Jacquemart-André di Parigi da un album fotografico inedito, Milano (Italy) 2011
- Boldini, Giovanni, Enzo Savoia, and Stefano Bosi. Giovanni Boldini. Capolavori e opere inedite dall'atelier dell'artista. Crocetta del Montello: Antiga. 2011. ISBN 978-88-88997520
- T. Panconi, S. Gaddi, Giovanni Boldini (catalogo della mostra di Roma - Venaria Reale To), Skira editore, Milano 2017
