= Gioacchino =

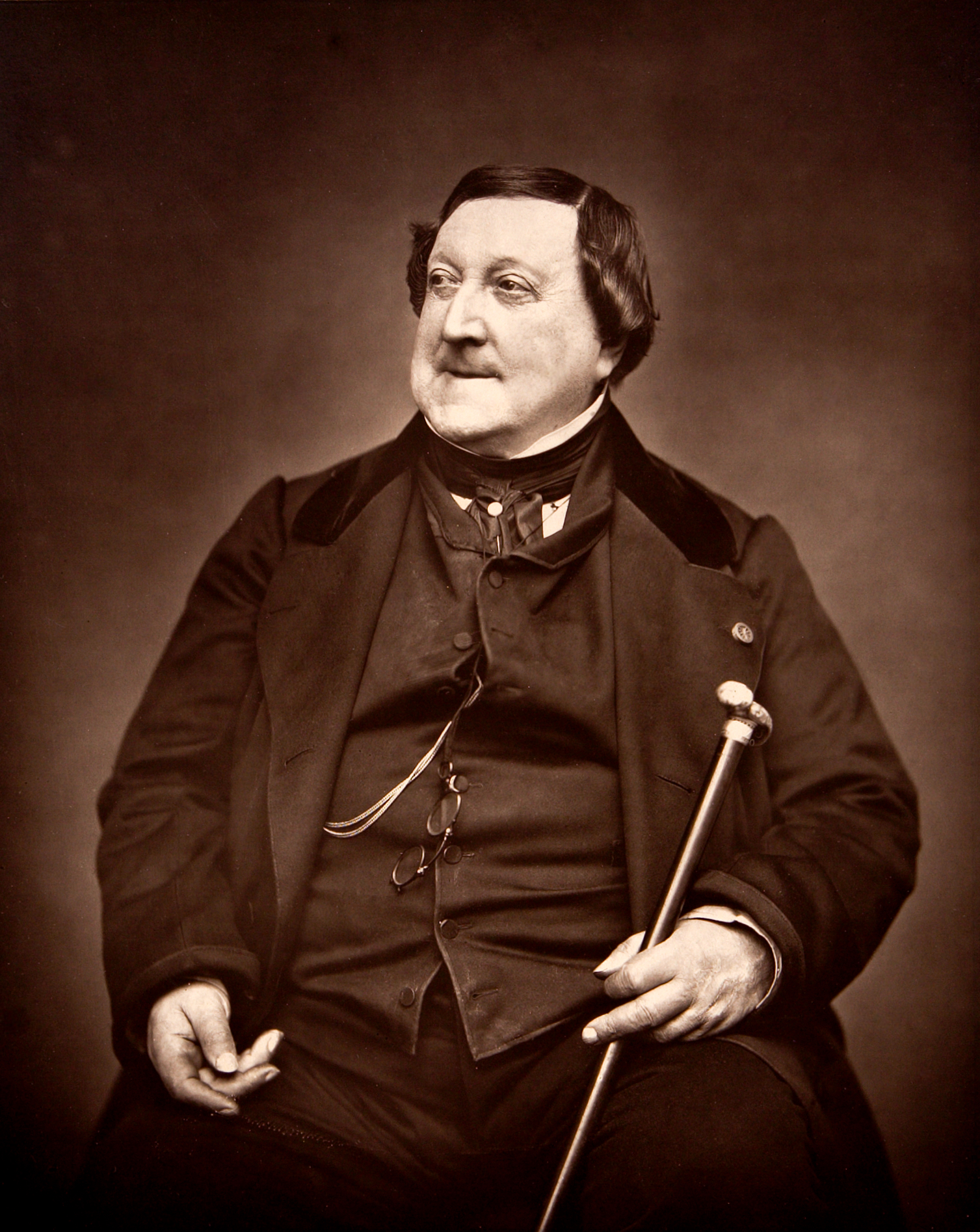
Italian composer Gioacchino Rossini (1865)

Gioacchino (pronounced [dʒoakˈkiːno]) is a masculine Italian given name, equivalent to the English Joachim. Notable people with the name include:

- Gioacchino Albertini (1748–1812), Italian-Polish composer
- Gioacchino Alemagna (1892–1974), Italian pastry chef and entrepreneur
- Gioacchino Amari (1945–1997), Italian-American mobster
- Gioacchino Assereto (1600–1649), Italian painter
- Gioacchino Busin (1930–2008), Italian cross-country skier
- Gioacchino Caracausi (1945–2011), Italian weightlifter
- Gioacchino Cascone (born 1972), Italian rower
- Gioacchino Cocchi (1720–1804), Italian composer
- Gioacchino Colombo (1903–1988), Italian automobile engine designer
- Gioacchino Conti (1714–1761), Italian soprano castrato opera singer
- Gioacchino Criaco (born 1965), Italian writer
- Gioacchino da Fiore (1135–1202), Italian Catholic theologian and abbot
- Gioacchino de Gemmis (1746–1822), Italian Roman Catholic prelate
- Gioacchino de' Gigantibus (fl. 1450–1485), Italian illuminator, miniaturist and copyist
- Gioacchino Di Marzo (1839–1916), Italian art historian, librarian and Jesuit
- Gioacchino Ersoch (1812–1902), Italian architect
- Gioacchino Failla (1891–1961), Italian-American physicist
- Gioacchino Galeotafiore (born 2000), Italian footballer
- Gioacchino Gamberini (1859–c. 1904), Italian painter
- Gioacchino Guaragna (1908–1971), Italian fencer
- Gioacchino Illiano (1935–2020), Italian Roman Catholic prelate
- Gioacchino La Barbera (born 1959), member of the Mafia who became a pentito
- Gioacchino La Lomia (1831–1905), Italian Capuchin missionary and preacher
- Gioacchino Lanza Tomasi (1934–2023), Italian musicologist and academic
- Gioacchino Livigni, Italian-American tenor opera singer
- Gioacchino Martorana (1736–1779), Italian painter
- Gioacchino Muccin (1899–1991), Italian Roman Catholic prelate
- Gioacchino Navarro (1748–1813), Maltese cleric, archaeologist, linguist and librarian, Conventional Parish Priest of the Order of St. John, Malta
- Gioacchino Pagliei (1852–1896), Italian painter
- Gioacchino Pecci (1810–1903), Italian Roman Catholic prelate, head of the Church as Pope Leo XIII
- Gioacchino Pizzoli (1651–1733), Italian painter
- Gioacchino Prati (1790–1863), Italian revolutionary and patriot
- Gioacchino Rossini (1792–1868), Italian composer
- Gioacchino Giuseppe Serangeli (1768–1852), Italian painter
- Gioacchino Scaduto (1898–1979), Italian politician, teacher and jurist
- Gioacchino Solinas (1892–1987), Italian general during World War II
- Gioacchino Toesca (1745–1799), Italian architect in the Spanish Empire
- Gioacchino Toma (1836–1891), Italian painter
- Gioacchino Torriani (c. 1417–1500), Italian Dominican theologian and inquisitor
- Gioacchino Ventura di Raulica (1792–1861), Italian Roman Catholic pulpit orator, patriot, philosopher and writer
- Gioacchino Vitagliano (1669–1739), Italian sculptor
- Gioacchino Vitelli (1785–?), Italian painter
- Gioacchino Volpe (1876–1971), Italian historian

== See also ==
- Nunzio Otello Francesco Gioacchino (c. 1792–1828), soldier and servant during the Napoleonic Wars
- Gioachino, a variant form of the name
- Giovacchino, a variant form of the name
- Giacchino, a surname from the name
- San Gioacchino ai Prati di Castello, a church in Rome
- Santi Gioacchino ed Anna ai Monti, a church in Rome
- Santi Gioacchino ed Anna al Tuscolano, a church in Rome
- Neapolitan ship Gioacchino (1812), a ship of the Royal Navy of the Kingdom of the Two Sicilies
- SS Gioacchino Lauro (1920), a cargo ship
