= List of works by Giovanni Boldini =

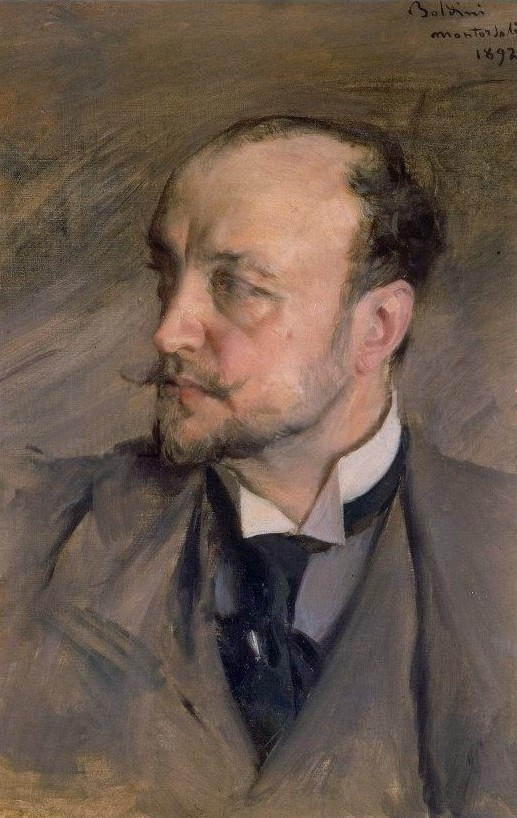
Self-portrait at Montorsoli, (1892)

Giovanni Boldini was an Italian genre and portrait painter who lived and worked in Paris for most of his career. According to a 1933 article in Time magazine, he was known as the "Master of Swish" because of his flowing style of painting.

Boldini first attained success as a portraitist in London, completing portraits of premier members of English society including Lady Holland and the Duchess of Westminster. From 1872, he lived in Paris, where he became a friend of Edgar Degas and became the most fashionable portrait painter in Paris in the late 19th century, with a dashing style of painting which shows some Macchiaioli influence and a brio reminiscent of the work of younger artists, such as John Singer Sargent and Paul Helleu.

== Paintings ==
Year	Title	Image	Collection	Comments
1856	Self portrait at fourteen years old		Museo Boldini	Subject: Giovanni Boldini
c. 1859	Portrait of Francesco Boldini		Museo Boldini	Subject: Little brother of Giovanni Boldini, Francesco
1864-65	Portrait of Lilia Monti born Countess Magnoni, oil on canvas		Estense Castle (Castello Estense), Ferrara	Subject: Lilia Monti
c. 1865	Cristiano Banti			Subject: Cristiano Banti
c. 1865	Pig keeper			
1865	Alaide recovering			Subject: Alaide Banti (1855-1929), daughter of Cristiano Banti
1865	Portrait of Diego Martelli			Subject: Diego Martelli
1865	Giuseppe Abbati			Subject: Giuseppe Abbati
1865	Self-Portrait while looking at a painting, oil on canvas		Galleria d'Arte Moderna in Palazzo Pitti, Florence	Subject: Giovanni Boldini
1865-66	Portrait of Maria Angelini			Subject: Maria Angelini
1865-66	Diego Martelli in Castiglioncello			Subject: Diego Martelli
1866	Portrait of the painter Alessandro Lanfredini, oil on panel		Private	Subject: Alessandro Lanfredini
1866	Portrait of Cristiano Banti with his cane			Subject: Cristiano Banti
1866	Portrait of Alaide Banti in white dress			Subject: Alaide Banti (1855-1929), daughter of Cristiano Banti
1866-67	Giovanni Fattori at the easel		Gallerie d'Italia, Milan	Subject: Giovanni Fattori
1870	The Connoisseur, oil on panel		Private	
1873	The Model and the Mannequin, oil on panel		Private	
1873	The Guitar Player, oil on canvas		Sterling and Francine Clark Art Institute at Williamstown, United States	
1873	Gossip, oil on wood		Metropolitan Museum of Art, New York City	
1873	Les Parisiennes		Vanderbilt collection, Metropolitan Museum of Art, New York City	
1874	La Place Pigalle			
1874	Boy with a Circle, oil on canvas			
1875	Ladies of the First Empire		Vanderbilt collection, Metropolitan Museum of Art	
1875	A Lute Player and a Listener, oil on canvas		Private	
1878	Lady admiring a Fan		Butterfly Institute Fine Art (Gallery), Lugano	
1878	Portrait of Ferdynand Bryndza (1837–1891)		National Museum in Kraków	
1879	The Dispatch-Bearer (c. 1879), oil on wood		Metropolitan Museum of Art	
c. 1880-1890	Portrait of a Dandy			Subject: Henri de Toulouse-Lautrec (1864–1901)
c. 1880	The newspaper seller			
1882	Place Pigalle and the Place de l’Etoile La Villette omnibus			
1883	Girl with Red Shawl, oil on canvas		Private	
1884	The Worldly Singer (La cantante mondana)		Museo Boldini, Ferrara	
c. 1885	The Actress Rejane and her Dog, oil on canvas		Private	Subject:Gabrielle Réjane (1856–1920; French actress)
1885	The Girl with a Black Cat			
1885	Portrait of Mrs. Charles Warren-Cram, oil on canvas		Metropolitan Museum of Art	Subject: Ella Brooks Carter (1846–1896)
1881–86	Two White Horses			
1886	Portrait of Giuseppe Verdi		Casa di Riposo per Musicisti	Subject: Giuseppe Verdi (1813–1901)
1886	Portrait of Giuseppe Verdi		National Gallery of Modern Art, Rome	Subject: Giuseppe Verdi (1813–1901)
1888	Woman in Black who Watches the Pastel of Signora Emiliana Concha de Ossa, oil on canvas		Museo Boldini, Ferrara	
1890	Portrait of John Singer Sargent (c. 1890), oil on panel			Subject: John Singer Sargent (1856–1925; American artist and portrait painter)
1890	Portrait of John Singer Sargent (c. 1890), oil on panel			Subject: John Singer Sargent (1856–1925; American artist and portrait painter)
1890	Portrait of Lucy Gérard (c. 1890), pastel on canvas			Subject: Lucy Gérard (1872–1941; French actress)
1891	Portrait of the little Subercaseaux		Museo Boldini	
1892	Portrait of Josefina Errázuriz Alvear, oil on canvas		Private	Josefina Errázuriz Alvear
1892	Portrait of Madame Josefina Alvear de Errázuriz or Portrait de Madame E, oil on canvas		National Museum of Decorative Arts Buenos Aires	Subject: Josefina Alvear de Errázuriz
1892	Self-Portrait			Subject: Giovanni Boldini
1892	Interior of the artist's studio with the portrait of Giovinetta Errázuriz			Subject: Giovinetta Errazuriz
1894	Portrait of the Countess de Martel de Janville, known as Gypsy, oil on canvas		Musée de la Ville de Paris, Musée Carnavalet, Paris	Subject: Countess de Martel de Janville (1850–1932)
1895	Portrait of a Man Wearing a Top Hat: Poet Hanvin, from the Figaro, oil on panel			
1897	Portrait of Lady Colin Campbell, oil on canvas		National Portrait Gallery, London	Subject: Gertrude Elizabeth Blood (1857–1911)
1897	Portrait of J. A. M. Whistler, oil on canvas		Brooklyn Museum, New York	Subject: James McNeill Whistler (1834–1903)
1897	Portrait of Robert de Montesquiou		Musée d'Orsay, Paris	Subject: Robert de Montesquiou (1855–1921; Gay French poet and writer)
1898	Portrait of Madame Georges Hugo, and her son Jean, oil on canvas		Private	Subject: Madame Georges Hugo (born Pauline Ménard-Dorian) and her son, Jean Hugo
c. 1899	Room of the Painter			
1900	Portrait of a Man in a Church, watercolor		Private	
1900–1910	Portrait of Marthe de Florian		Private	Rediscovered in 2010, Subject: Marthe de Florian (1864-1939), French demi-mondaine and socialite during the Belle Époque
1901	Portrait of Mme. Lina Cavalieri, oil on canvas		Art Institute of Chicago, Chicago, Illinois	Subject: Lina Cavalieri (1874–1944); Italian operatic soprano and diseuse
1903	Portrait of a Lady, Mrs. Lionel Phillips			Subject: Dorothea Sarah Florence Alexandra (1863–1940)
1904	Portrait of Sarah Bernhardt			Subject: Sarah Bernhardt (1844–1923; French stage and film actress)
1904	Princess Radziwill with Red Ribbon			Subject: Princess Catherine Radziwill
1905	Portrait of Elizabeth Wharton Drexel, oil on canvas			Subject: Elizabeth Wharton Drexel (1868–1944; American author and Manhattan socialite)
1905	The Black Sash, oil on canvas		Private	
1905	Portrait of Countess Zichy, oil on canvas			Subject: Countess Eleonóra Zichy
1905	Portrait of Willy		Private	Subject: the writer Henri Gauthier-Villars
1906	Portrait of Ethel Mary Crocker			Subject: lived 1891–1964; daughter of Mrs. William H. Crocker; later Countess de Limur.
1906	Portrait of Mrs. Howard-Johnston, oil on canvas		Private	Subject: Howard-Johnston
1906	Consuelo Vanderbilt, Duchess of Marlborough, and Her Son, Lord Ivor Spencer-Churchill, oil on canvas		Metropolitan Museum of Art, New York City	Subjects: Consuelo Vanderbilt (1876–1964). Lord Ivor Spencer-Churchill (1898–1956).
1908	Portrait of Marchesa Luisa Casati, with a Greyhound, oil			Subject: Luisa Casati (1881–1957; Italian heiress and patroness of arts)
1909	La Passeggiata al Bois			
1910	Portrait de la princesse Cécile Murat, Ney d'Elchingen, oil on canvas		Private	Subject: Princess Cécile Murat Ney d'Elchingen (wife of Joachim, 5th Prince Murat)
1910	Portrait of Anita De La Feria, The Spanish Dancer, oil on canvas		Private	Subject: Anita de la Ferie
1910–1914	Canale a Venezia con gondole		Art collections of Fondazione Cariplo	Venice
1910	Ritratto di Josefina Errazuriz Alvear con il suo gatto			
1911	Portrait of Princess Marthe Bibesco, oil on canvas			Subject: Marthe Bibesco (1886–1973)
1911	Portrait of Rita de Acosta Lydig, oil on canvas		M.S. Rau Antiques, New Orleans	Subject: Rita de Acosta Lydig (1875–1929)
1911	Self-Portrait		Museo Boldini, Ferrara	Subject: Giovanni Boldini
1912	Portrait of Mlle. de Gillespie, La Dame de Biarritz, oil on canvas		Private	
1912	Portrait of a Lady		Brooklyn Museum	Subject: Florence Meyer Blumenthal
1913	The Misses Muriel and Consuelo Vanderbilt		Fine Arts Museums of San Francisco	Subjects: Muriel and Consuelo Vanderbilt
1913	Portrait of a Lady, Lina Bilitis, with two Pekineses, oil on canvas		Private	Subject: Lina Bilitis
1913	Madame Michelham		N.A.	Subject: Madame Michelham
1914	Portrait of the Marchesa Luisa Casati			Subject: Luisa Casati (1881–1957; Italian heiress and patroness of arts)
1914	Portrait of Mrs. Leeds			Subject: May Leeds, later Princess Anastasia of Greece and Denmark (1878–1923; American heiress, later a Greek princess by marriage)
1916	Lady in Rose, oil on canvas		Museo Boldini, Ferrara	Subject: Olivia de Santiago Concha, 4th Marchioness of Casa Concha
1924	Portrait of Donna Franca Florio, oil on canvas			
	Josefina Alvear de Errázuriz			
	Portrait of Madame Josefina A. de Errázuriz			
	Kitchen Garden			
	Repose in the Atelier			
	Studies for the Portrait of Marchesa Luisa Casati			Subject: Luisa Casati (1881–1957; Italian heiress and patroness of arts)
	The Art Connoisseur, oil on panel		Private	
	Reclining Nude, oil on canvas		Private	
	A Lady with a Cat, watercolor		Private	
	Gentleman at the Piano			
	Woman at the Piano, oil on canvas		Private	
	Lady Pianist, watercolor		Private	
	Theatre			
	Woman in Red			
	The Pianist A. Rey Colaco			Subject: Alexandre Rey Colaço (1854–1928; Portuguese pianist)
	The Rose in Vase of Sassonia			
	Still Life with Rose			
	Sitting in the Garden			
	Statue in the Park of Versailles			
	Angels			

== Prints and drawings ==
Year	Title	Image	Collection	Comments
1883	Famous Connoisseur (Fameux Connaisseur), crayon and pencil on graph paper		Metropolitan Museum of Art, New York City	
1884	Portrait of the Artist, pen and brown ink		Metropolitan Museum of Art, New York City	
1885	Audience at a Parisian Theatre I (c. 1885), Graphite on cream wove paper		Art Institute of Chicago, Chicago, Illinois	
1885	Audience at a Parisian Theatre II (c. 1885), Graphite on cream wove paper		Art Institute of Chicago, Chicago, Illinois	
1897	Hansom Cabs, New York (c. 1897), black chalk on ruled paper		Metropolitan Museum of Art, New York City	
1897	Whistler Dozing, drypoint on paper	view	Art Institute of Chicago, Chicago, Illinois	
1904	Portrait of the Marquis de Biron (c. 1904), black chalk		Metropolitan Museum of Art, New York City	
1905	Portrait of a Lady (c. 1905), crayon on paper		Metropolitan Museum of Art, New York City	
	Portrait of Edward G. Kennedy, black graphite		Metropolitan Museum of Art, New York City	Subject: lived 1849–1932.
	Leda with Swan			Subject: Leda
	Sarah Bernhardt, sketch, pencil on paper		Private	Subject: Sarah Bernhardt (1844–1923; French actress)
	Statue, sketch, pencil on paper		Private	Published (n. 1909) in Bianca Doria, Boldini: I disegni di Giovanni Boldini: Catalogo Generale, Skira, 2011, ISBN 978-88-572-1140-4
	Face of woman, sketch, pencil on paper		Private	

== Sources ==
- T. Panconi, Boldini, L'uomo e la pittura, Pisa (Italy) 1998
- E. Savoia (a cura di), Giovanni Boldini. Il dinamismo straordinario delle linee, (catalogo della mostra), Bologna (Italy) 1999
- E. Savoia (a cura di), Omaggio a Giovanni Boldini, (catalogo della mostra), Bologna (Italy) 2001
- T. Panconi, Giovanni Boldini, L'opera completa (Catalogo generale ragionato legale), Firenze (Italy) 2002
- P. Dini e F. Dini, Giovanni Boldini 1842-1931. Catalogo ragionato, Torino, 2002
- E. Savoia (a cura di), G. Boldini. Dalla macchia alla sperimentazione dinamica, (catalogo della mostra), Bologna (Italy) 2003
- T. Panconi, Boldini Mon Amour (catalogo della mostra, con presentazione del ministro per i beni culturali), Pisa (Italy) 2008
- E. Savoia (a cura di), Giovanni Boldini. Capolavori e opere inedite dall'atelier dell'artista, (catalogo della mostra), Milano (Italy) 2011
- S. Bosi, E. Savoia, Giovanni Boldini. Il Narratore della "dolce vita" parigina, Treviso, Antiga Edizioni, 2011
- T. Panconi, S. Gaddi, Boldini e la Belle Epoque (catalogo della mostra), Milano (Italy) 2011
- S. Bosi, E. Savoia, La mostra di Giovanni Boldini del 1963 al Musée Jacquemart-André di Parigi da un album fotografico inedito, Milano (Italy) 2011
- Boldini, Giovanni, Enzo Savoia, and Stefano Bosi. Giovanni Boldini. Capolavori e opere inedite dall'atelier dell'artista. Crocetta del Montello: Antiga. 2011. ISBN 9788888997520
- T. Panconi, S. Gaddi, Giovanni Boldini (catalogo della mostra di Roma - Venaria Reale To), Skira editore, Milano, 2017
