= National Museum of San Matteo, Pisa =

Coordinates: 43.7145°N 10.4076°E

National Museum of San Matteo Museo Nazionale di San Matteo
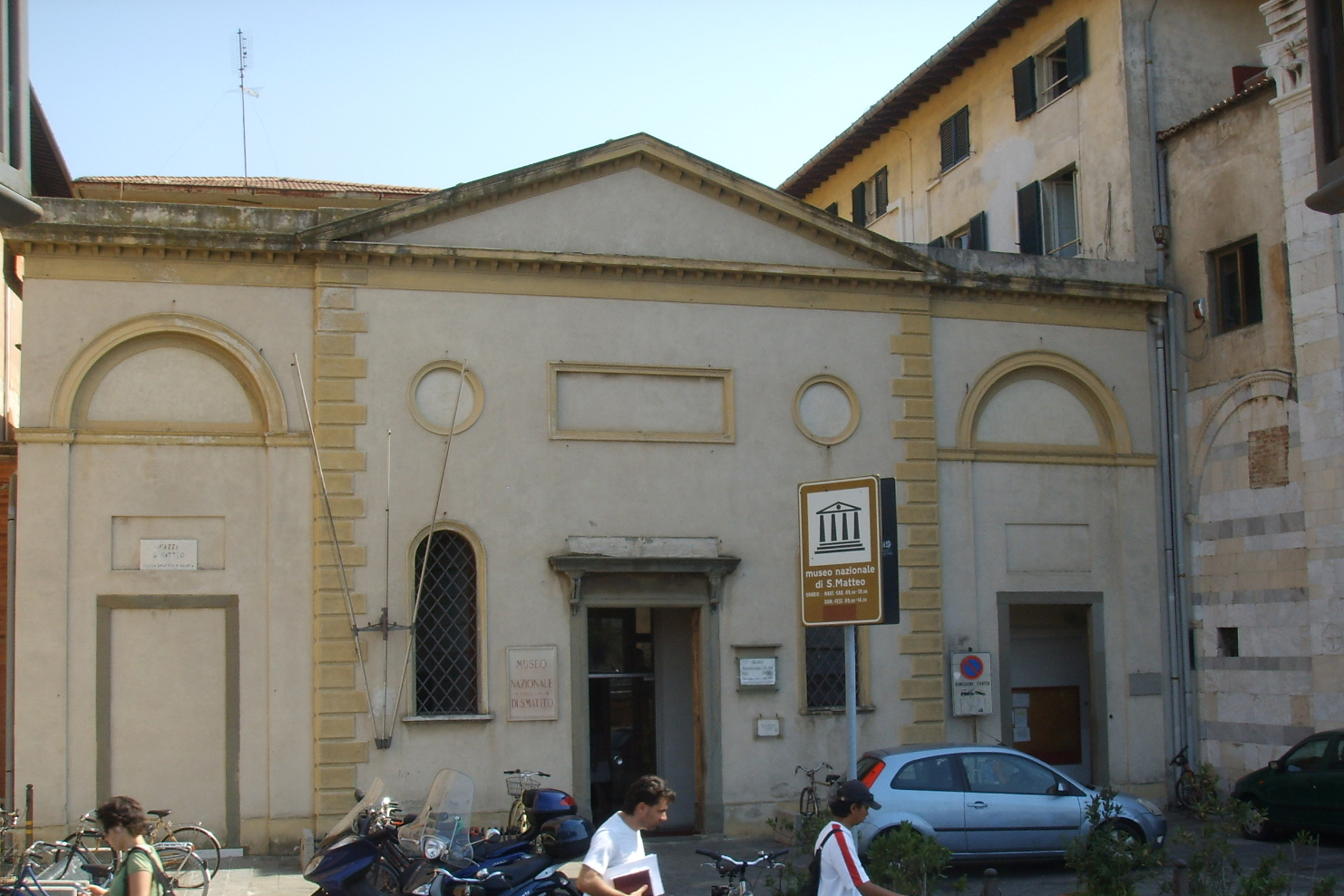
- Location: piazza San Matteo 1, lungarno Mediceo, Pisa Italy
- Type: archaeology, Art museum, Historic site

The National Museum of San Matteo in Pisa (Museo Nazionale di San Matteo) displays works from historic ecclesiastical buildings in the city and Province of Pisa.

== Collections ==
The works span from early medieval period to the 16th century. The collection includes sculptural masterworks by Nicola Pisano and Donatello. It has a rich collection of antique paintings, including works by Berlinghiero Volterrano, Giunta Pisano, Simone Martini, Lippo Memmi, Francesco Traini, Masaccio, Beato Angelico, Benozzo di Lese, and Ghirlandaio. The museum also has a collection of medieval illuminated manuscripts, wooden religious sculpture from 13th century to 15th century, and antique ceramics.

== History ==
The nucleus of the collection was initially started by a 1796 endowment by the Canon of the Pisa Cathedral, Sebastiano Zucchetti. Further works were added after the Napoleonic closure of many religious establishments, and through the Academy of Fine Arts. In 1893, a local Jewish citizen, Igino Benvenuto Supino, helped found the Pisan Museo Civico. In 1949, the Museo Civico collection help form the nucleus for the present Museo Nazionale, installed in the restored medieval Convent of San Matteo in Soarta.

== Sources ==
- Beni Culturali of Italy, Official website for Museum, including catalogue of collections.
