= Gamberini =

Gamberini is a surname and may refer to:

- Alessandro Gamberini (born 1981), Italian footballer
- Bruno Gamberini, (1950-2011), Brazilian archbishop
- Fabio Gamberini, Brazilian race-driver
- Gioacchino Gamberini 19th-century Italian painter
