= Romantic music =

Music of the Romantic period

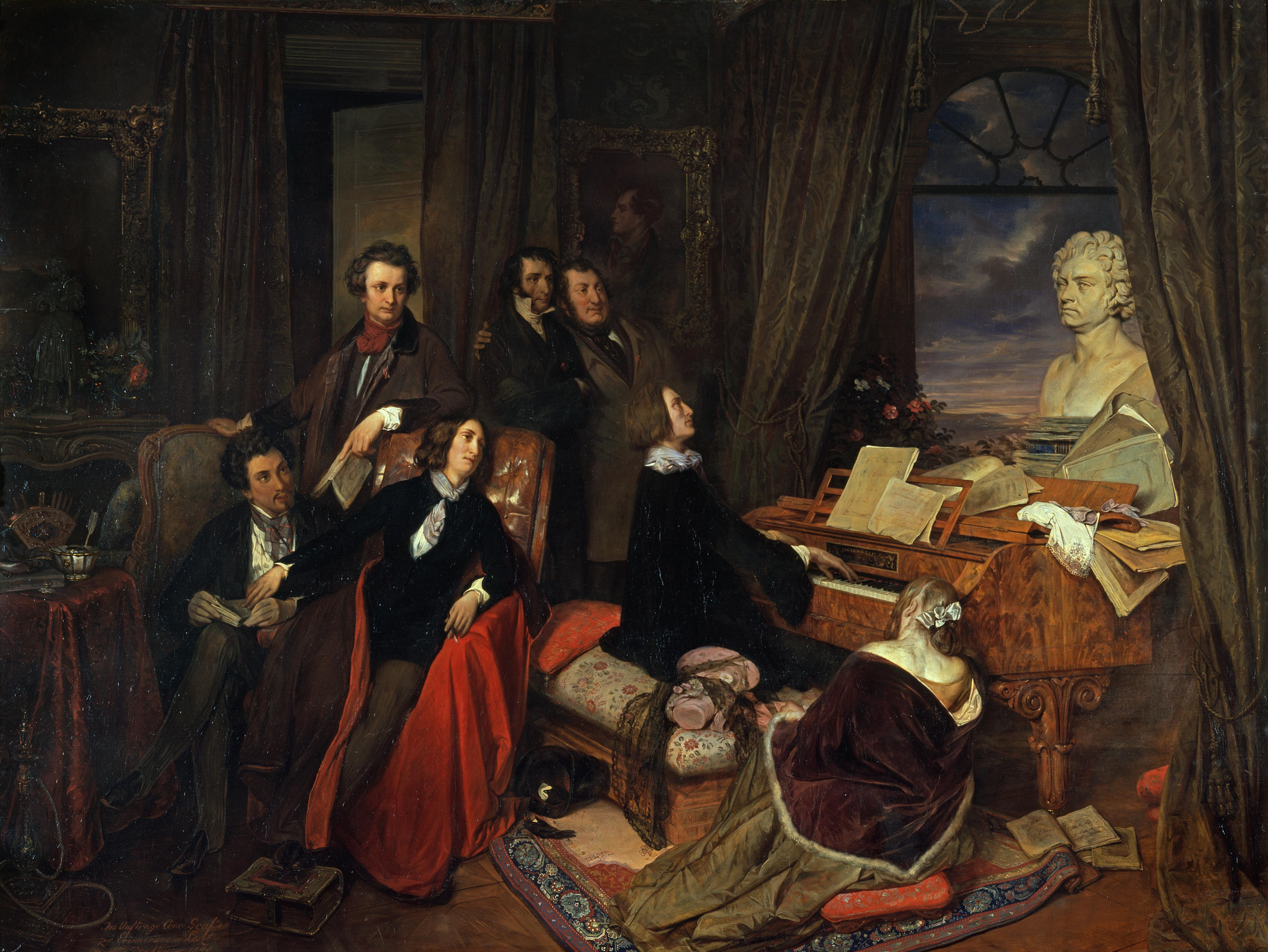
Josef Danhauser's 1840 painting Liszt at the Piano featuring Franz Liszt at the piano surrounded by (from left to right) Alexandre Dumas, Hector Berlioz, George Sand, Niccolò Paganini, Gioachino Rossini and Marie d'Agoult, with a bust of Ludwig van Beethoven on the piano

Romantic music is a stylistic movement in Western Classical music associated with the period of the 19th century commonly referred to as the Romantic era (or Romantic period). It is closely related to the broader concept of Romanticism—the intellectual, artistic, and literary movement that became prominent in Western culture from about 1798 until 1837.

Romantic composers sought to create music that was individualistic, emotional, dramatic, and often programmatic; reflecting broader trends within the movements of Romantic literature, poetry, art, and philosophy. Romantic music was often ostensibly inspired by (or else sought to evoke) non-musical stimuli, such as nature, literature, poetry, super-natural elements, or the fine arts. It included features such as increased chromaticism and moved away from traditional forms.

== Background ==
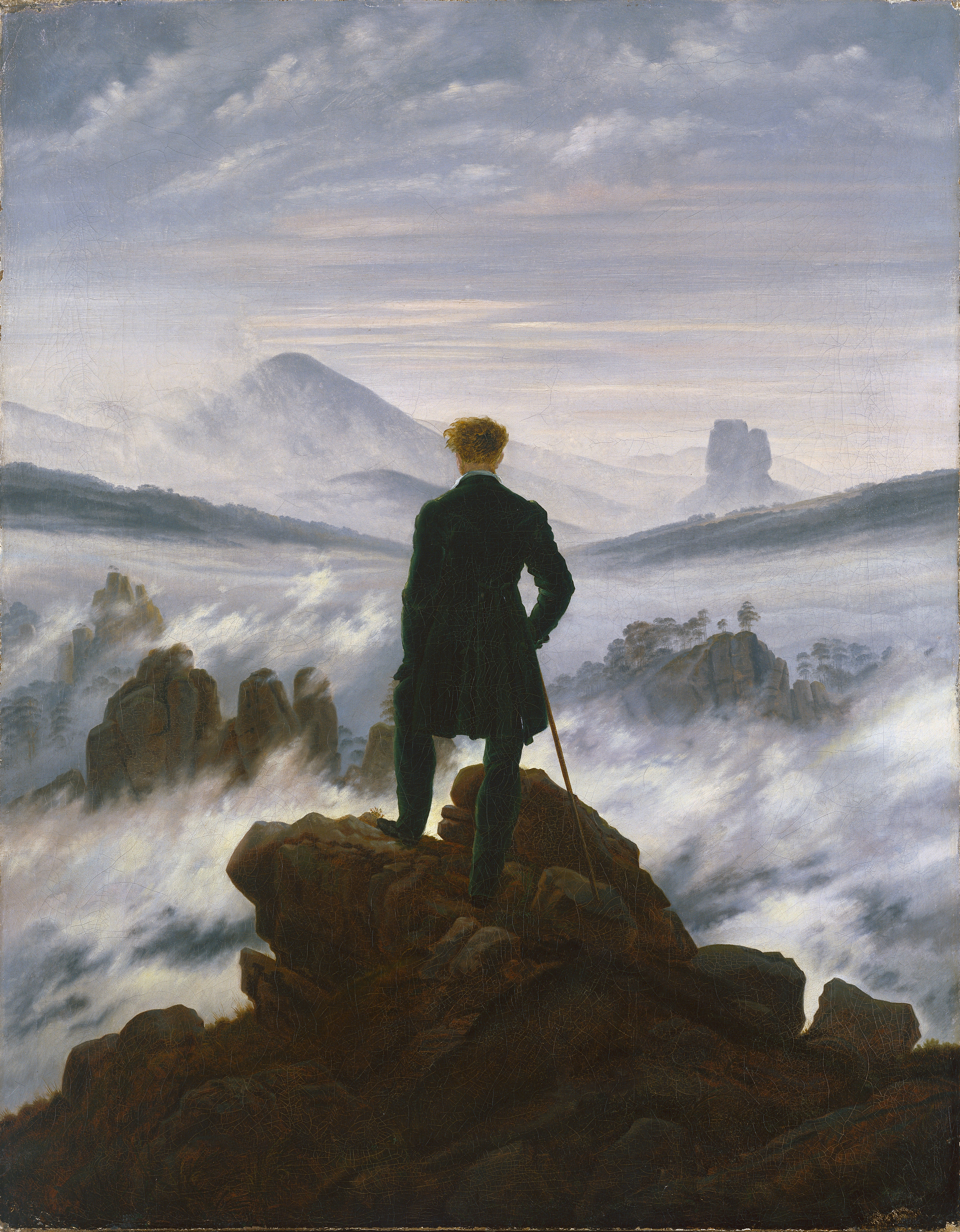
Wanderer above the Sea of Fog, by Caspar David Friedrich, is an example of Romantic painting.

The Romantic movement was an artistic, literary, and intellectual movement that originated in the second half of the 18th century in Europe and strengthened in reaction to the Industrial Revolution. In part, it was a revolt against social and political norms of the Age of Enlightenment and a reaction against the scientific rationalization of nature. It was embodied most strongly in the visual arts, music, literature, and education, and was in turn influenced by developments in natural history.

One of the first significant applications of the term to music was in 1789, in the Mémoires by the Frenchman André Grétry. It was E. T. A. Hoffmann who established the principles of musical romanticism, in a lengthy review of Ludwig van Beethoven's Fifth Symphony published in 1810, and an 1813 article on Beethoven's instrumental music. In the first of these essays Hoffmann traced the beginnings of musical Romanticism to the later works of Haydn and Mozart.

It was Hoffmann's fusion of ideas already associated with the term "Romantic", used in opposition to the restraint and formality of Classical models, that elevated music, and especially instrumental music, to a position of pre-eminence in Romanticism as the art most suited to the expression of emotions. It was also through the writings of Hoffmann and other German authors that German music was brought to the center of musical Romanticism.

== Traits ==
The classical period often used short, even fragmentary, thematic material while the Romantic period tended to make greater use of longer, more fully defined and more emotionally evocative themes.

Characteristics often attributed to Romanticism:

- a new preoccupation with and surrender to nature;
- a turn towards the mystic and supernatural, both religious and unearthly;
- a focus on the nocturnal, the ghostly, the frightful, and terrifying;
- a new attention given to national identity;
- discontent with musical formulas and conventions;
- a greater emphasis on melody to sustain musical interest;
- increased chromaticism;
- a harmonic structure based on movement from tonic to subdominant or alternative keys rather than the traditional dominant, and use of more elaborate harmonic progressions (Wagner and Liszt are known for their experimental progressions);
- large, grand orchestras were common during this period;
- increase in virtuosic players featured in orchestrations;
- the use of new or previously not so common musical structures like the song cycle, nocturne, concert etude, arabesque, and rhapsody, alongside the traditional classical genres;
- Program music became somewhat more common;
- the use of a wider range of dynamics, for example from ppp to fff (from pianississimo, or very, very quiet to fortississimo, very, very loud), supported by large orchestration;
- a greater tonal range (for example, using the lowest and highest notes of the piano);

In music, there is a relatively clear dividing line in musical structure and form following the death of Beethoven. Whether one counts Beethoven as a "romantic" composer or not, the breadth and power of his work gave rise to a feeling that the classical sonata form and, indeed, the structure of the symphony, sonata and string quartet had been exhausted.

== Trends of the 19th century ==
=== Non-musical influences ===
Events and changes in society such as ideas, attitudes, discoveries, inventions, and historical events often affect music. For example, the Industrial Revolution was in full effect by the late 18th century and early 19th century. This event profoundly affected music: there were major improvements in the mechanical valves and keys that most woodwinds and brass instruments depend on. The new and innovative instruments could be played with greater ease and they were more reliable.

Another development that affected music was the rise of the middle class. Composers before this period lived under the patronage of the aristocracy. Many times their audience was small, composed mostly of the upper class and individuals who were knowledgeable about music. The Romantic composers, on the other hand, often wrote for public concerts and festivals, with large audiences of paying customers, who had not necessarily had any music lessons. Composers of the Romantic Era, like Elgar, showed the world that there should be "no segregation of musical tastes" and that the "purpose was to write music that was to be heard".

"The music composed by Romantic [composers]" reflected "the importance of the individual" by being composed in ways that were often less restrictive and more often focused on the composer's skills as a person than prior means of writing music.

=== Nationalism ===
During the Romantic period, music often took on a much more nationalistic purpose. Composers composed with a distinct sound that represented their home country and traditions. For example, Jean Sibelius' Finlandia has been interpreted to represent the rising nation of Finland, which would someday gain independence from Russian control.

Frédéric Chopin was one of the first composers to incorporate nationalistic elements into his compositions. Joseph Machlis states, "Poland's struggle for freedom from tsarist rule aroused the national poet in Poland. ... Examples of musical nationalism abound in the output of the Romantic era. The folk idiom is prominent in the Mazurkas of Chopin". His mazurkas and polonaises are particularly notable for their use of nationalistic rhythms. Moreover, "During World War II the Nazis forbade the playing of ... Chopin's Polonaises in Warsaw because of the powerful symbolism residing in these works".

Other composers, such as Bedřich Smetana, wrote pieces that musically described their homelands. In particular, Smetana's Vltava is a symphonic poem about the Moldau River in the modern-day Czech Republic, the second in a cycle of six nationalistic symphonic poems collectively titled Má vlast (My Homeland). Smetana also composed eight nationalist operas, all of which remain in the repertory. They established him as the first Czech nationalist composer as well as the most important Czech opera composer of the generation who came to prominence in the 1860s.

== History ==
=== Early Romantic ===
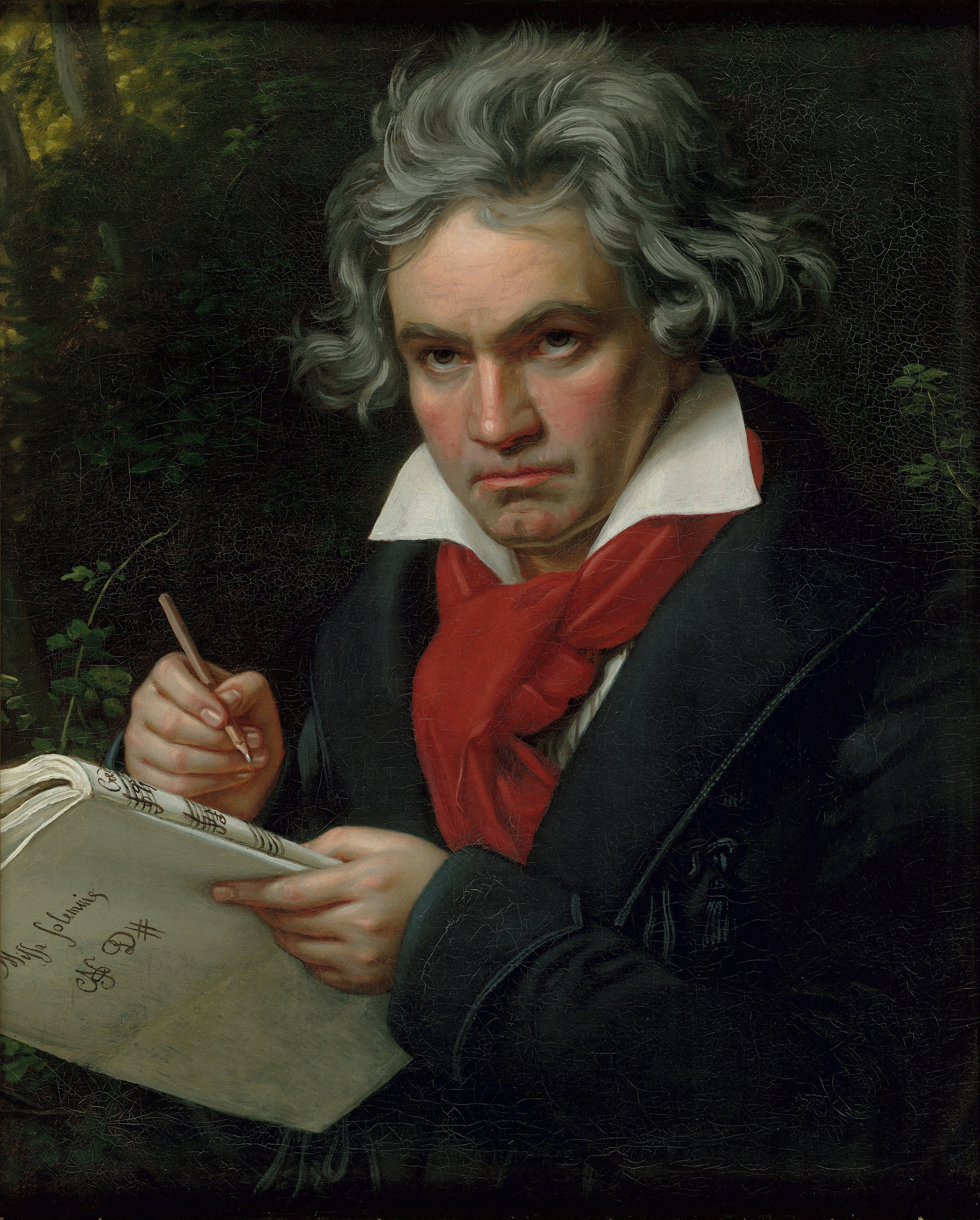
Ludwig van Beethoven

The transition of Viennese classicism to Romanticism can be found in the work of Ludwig van Beethoven. Many typically romantic elements are encountered for the first time in his works. These works contrast with vocal music and are "purely" instrumental music. According to Hoffmann, the pure instrumental music of Viennese classical music, especially that of Beethoven, is the embodiment of the romantic art idea, since it is free of material or program.

Another of the most important representatives of late classicism and early romanticism is Franz Schubert. He introduced romantic features into German-language opera with his chamber music works and later symphonies. Carl Loewe's ballads were also influential. Carl Maria von Weber is important for the development of the German opera, especially with his popular opera Der Freischütz. There are supernatural horror operas by Heinrich Marschner and cheerful operas by Albert Lortzing. Louis Spohr became known mainly for his instrumental music. Still largely attached to classical music is the work of Johann Nepomuk Hummel, Ferdinand Ries, and the Frenchman George Onslow.

Italy experienced the heyday of the Belcanto opera in early Romanticism, associated with the names of Gioachino Rossini, Gaetano Donizetti, and Vincenzo Bellini. While Rossini's comic operas are more commonly known today, though often only through their rousing overtures, Donizetti and Bellini dominate tragic content. The most important Italian instrumental composer of this time was the legendary "devil's violinist" Niccolò Paganini.

In France, light opéra comique developed. Its representatives are François-Adrien Boieldieu, Daniel-François-Esprit Auber, and Adolphe Adam, with Adam known for his ballets. The famous eccentric composer and harpist Robert Nicolas-Charles Bochsa wrote seven operas. The grand opéra used pompous stage sets, ballets and large choirs. The genre was first introduced by Gaspare Spontini; Giacomo Meyerbeer was a notable composer of such works.

Elsewhere in Europe, the Irishman John Field composed the first Nocturnes for piano. Friedrich Kuhlau worked in Denmark. The Swede Franz Berwald wrote four very idiosyncratic symphonies.

=== High Romantic ===
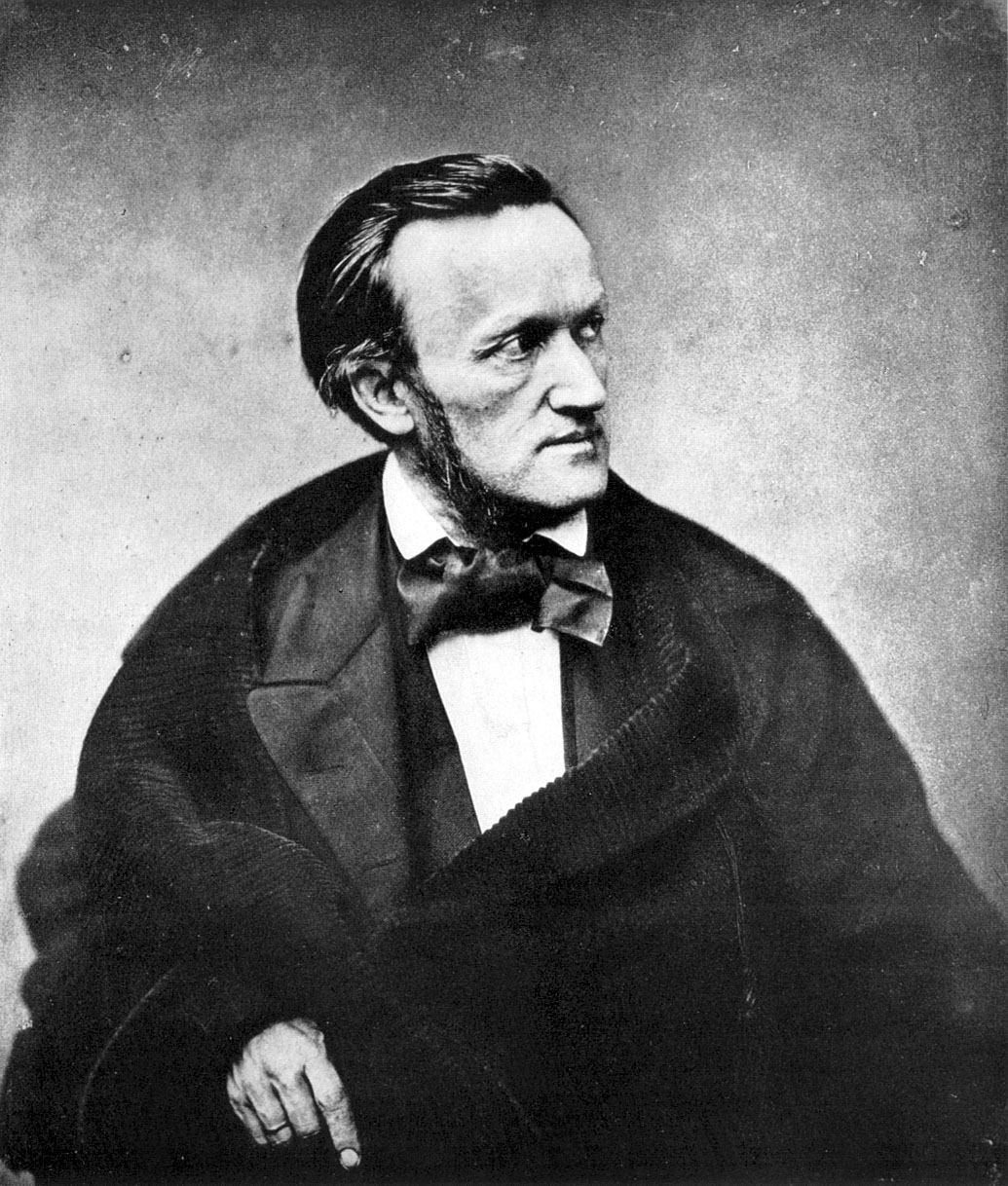
Richard Wagner in Paris, 1861

High romanticism can be divided into two phases. In the first phase, the actual romantic music reaches its peak. The Polish composer Frédéric Chopin explored the depths of emotion in his character pieces and dances for piano. Robert Schumann's struggles with mental illness represent in person as well as in music the prototype of the passionate romantic artist shadowed by tragedy. His idiosyncratic piano pieces, chamber music works and symphonies had a lasting influence on the following generation of musicians.

Franz Liszt, a Hungarian composer, was both a celebrated piano virtuoso and also laid the foundation for the progressive "New German School" with his harmoniously bold symphonic poems. Hector Berlioz also wrote programmatic music with his technique of the idée fixe. Berlioz also significantly expanded the orchestra. Felix Mendelssohn was more oriented towards the classicist formal language and became a role model, especially for Scandinavian composers such as the Dane Niels Wilhelm Gade.

In opera, the operas of Otto Nicolai and Friedrich von Flotow still dominated in Germany when Richard Wagner wrote his first romantic operas. The early works of Giuseppe Verdi were also still based on the Belcanto ideal of the older generation. In France, the opéra lyrique was developed by Ambroise Thomas and Charles Gounod. Russian music found its own language in the operas of Mikhail Glinka and Alexander Dargomyzhsky.

The second phase of high romanticism runs in parallel with the style of realism in literature and the visual arts. In the second half of his creation, Wagner now developed his leitmotif technique, with which he holds together the four-part Ring of the Nibelungen, composed without arias; the orchestra is treated symphonically. Chromaticism reaches its extreme in Tristan und Isolde. Many composers were influenced by Wagner's progressive ideas, among them, for example, Peter Cornelius.

These progressive ideas were opposed by other more conservative composers. For these composers, Johannes Brahms, who sought a logical continuation of classical music in symphony, chamber music and song, became a model due to his depth of sensation and masterful musical technique. Among these conservative composers were Robert Volkmann, Friedrich Kiel, Carl Reinecke, Max Bruch, Josef Gabriel Rheinberger, and Hermann Goetz.

Not all composers fell neatly into the progressive or conservative camps. Among them, Anton Bruckner particularly stands out. Although supporter of Wagner, his clear-form style differs significantly from that of Wagner. For example, the block-based instrumentation of Bruckner's symphonies is derived from the registers of the organ. In the ideological struggle against Wagner's adversaries, he was portrayed by his followers as a counterpart of Brahms. Felix Draeseke, who originally wrote "future music in classical form" inspired by Liszt, also stands apart.

Verdi also had a great impact on musical drama. His immense charisma made all other composers fade in Italy, including Amilcare Ponchielli and Arrigo Boito, who was also the librettist of Verdi's later operas Otello and Falstaff.

In France, the satirical and comic operettas of Jacques Offenbach were popular. Lyrical opera found its climax in the works of Jules Massenet. Carmen by Georges Bizet introduced realism into opera. In Austria Johann Strauss II wrote Viennese operettas, along with waltzes and polkas.

In France, Louis Théodore Gouvy built a stylistic bridge to German music. The operas, symphonies and chamber music works of the extremely versatile Camille Saint-Saëns were, as were the ballets of Léo Delibes, more traditional. Édouard Lalo and Emmanuel Chabrier were more progressive in their compositions. The Belgian-born César Franck began an organ music revival, which was continued by Charles-Marie Widor, Louis Vierne, and Charles Tournemire.

A specific national romanticism had by now emerged in almost all European countries. The Russian style started by Mikhail Glinka was continued by the "Group of Five": Mily Balakirev, Alexander Borodin, Modest Mussorgsky, Nikolai Rimsky-Korsakov, and César Cui. More western-oriented were Anton Rubinstein and Pyotr Ilyich Tchaikovsky, whose ballets and symphonies gained great popularity.

Bedřich Smetana is considered the father of Czech music with his operas and symphony poems in the progressive Liszt school. The symphonies, concerts and chamber music works of Antonín Dvořák are more in the style of Brahms. In Poland, Stanisław Moniuszko was the leading opera composer, in Hungary Ferenc Erkel. Norway produced its best-known composers with Edvard Grieg, creator of lyrical piano works, songs and orchestral works such as the Peer Gynt Suite. In England, the musically conservative symphonist Hubert Parry was popular, as well as were the comic operas of Arthur Sullivan.

=== Late Romantic ===
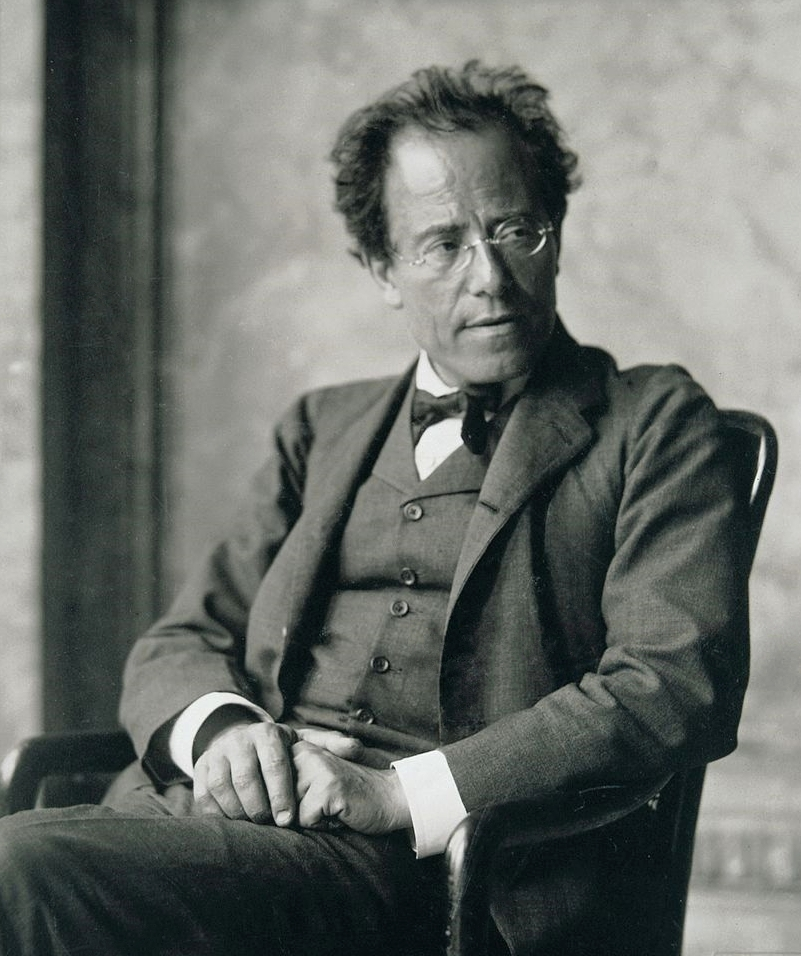
Gustav Mahler, photographed in 1907 by Moritz Nähr at the end of his period as director of the Vienna Hofoper

In late Romanticism, also called post-Romanticism, the traditional forms and elements of music were further dissolved. An increasingly colorful orchestral palette, an ever-increasing range of musical means, the spread of tonality to its limits, exaggerated emotions, and an increasingly individual tonal language of the individual composer were typical features; the music approaches modernism. The symphonies of Gustav Mahler were particularly progressive and often used the human voice.

Often present is the expressiveness of the Fin de siècle. This psychological expressiveness is also contained in the songs of Hugo Wolf, which are miniature dramas for voice and piano. More committed to tradition, particularly oriented towards Bruckner, are the symphonies of Franz Schmidt and Richard Wetz. Max Reger made use of fugues inspired by Bach in his numerous instrumental works, but developed them harmoniously extremely boldly.

Among the numerous composers after Reger, Julius Weismann and Joseph Haas stand out. Among the important composers of the late Romantic period is the idiosyncratic Hans Pfitzner. Although a traditionalist and decisive opponent of modern currents, quite a few of his works are close to the musical progress of the time. His successors include Walter Braunfels, primarily known as an opera composer, and the symphonist Wilhelm Furtwängler.

The opera stage was particularly suitable for increased emotions. The folk and fairy tale operas of Engelbert Humperdinck, Wilhelm Kienzl and Siegfried Wagner, the son of Richard Wagner, were deeply emotional. Eugen d'Albert and Max von Schillings presented a German variant of verismo.

Erotic symbolism can be found in the stage works of Alexander von Zemlinsky and Franz Schreker. Richard Strauss went even further to the limits of tonality with Salome and Elektra before he took more traditional paths with Der Rosenkavalier. In the style related to the works of Strauss, the compositions of Emil von Reznicek and Paul Graener are shown.

In Italy, opera was still dominant. Verismo, an exaggerated realism that could easily turn striking and melodramatic on the opera stage, developed. Despite the extensive works of Ruggero Leoncavallo, Pietro Mascagni, Francesco Cilea, and Umberto Giordano, only a few of their works are still performed. Only Giacomo Puccini's work has been completely preserved in the repertoire of the opera houses, although he was also often accused of sentimentality.

Despite some veristic works, Ermanno Wolf-Ferrari was mainly considered a reviver of the opera buffa. Ferruccio Busoni, a defender of modern classicity living in Germany, left behind a rather conventional, little played work. Instrumental music found its place in Italian music again with Ottorino Respighi, who was influenced by Impressionism.

In the works of Claude Debussy, musical structures dissolved into the finest nuances of rhythm, dynamics and timbre. Preludes to this development can be found in the work of Vincent d'Indy, Ernest Chausson and the songs and chamber music of Gabriel Fauré. Many subsequent French composers were influenced by Impressionism. One of the most important among them was Maurice Ravel, a brilliant orchestral virtuoso.

Albert Roussel first processed exotic topics before he anticipated Neoclassical tendencies like Ravel. Gabriel Pierné, Paul Dukas, Charles Koechlin, and Florent Schmitt also dealt with symbolic and exotic or oriental themes. Erik Satie's music moved away from Impressionism wrote piano pieces and was highly influential. Nevertheless, Impressionism is often considered part of modern music, if not seen as its own era. Hubert Parry and the Irishman Charles Villiers Stanford initiated late Romanticism in England, which had its first important representative in Edward Elgar. Frederick Delius revived the oratorio and wrote symphonies and concerts, but primarily devoted himself to small orchestral images in his own variant of Impressionism.

Ethel Smyth wrote mainly operas and chamber music in a style that reminded Brahms. Ralph Vaughan Williams, whose works were inspired by English folk songs and Renaissance music, became the most important symphonist of his country. Gustav Holst incorporated Greek mythology and Indian philosophy into his work. Havergal Brian and Frank Bridge were idiiosyncratic composers during the transition to modernity.

In Russia, Alexander Glazunov decorated his traditional composition technique with a colorful orchestral palette. The mystic Alexander Scriabin dreamed of a synthesis of colors, sound and scents. Sergei Rachmaninov wrote melancholic-pathetic piano pieces and concertos full of intoxicating virtuosity, while the piano works of Nikolai Medtner are more lyrical.

In the Czech Republic, Leoš Janáček, deeply rooted in the music of his Moravian homeland, found new areas of expression by using "speech melodies" of spoken language in his operas. Local sounds are also unmistakable in the music of Zdeněk Fibich, Josef Bohuslav Foerster, Vítězslav Novák, and Josef Suk. There is a slightly morbid exoticism and later classicist style in the work of the Polish Karol Szymanowski.

The most important Danish composer is Carl Nielsen, known for symphonies and concerts. Even more dominant in his country is the Finnish composer Jean Sibelius, also a symphonist of melancholy expressiveness and clear line design. In Sweden, the works of Wilhelm Peterson-Berger, Wilhelm Stenhammar, and Hugo Alfvén show a typical Nordic conservatism, and the Norwegian Christian Sinding also composed traditionally.

Spanish music became more popular, first in the piano works of Isaac Albéniz and Enrique Granados, then in the operas, ballets and orchestral works of Manuel de Falla, influenced by Impressionism.

The first important representatives of the United States also appeared with Edward MacDowell and Amy Beach. The work of Charles Ives belonged only partly to late Romanticism - much of it was already radically modern and pointed far into the 20th century.

== Schools ==
=== New German School ===
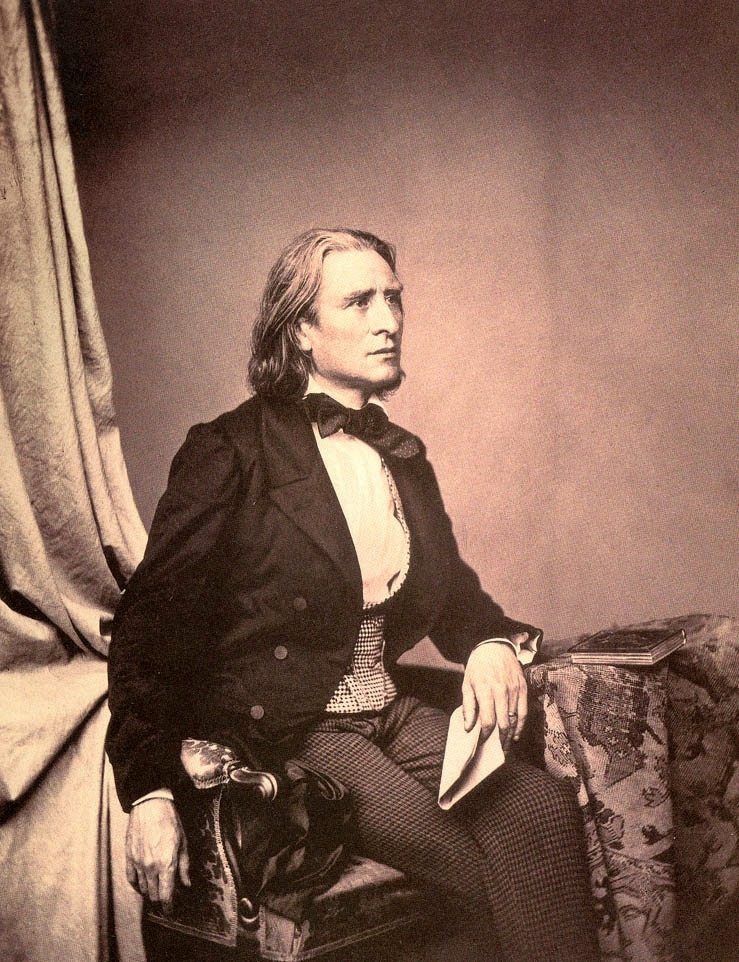
Franz Liszt in 1858, by Franz Hanfstaengl

The New German School was a loose collection of composers and critics informally led by Franz Liszt and Richard Wagner who strove for pushing the limits of chromatic harmony and program music as opposed to absolute music which they believed had reached its limit under Ludwig van Beethoven.

This group also pushed for the development and innovation of the symphonic poem, thematic transformation in musical form, and radical changes in tonality and harmony.

Other important members of this movement includes the critic Richard Pohl and composers Felix Draeseke, Julius Reubke, Karl Klindworth, William Mason, and Peter Cornelius.

=== The German Conservatives ===
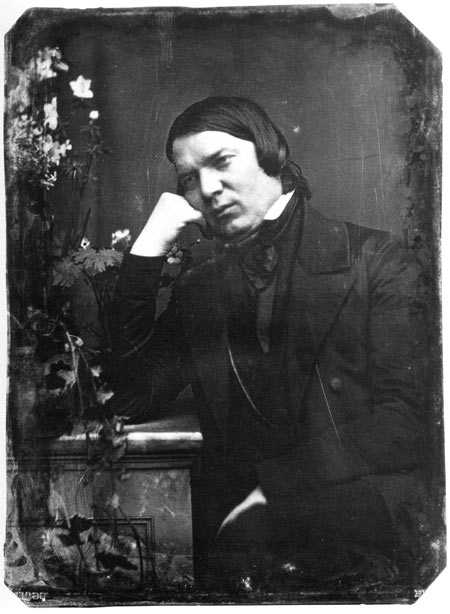
Robert Schumann in an 1850 daguerreotype

The conservatives were a broad group of musicians and critics who maintained the artistic legacy of Robert Schumann who adhered to composing and promoting absolute music.

They believed in continuing along the footsteps of Ludwig van Beethoven of composing the symphony genre in the classical mold, though they would implement their own musical language.

The most prominent members of this circle were Johannes Brahms, Joseph Joachim, Clara Schumann, and the Leipzig Conservatoire, which had been founded by Felix Mendelssohn.

=== The Mighty Five ===
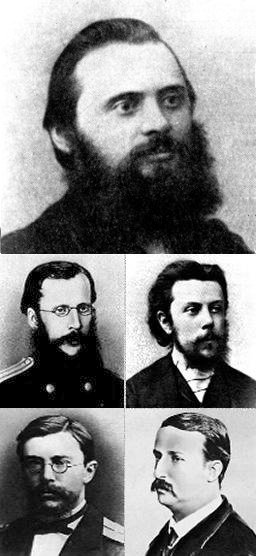
Balakirev (top), Cui (upper left), Mussorgsky (upper right), Rimsky-Korsakov (lower left), and Borodin (lower right).

The Mighty Five were a group of Russian composers centered in Saint Petersburg who collaborated with each other from 1856 to 1870 to create a distinctly Russian national style of classical music. They were often at odds with Pyotr Ilyich Tchaikovsky who favored a more Western approach to classical composition.

Led by Mily Balakirev the group's main members also consisted of César Cui, Modest Mussorgsky, Nikolai Rimsky-Korsakov and Alexander Borodin.

=== The Belyayev Circle ===
The Belyayev circle was a society of Russian musicians who met in Saint Petersburg from 1885 and 1908 who sought to continue the development of the national Russian style of classical music following in the footsteps of the Mighty Five although they were far more tolerant of the Western compositional style of Tchaikovsky.

This group was founded by Russian music publisher philanthropist Mitrofan Belyayev. The two most important composers of this group were Nikolai Rimsky-Korsakov and Alexander Glazunov. Members also included Vladimir Stasov, Anatoly Lyadov, Alexander Ossovsky, Witold Maliszewski, Nikolai Tcherepnin, Nikolay Sokolov, and Alexander Winkler.

== Transition to Modernism ==
During the later half of the 19th Century, some prominent composers began exploring the limits of the traditional tonal system. Important examples include Tristan und Isolde by Richard Wagner and Bagatelle sans tonalité by Franz Liszt. This limit was finally reached during the Late Romantic period where progressive tonality is demonstrated in the works of composers such as Gustav Mahler, and the early works of Arnold Schoenberg and Anton Webern. With these developments, Romanticism finally began to break apart into several new parallel movements forming in response, bringing way to Modernism.

Some notable movements to form in response to Romanticism's collapse include Expressionism with Arnold Schoenberg and the Second Viennese School being its main promoters and Primitivism with Igor Stravinsky being its most influential composer.

== Genres ==
=== Symphony ===
Carried to the highest degree by Ludwig van Beethoven, the symphony becomes the most prestigious form to which many composers devote themselves. The most conservative respect to the Beethovenian model includes composers such as Franz Schubert, Felix Mendelssohn, Robert Schumann, Camille Saint-Saëns, and Johannes Brahms. Others show an imagination that makes them go beyond this framework, in form or in the spirit: the most daring of them being Hector Berlioz.

Finally, some will also tell a story throughout their symphonies; like Franz Liszt, they will create the symphonic poem, a new musical genre, usually composed of a single movement and inspired by a theme, character or literary text. Since the symphonic poem is articulated around a leitmotiv (musical motif to identify a character, the hero for example), it is to be compared to music with a symphonic program.

=== Lied ===
This musical genre appeared with the evolution from pianoforte to piano during the romantic period. The lied is vocal music most often accompanied by this instrument. The singing is taken from romantic poems and this style makes it possible to bring the voice as close to feelings as possible. One of the first and most famous lieder composers is Franz Schubert, with Erlkönig, however, many other romantic composers have devoted themselves to the lied genre such as Saint-Saëns, Duparc, Robert Schumann, Johannes Brahms, Hugo Wolf, Gustav Mahler, and Richard Strauss.

=== Concerto ===
It is Beethoven who inaugurates the romantic concerto, with his five piano concertos (especially the fifth) and his violin concerto where many characteristics of classicism can still be recognized. His example is followed by many composers: the concerto rivals the symphony in the repertoire of major orchestral formations.

Finally, the concerto will allow instrumentalist composers to reveal their virtuosity, such as Niccolò Paganini on the violin, and Frédéric Chopin, Robert Schumann, and Franz Liszt on the piano.

=== Rhapsody ===
A rhapsody in music is a one-movement work that is episodic yet integrated, free-flowing in structure, featuring a range of highly contrasted moods, colour, and tonality. An air of spontaneous inspiration and a sense of improvisation make it freer in form than a set of variations.The most famous ones are the 'Hungarian Rhapsodies' by Franz Liszt, particularly 'no. 2' .

=== Nocturne ===
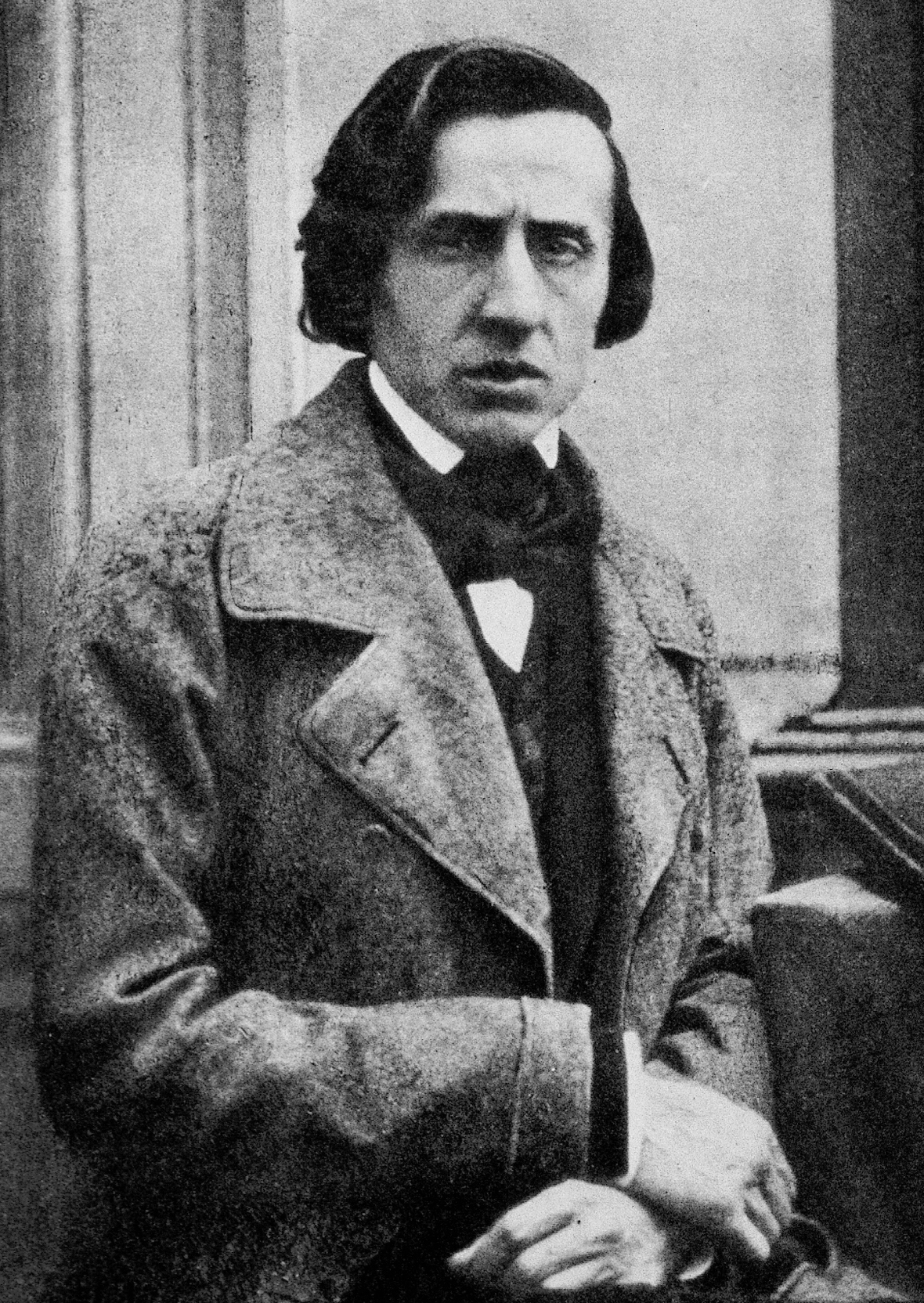
Daguerreotype of Chopin, c. 1849

The nocturne is presented as a short-lived confidential piece, which the Irish composer John Field was one of the first to cultivate. Immersed in the climate of the night, an atmosphere privileged by romantics, it is often of ABA structure, with a very flexible and ornate melody, accompanied by a left hand with undulating arpeggios. The tempo is usually slow, and the central part is often more agitated.

Frédéric Chopin has set the most famous form of the nocturnes. He wrote 21, from 1827 to 1846. First published in series of three (opus 9 and 15), they are then grouped in pairs (opus 27, 32, 37, 48, 55, 62).

=== Ballet ===
The Romantic ballet was developed throughout the 19th century, especially by composers such as Pyotr Ilyich Tchaikovsky in Russia and Léo Delibes in France. An example is The Nutcracker and Swan Lake by Tchaikovsky and Coppelia by Delibes

=== Opera ===
==== France ====
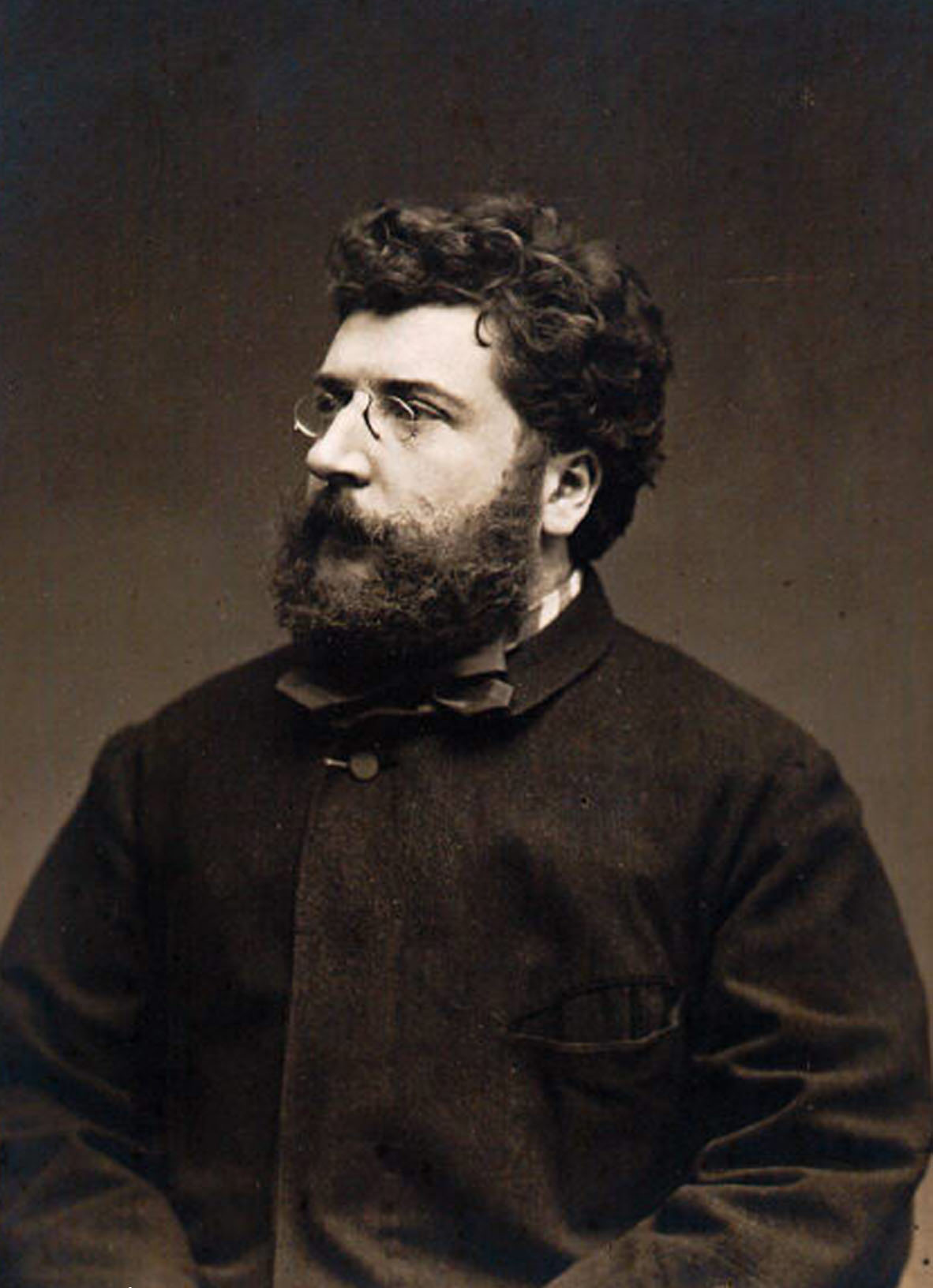
Bizet photographed by Étienne Carjat (1875)

During the 19th century, romanticism took a hold of opera and it was Paris that became one of its main centers. Most romantic operas were composed by composers living in France, such as Luigi Cherubini, Gaspare Spontini, François-Adrien Boieldieu, and Daniel-François-Esprit Auber. The apogee of the style of great operas is marked by the works of Giacomo Meyerbeer. Hector Berlioz's Les Troyens was first ignored, Benvenuto Cellini is consputed during the premiere, while Charles Gounod's Faust is one of the most popular French operas of the mid-19th century.

During the second part of the 19th century, Georges Bizet will revolutionize opera with Carmen: "local color based on the use of Spanish songs and dances" according to Nietzsche, it is "a ray of Mediterranean light dissipating the fog of the Wagnerian ideal". Interest in "local color" works is confirmed with Lakmé by Léo Delibes, and Samson and Dalila by Camille Saint-Saëns. The most productive French composer of operas of the last part of the century was Jules Massenet composing works such as Manon, Werther, and Thaïs.

Jacques Offenbach, who composed Les Contes d'Hoffmann, established himself as the master of French opera-comique of the 19th century, inventing a new genre, the French opéra bouffe, which later was confused with the operetta.

At the beginning of the 20th century, romanticism in France was gradually abandoned in favor of other currents such as Impressionism or symbolism, carried in particular by Claude Debussy's Pelléas and Mélisande (1902).

==== Germany ====
Carl Maria von Weber, with Der Freischütz (1821) creates the first German romantic opera; the first important opera being Beethoven's Fidelio (1805), the only operatic work of this composer.

Richard Wagner, from the Der fliegende Holländer, introduces the leitmotiv and the "cyclical melody" process. He revolutionizes opera by duration and instrumental power. His major work, Tetralogy is one of the summits of German opera. He creates the "musical drama" in which the orchestra now becomes the protagonist in the same way as the characters. In 1876, the Bayreuth Festival was created dedicated to the exclusive representation of Wagner's works.

Wagner's influence continues in virtually all operas, even in Hänsel und Gretel by Engelbert Humperdinck. The dominant figure is then Richard Strauss, who uses orchestration and vocal techniques similar to those of Wagner in Salome and Elektra while developing his own path. Der Rosenkavalier is the work of Strauss that had the most flamboyant success at the time.

==== Italy ====
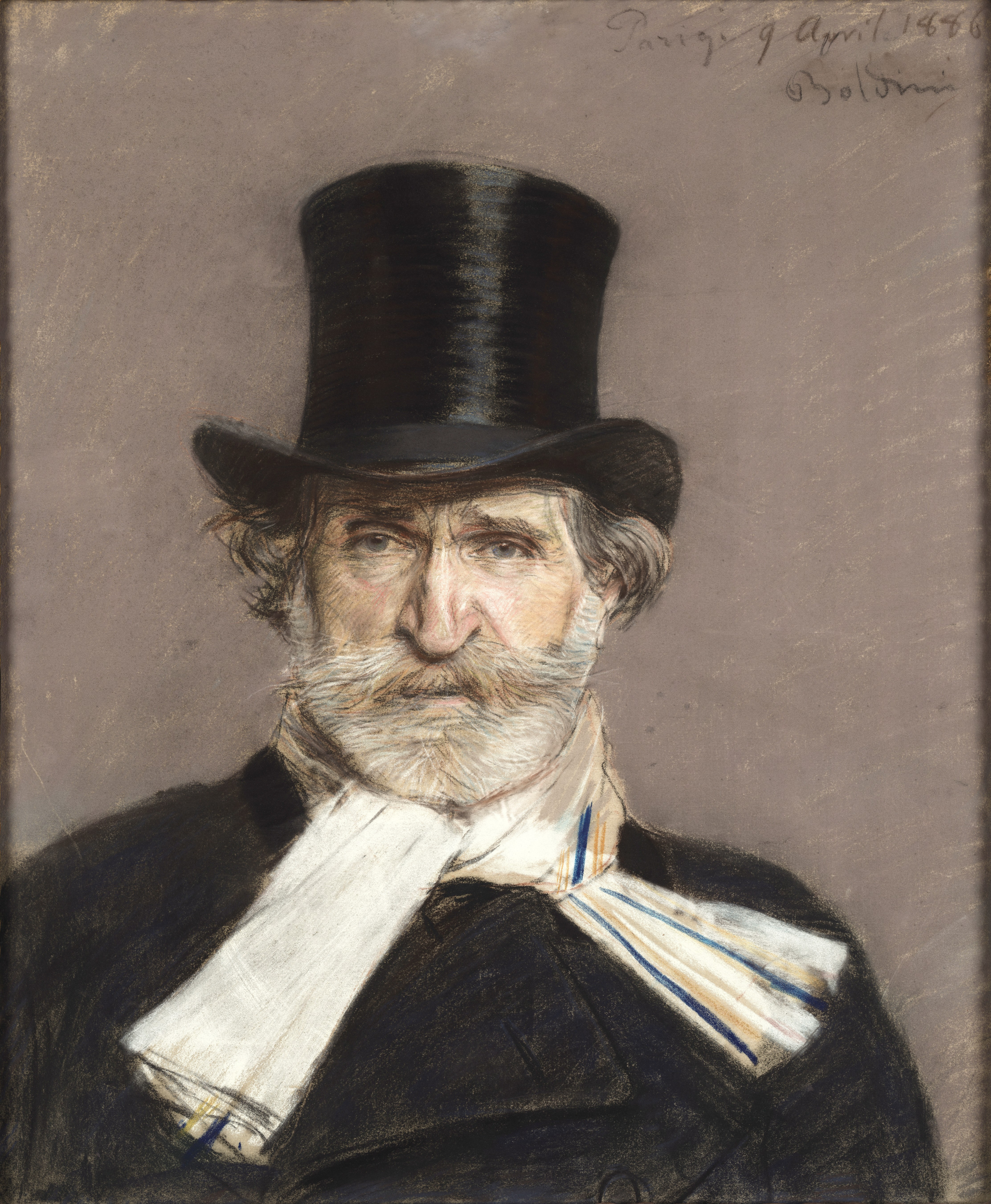
The iconic Portrait of Giuseppe Verdi (1886) by Giovanni Boldini

Italian romanticism begins with Gioachino Rossini who composed works such as The Barber of Seville and La Cenerentola. He created the "bel canto" style, a style adopted by his contemporaries Vincenzo Bellini and Gaetano Donizetti.

However, the face of Italian opera is Giuseppe Verdi whose Nabucco's slave choir is a very important hymn to all of Italy. The trilogy formed by Rigoletto, Il trovatore and La traviata are among his major works but he reaches the peak of his art with Otello and Falstaff at the end of his career. He has infuled his works with unparalleled dramatic vigour and rhythmic vitality.

In the second part of the 19th century, Giacomo Puccini, Verdi's undisputed successor, transcends realism into verism. La Bohème, Tosca, Madame Butterfly, and Turandot are melodic operas loaded with emotion.

==== Other countries ====
Other works of national inspiration:

- In Russia, a national school is developing with Mikhail Glinka who composed A Life for the Tsar, Ruslan and Ludmila. Other great Russian works: Sadko by Nikolai Rimsky-Korsakov, Prince Igor by Alexander Borodin, Boris Godunov by Modest Mussorgsky, Eugene Onegin and The Queen of Spades by Pyotr Ilich Tchaikovsky.
- In the Czech Republic, the national spirit is embodied by The Bartered Bride of Bedřich Smetana, Rusalka of Antonín Dvořák, Šárka of Zdeněk Fibich, and Jenůfa of Leoš Janáček.
- In Great Britain, Michael William Balfe, who composed The Bohemian Girl, the British romantic opera par excellence. He also composes for the French scene.

== See also ==
- History of music
- List of Romantic-era composers
- Neoromanticism (music)
