= Giovacchino =

Giovacchino (pronounced [dʒovakˈkiːno]) is a masculine Italian given name, a less common variant of Gioacchino (Joachim). Notable people with the name include:

- Giovacchino Cantini (c. 1780–1844), Italian engraver
- Giovacchino Forzano (1884–1970), Italian playwright, librettist and director
- Giovacchino Rossini (1792–1868), Italian composer

== See also ==
- Gioachino
