= Giachino =

Giachino is an Italian surname, derived from the given name Gioachino. Notable people with the surname include:

- Jean-Paul Giachino (born 1963), French biathlete
- Pedro Giachino (1947–1982), Argentine Navy officer
- Pietro Giachino (born 1995), Norwegian gymnast

== See also ==
- Giacchino
