= Igino Benvenuto Supino =

Italian painter

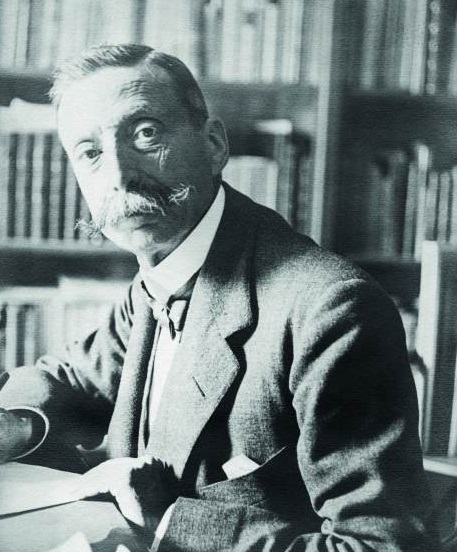
Igino Benvenuto Supino

Igino Benvenuto Supino (29 September 1858 – 4 July 1940) was an Italian painter, art critic, and historian.

== Biography ==
Igino was born to a prominent and erudite Jewish family of Pisa; his father, Moises, was a collector of medieval seals, coins and medals, who donated his collection to the Museum of Pisa.

After his lyceum education, he first studied first under the professor Alessandro Lanfredini in Pisa, then in 1883 at the Academy of Fine Arts of Florence, under professor Antonio Ciseri. At the Academy, Igino met the painters of the Macchiaioli movement, and developed close friendships with Fattori and Signorini, who appreciate his first paintings, displayed at Florentine exhibitions between 1885 and 1889. He also befriended Vittorio Matteo Corcos, a Symbolist painter.

In 1885, he exhibited for the first time at the Società d'incoraggiamento of that city, two paintings: Interior of the Pitti Gallery and the other a genre painting titled Primi voti. The next year at the same Exposition he sent Le gramignaie, Al terrazzo, and In giardino. In Bologna he exhibited Mattino d'estate in 1888, and Study of Reality in 1889. At the 1889 Promotrice of Florence he exhibited In Church, In Spring, Prima comunione, Dopo colazione, La convalescente, and Three Rabbis at the Temple.

Over the years, Igino gravitated towards learning about art history and in 1886 attended lectures by Pasquale Villari and Alessandro d'Ancona at the Istituto di Studi Superiori of Florence. He became attached to the use of scientific principles, or the theory of Positivism, in the study of Arts. His scholarly temperament induced him to dedicate himself to the art history rather than painting.

During 1888–1889, he met with Adolfo Venturi in Rome, and contributed to a number of works of art criticism. In 1891, he returned to Pisa to study medieval and ancient monuments for the Museo Civico, inaugurated two years later. He was named Inspector of Monuments of Pisa. He published his first articles about the Tuscan artists – Giovanni Pisano, Tino di Camaino, and Giambologna, among others – in the journal "Archivio Storico dell’Arte" founded by Adolfo Venturi.

In 1896, he was named Inspector for the Museo Nazionale del Bargello. For the next ten years he catalogued and researched the collections. In 1904 he was named Director of the Bargello, and commissioned as Associate Superintendent of the Florentine Galleries. He taught at the Istituto di Studi Superiori e pubblica, and published a number of monographs with photographs, including, among others, on Beato Angelico, Filippo Lippi, Botticelli, and Benvenuto Cellini. He worked in this regard with the Alinari brothers.

In 1906 he gained the professorship of History of Art at the University of Bologna, and moved there with his family. He taught there for nearly thirty years. His main interest was art and architecture of Bologna. Among his supporters was Giovanni Pascoli. He retired in 1933, and was replaced at his position by Roberto Longhi, but remained as Honorary Professor of the Istituto which he had helped found in Bologna.

In 1938, with the imposition of the fascist racial laws, he was forced to retire. Living alone on his house on via Dante, he prepared his last volume on the art of the Churches of Bologna, where he died before completing the work.

== Works ==
- Supino, Igino Benvenuto (1896). Fratelli Alinari (ed.). Il Camposanto di Pisa. Florence: Tipografia di G. Barbera.
- Supino, Igino Benvenuto (1895). Giovanni Pisani. Vol. Extract from Archivio Storico Dell'Arte, Series II, Year I, fasc. i-II. Rome: Tipografia dell'Unione Cooperative Editrice.
- Supino, Igino Benvenuto (1908). Alfani; Venturi (eds.). I ricordi di Alessandro Allori. Florence: Tipografia Barbera, Alfani e Venturi Proprietari.
- Supino, Igino Benvenuto (1902). Fra Angelico. Florence: Fratelli Alinari.
- Supino, Igino Benvenuto (1900). Sandro Botticelli. Florence: Tipografia Barbera.
- Supino, Igino Benvenuto (1906). Fratelli Alinari (ed.). Gli albori dell'arte fiorentina. Florence.
- Supino, Igino Benvenuto (1932). L'arte nelle chiese di Bologna, Secoli VII-XIV. Bologna: Arnaldo Forni.
- Jacopo Dalla Quercia. Florence. 1926.
- Pisa. Florence. 1905.
- Beato Angelico. Florence. 1900.
- Arte Pisana. Florence. 1904.
- Giotto. 1920.
- Fra Filippo Lippi. Florence. 1902.
- Il Portico dei Servi. 1927.
- Cellino di Nese. 1895.
- La Basilica di San Francesco D'Assisi. 1924.
- Il Pergamo di Giovanni Pisano nel Duomo di Pisa. 1892.
- Le Porte del Duomo di Pisa. 1899.
- Alfonso Rubbiani. 1914.
- Niccolo Pisano, pittore. 1916.
- Catalogo del Museo Civico di Pisa. 1894.
- Assisi nell'opera di Antonio Discovolo. 1926.
- Le sculture delle porte di San Petronio in Bologna. 1914.
- Il Medagliere Mediceo nel Real Museo Nazionale di Firenze. 1899.
