= Giacchino =

Giacchino is an Italian surname, derived from the given name Gioacchino. Notable people with the surname include:

- Anthony Giacchino (born 1969), American documentary filmmaker
- Michael Giacchino (born 1967), American composer of music for films, television, and video games
- Mick Giacchino, American composer of music for films and television

== See also ==
- Giachino
