= Gioachino =

Gioachino (pronounced [dʒoaˈkiːno]) is a masculine Italian given name, a less common variant of Gioacchino (Joachim). Notable people with the name include:

- Giuseppe Gioachino Belli (1791–1863), Italian poet
- Gioachino Greco (c. 1600–1634), Italian chess player
- Gioachino Rossini (1792–1868), Italian composer

== See also ==
- Giachino
- Giovacchino
