= Santi Gioacchino e Anna ai Monti =

Church in Rome

- Church of Saints Joachim and Anne on the Hills
- Chiesa di Santi Gioacchino e Anna ai Monti
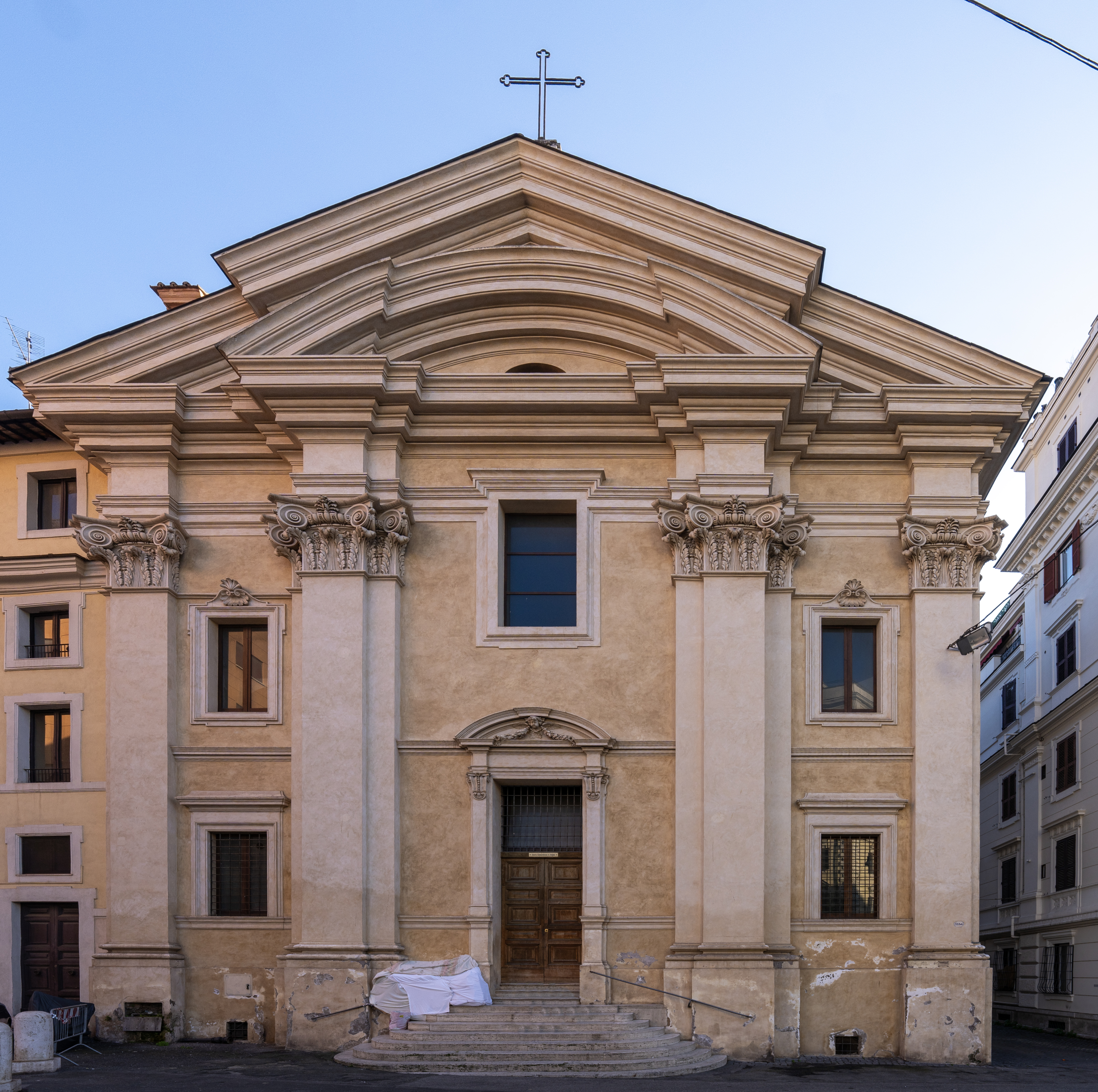

- Location within Rome Location within Rome
- 41°53′40″N 12°29′38″E
- Location: Via di Monte Polacco 5, Rome
- Country: Italy
- Language: Italian
- Denomination: Catholic
- Tradition: Roman Rite

History
- Status: church
- Dedication: Joachim and Saint Anne
- Dedicated: 1781

Administration
- Diocese: Rome

Santi Gioacchino ed Anna ai Monti ('Saints Joachim and Anne on the Hills') is a church on the Via Monte Polacco in Rome.

Pope Clement XIII demolished the Minim monastery in 1760 to build the current edifice. The church's architecture is formed on a Greek cross plan, with a central dome. In 1781, Pope Pius VI himself consecrated the church building. Its façade has four pilasters with Corinthian capitals. The high altar has a painting of the Madonna, with her parents, St Anne and St Joachim.
