= Portrait of Giuseppe Verdi =

Painting by Giovanni Boldini

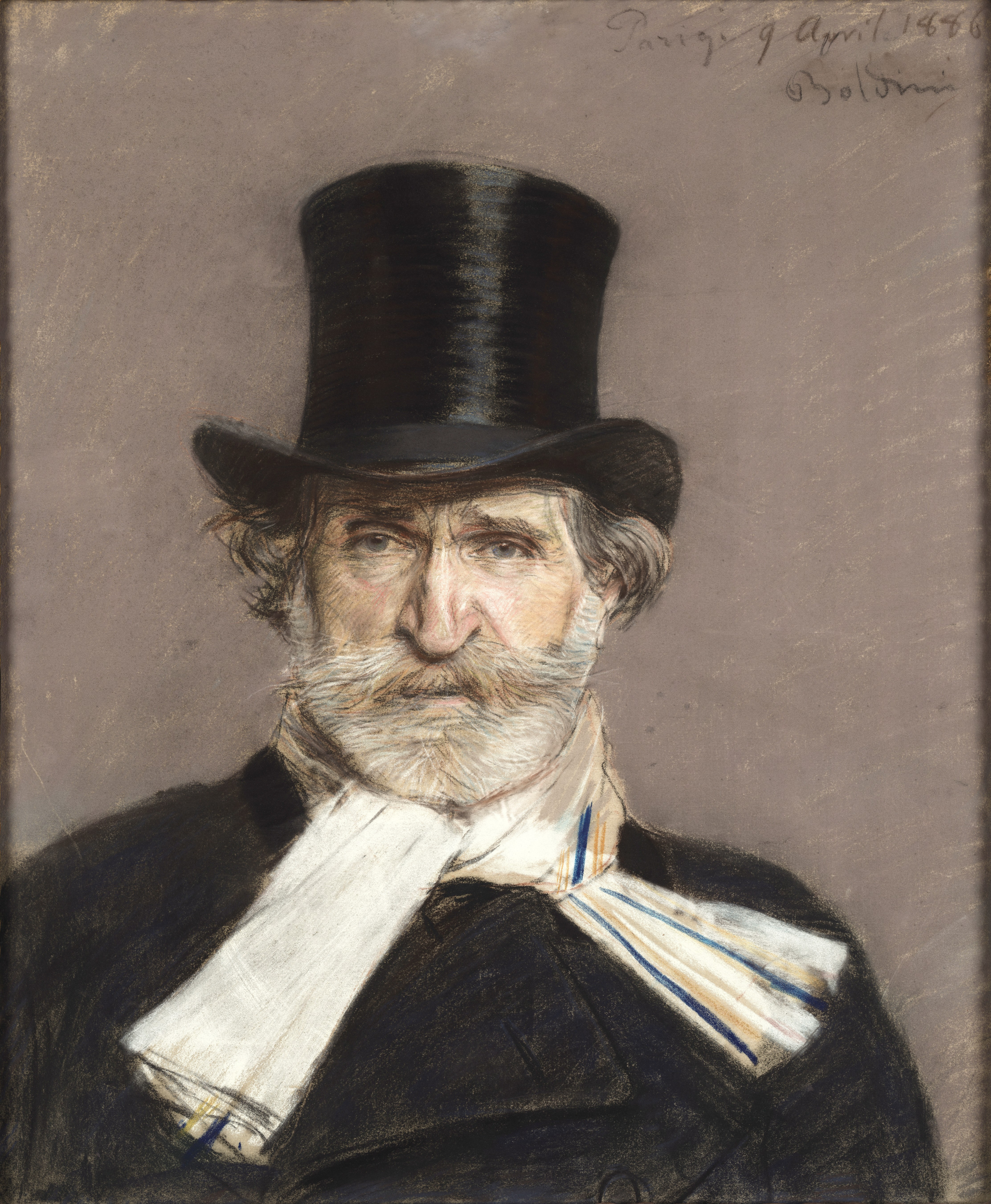
- Artist: Giovanni Boldini
- Year: 1886
- Medium: pastel
- Dimensions: 65 cm × 54 cm (26 in × 21 in)
- Location: Galleria Nazionale d'Arte Moderna, Rome

Portrait of Giuseppe Verdi is an 1886 pastel portrait of Giuseppe Verdi by the Italian artist Giovanni Boldini, now in the Galleria Nazionale d'Arte Moderna, in Rome.

== History ==
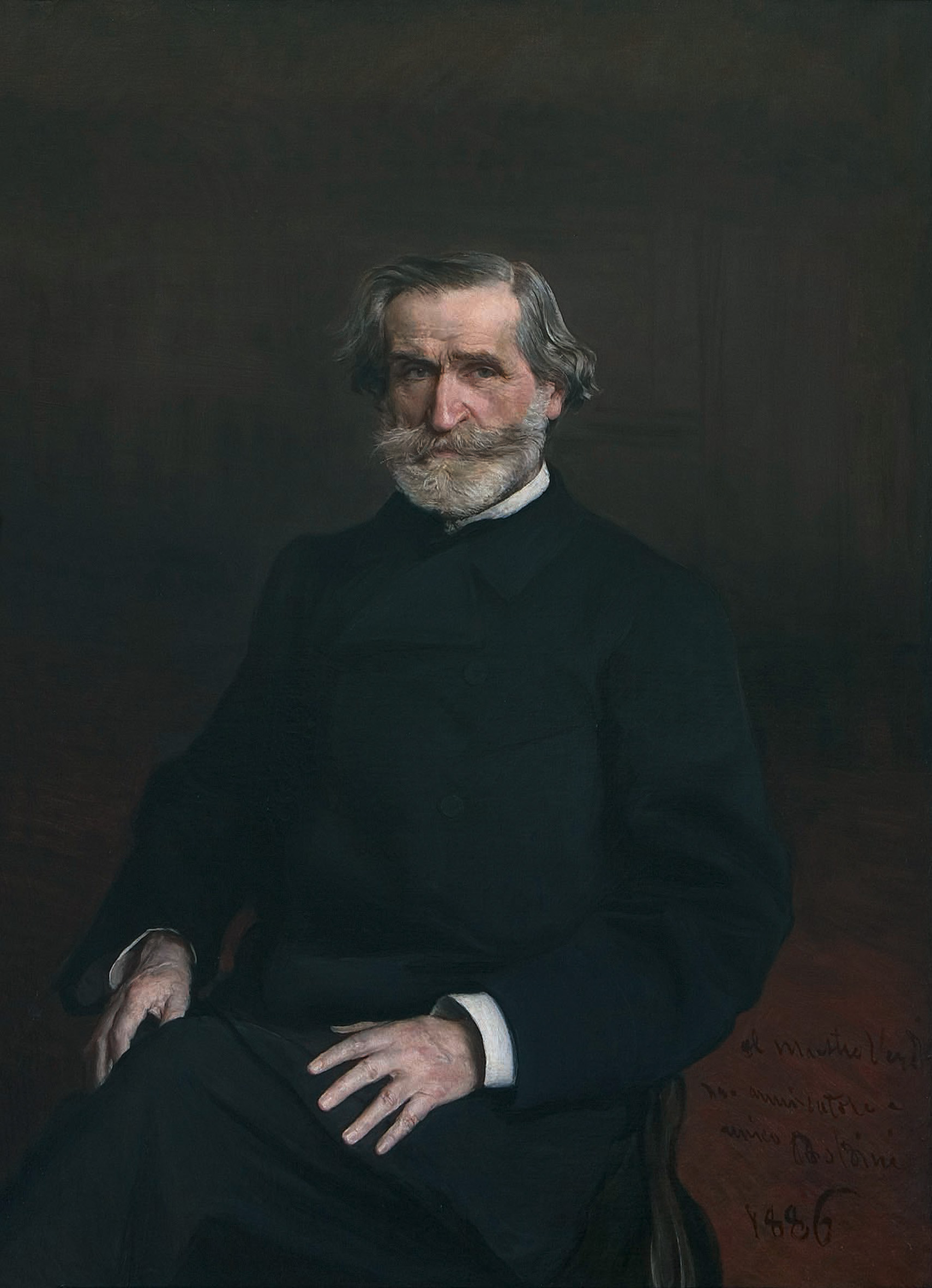
Boldini's first portrait of Verdi (1886), now in the Casa di Riposo per Musicisti in Milan

In March 1886, Verdi was in Paris to hear on stage Victor Maurel, the baritone approached for the role of Iago in Verdi's opera Otello. Boldini was one of Emanuele Muzio's best friends, who had long dreamed of seeing his master pose for the painter. This was done during a visit by Verdi accompanied by Muzio and Giuseppina Strepponi to the Pigalle workshop during which Boldini made a first portrait after a series of long poses. The oil on canvas, hung on the wall of the living room of the Doria Palace, the Winter residence of the Verdi couple in Genoa, is now kept in the Casa di Riposo per Musicisti in Milan.

Dissatisfied with the result, Boldini remade the portrait of Verdi on 9 April 1886, using the pastel technique, in just five hours. The painter first kept this portrait to present it at the Exposition Universelle of 1889 in Paris, in Brussels in 1897, and at the first Venice Biennale in 1895, to finally give it to the National Gallery of Modern and Contemporary Art in Rome in 1918.

== See also ==
- List of works by Giovanni Boldini
