= Gioacchino Prati =

Italian revolutionary

Gioacchino Prati (1790–1863) was an Italian revolutionary and patriot, a supporter of the Risorgimento who was exiled for his activities in 1821. He was later a Saint-Simonian.

== Life ==
Prati was born in Tenno, County of Tyrol and educated in Salzburg, Innsbruck, Vienna and Landshut. He trained in both medicine and in law, taking his law degree in Pavia in 1810. He moved to Milan to continue his studies where he became a Freemason and a Carbonaro. He practised law in Brescia and Trento but his clandestine activities came to the attention of the authorities and he fled to the safety of Switzerland in 1816. There he continued his political agitation, largely based in Chur and Yverdon.

He travelled throughout Europe, maintaining his revolutionary activism, before being granted right of asylum in England in 1823. There, he soon established a broad circle of exiled and radical friends including: Ugo Foscolo, Sir John Bowring, Thomas Campbell, Joseph Henry Green and Edward Craven Hawtrey. Though he claims that Bowring had introduced him to write for the Westminster Review, he managed a meagre living on various failed educational enterprises, and publishing on educational matters and tutoring in German. He was imprisoned for debt in 1829 and took the opportunity to learn English medical terminology under the guidance of Green.

On his release from prison in 1830, he visited Philippe Buonarroti, an old friend, in Brussels then, after a brief return to England, rushed to France to join in the July Revolution.

Returning to England in 1831 he joined the Friends of the People Society and professed to be a Saint-Simonian. He then took up the practice of medicine, contributing a medical column to the radical Penny Satirist from 1837 to 1840, in addition to editing the magazine.

There was some public alarm at his radical views when he was joined in some public professions of his views by Gregorio Fontana in 1834.

He repeatedly petitioned the Austrian authorities of the Kingdom of Lombardy–Venetia to allow him to return to Brescia and they relented in 1852. Prati died in Brescia.

== Sources ==
- Fisch, M. H. (1943). "The Coleridges, Dr. Prati, and Vico". Modern Philology. 41 (2): 111–122. doi:10.1086/388609. S2CID 161911050.
- Hainds, J. R. (1946). "John Stuart Mill and the Saint Simonians". Journal of the History of Ideas. 7 (1). University of Pennsylvania Press: 103–112. doi:10.2307/2707272. JSTOR 2707272.
- Prati, G. (1837–39) "Autobiography", Penny Satirist, reprinted in Annuario dell’istituto storico italiano per l’età moderna e contemporanea, Vols. XVII–XVIII (1965–66) and XIX–XX (1967–68).
- Robson, A. P. & Robson, J. M. (eds) (1986) The Collected Works of John Stuart Mill, Volume XXIII - Newspaper Writings August 1831 – October 1834 Part II, Toronto: London: Routledge and Kegan Paul, "234. 'Fontana and Prati's St. Simonism in London', Examiner, 2 Feb., 1834, pp68–9"
- The Times, "St. Simonian Propagandism-Regeneration Of Woman", Wednesday 30 October 1833, p.3 col.F
- —, "Dr. Prati, 'Preacher of the St. Simonian religion in England,' delivered a lecture yesterday evening at the ...", Saturday 30 November 1833, p.2 col.D
- Jordan, Alexander, '“Be not a copy if thou canst be an original”: German philosophy, republican pedagogy, Benthamism and Saint-Simonism in the political thought of Gioacchino di Prati', in History of European Ideas, 41:2 (2015), pp. 221–240 doi:10.1080/01916599.2014.926104
