= Gioacchino Gamberini =

Italian painter

Gioacchino Gamberini (1859 – after 1904) was an Italian painter noted for genre painting as well as city and rural views.

He was born in Ravenna but died in Florence. He began his studies at the Academy of Fine Arts of Pisa, under the professor Lanfredini. This teacher guided him the Academy of Florence. In 1883, he was awarded a prize and came to study under Ciaranfi. In 1886, he exhibited the genre painting of La Quiete at the Promotrice of Florence. In 1889, the exhibited Bandita abbastanza. Other works, among them cityscapes and vedute, include: Mercato vecchio (1891); Coro di Santa Maria Novella a Firenze (1892, Turin); La svinatura (1891, Genoa); and Al pozzo, Vita tranquilla, and In montagna (2894. Milan).
