= Alessandro Lanfredini =

Italian painter (1826–1900)

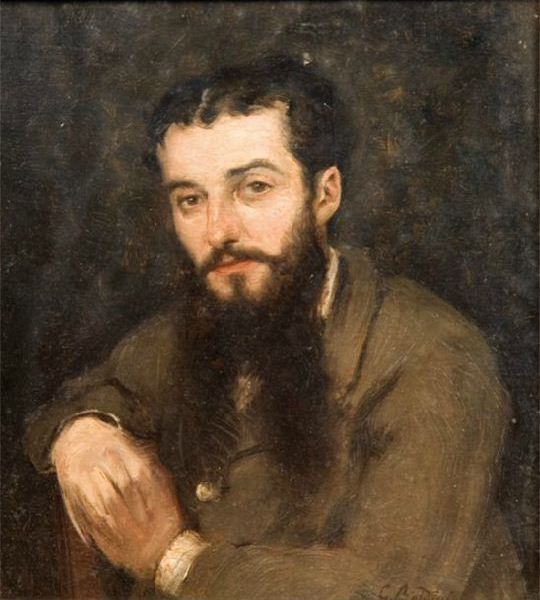

Alessandro Lanfredini (1 November 1826 – 19 May 1900) was an Italian painter of the Romantic period, mainly depicting genre scenes and events leading to Italian independence.

== Biography ==
He was born in Florence but died in Pisa. He was born to an iron artisan, and began his studies in 1838 at the Academy of Fine Arts of Florence, studying design and sculpture, but switching in 1847 to painting. He studied under Giuseppe Bezzuoli and then Enrico Pollastrini. In 1844–1850, he was awarded various prizes for designs.

He was an early participant in the artist meetings at the Caffè Michelangiolo in Florence. Telemaco Signorini described him as rather stern in his democratic Jacobin leanings. In 1848 he joined with various other idealistic artists such as Stefano Ussi, Silvestro Lega, Serafino De Tivoli, and Angiolo Tricca, in the Tuscan battalion that fought at the Battles of Curtatone and Montanara. Many of his later paintings would depict patriotic subjects from this turbulent time. In 1865, he was named director of the Accademia di belle arti of Pisa, and curator of the galleries in town. The academy, however, soon became a rather rigid patron of art. Lanfredini served on various commissions for the preservation of antiquities. He gained fame as a portraitist, for both locals and tourists. A portrait of Lanfredini by Giovanni Boldini is on display in the Grieco collection in Genoa.
