= Villa Florio =

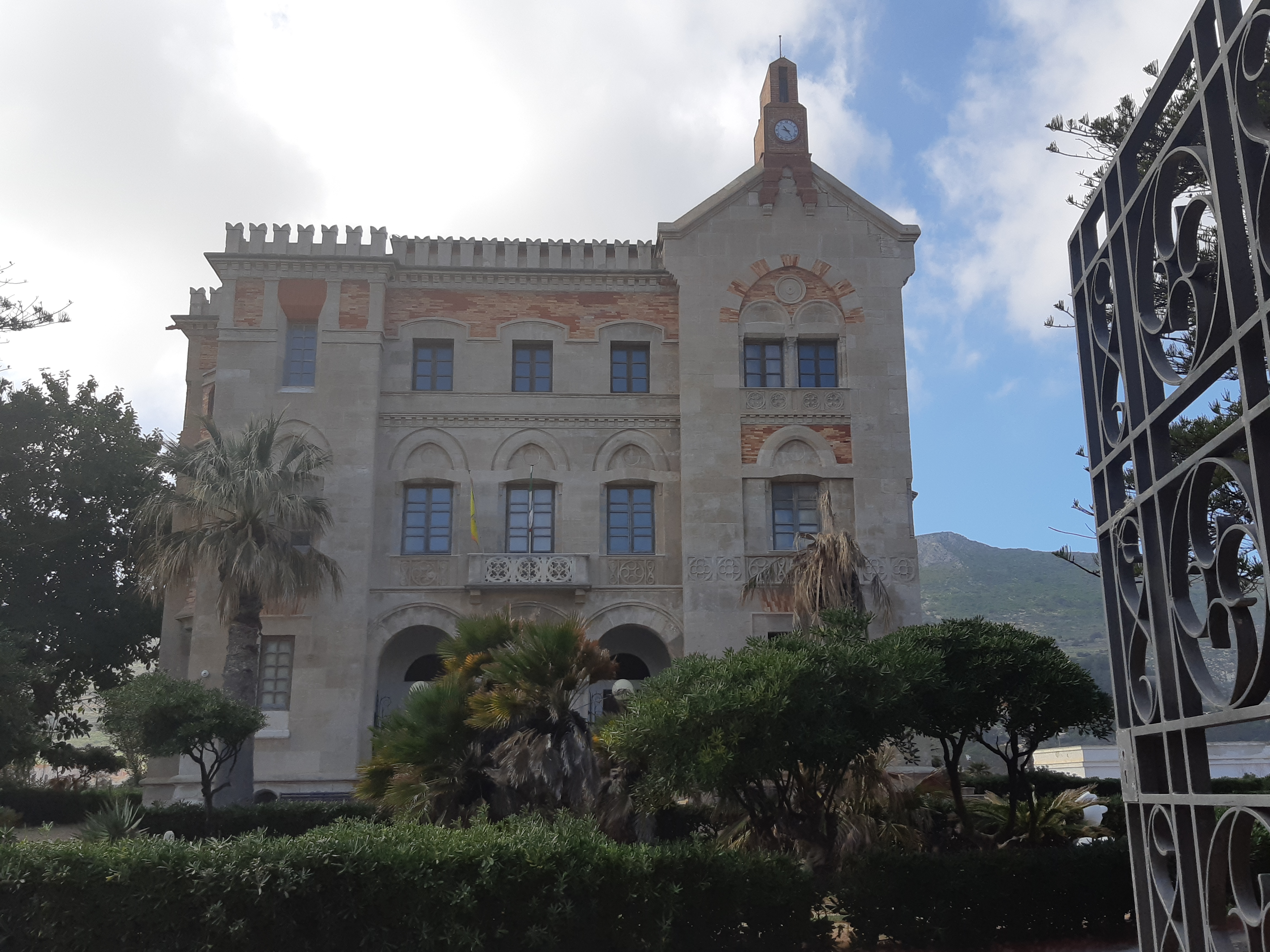
- Villa Florio in Favignana
- Click on the map for a fullscreen view

General information
- Location: Favignana, Italy
- Coordinates: 37°55′55.96″N 12°19′36.67″E

Villa Florio is a historic Neogothic villa located in Favignana, Italy. Designed by Palermo-based engineer Giuseppe Damiani Almeyda, it was commissioned by Ignazio Florio Sr. to become his family's residence in Favignana. It currently serves as a public building.

== Gallery ==
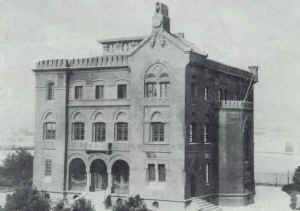

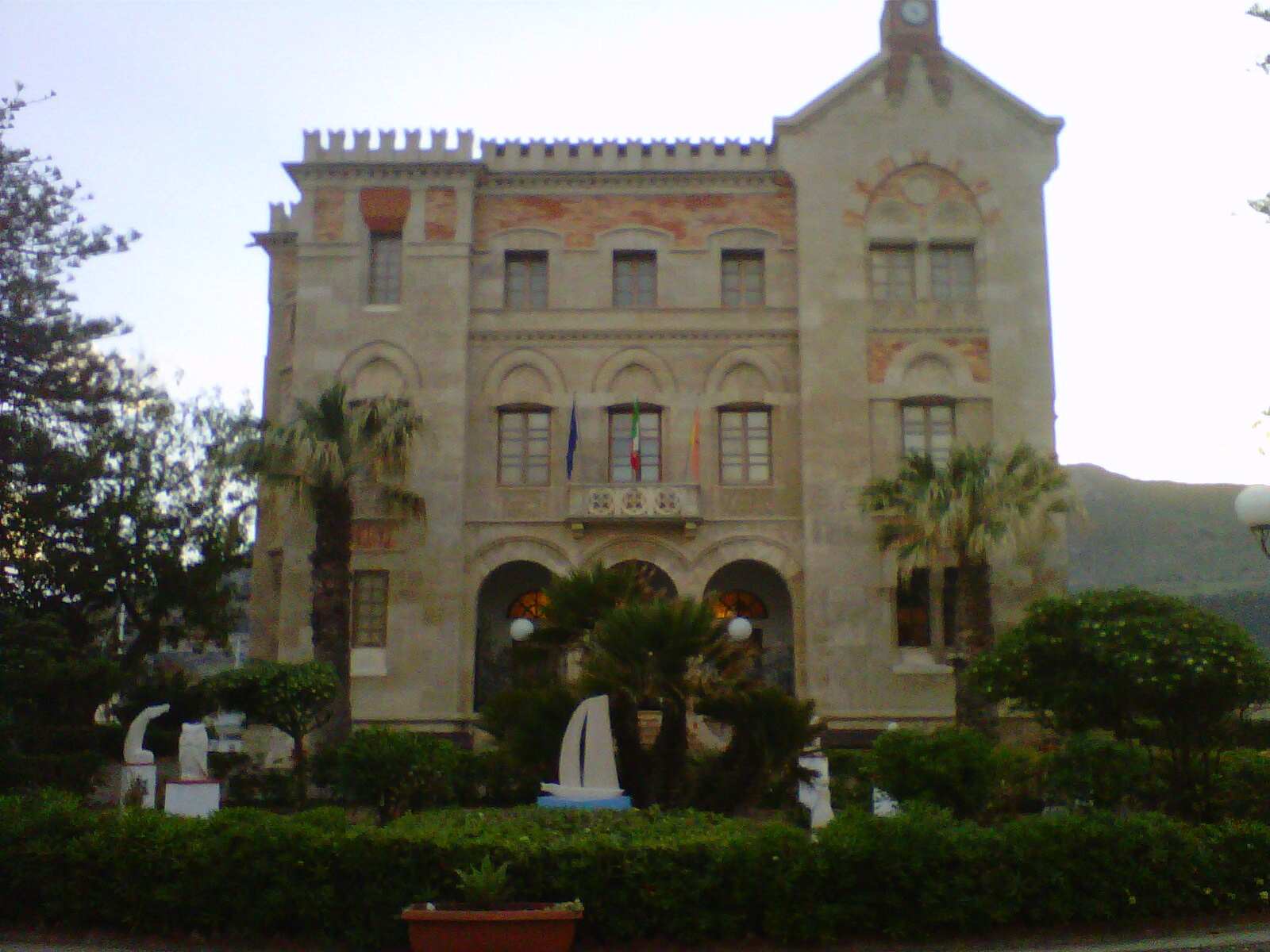

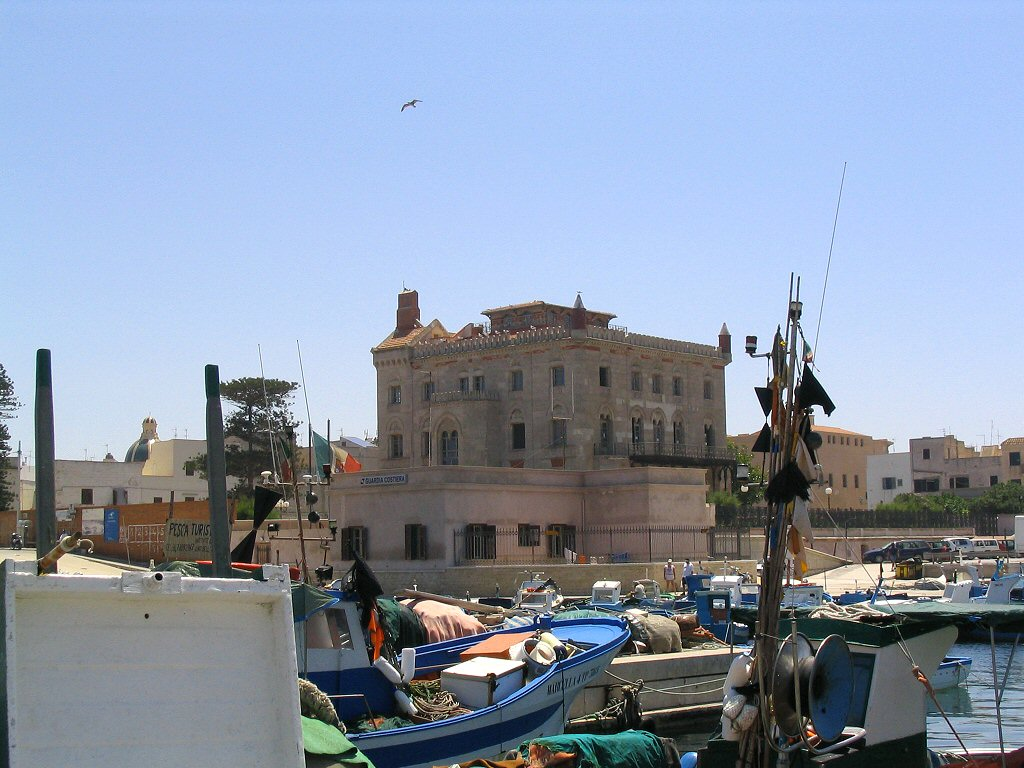
