= Moby Niki =

Ferry built in 1974

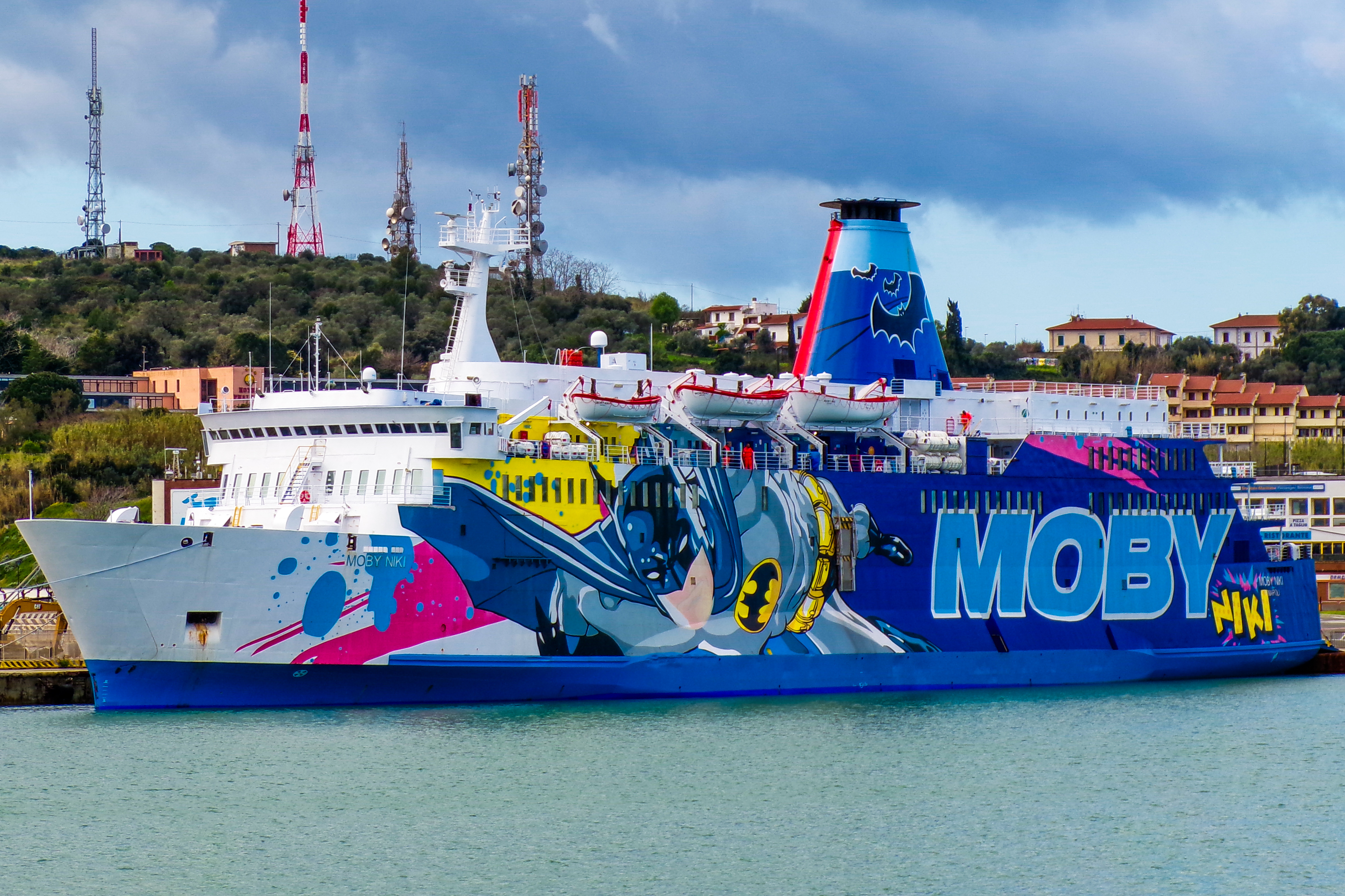
- Moby Niki in Piombino

History
- Name: (1974–1983): Europafärjan III; (1983–1999): Corsica Serena II; (1999–2011): Corsica Serena Seconda; (2011–2016): European Voyager; (2016–present): Moby Niki
- Owner: (1974–1983): Lion Ferry AB; (1983–1999): Tourship S.A.; (1999–2011): Medinvest SpA; (2011–2016): Almada Shipping Ltd; (2016–present): Moby S.P.A.
- Operator: (1974–1983): Lion Ferry; (1983–2011): Corsica Ferries / Sardinia Ferries; (2011–2016): European Ferries; (2016–present): Moby Lines
- Port of registry: (1974–1983): Varberg, Sweden; (1983–1999): Panama, Panama; (1999–2011): Genoa, Italy; (2011–2014): Panama, Panama; (2014–2016): Limassol, Cyprus; (2016–present): Napoli, Italy
- Route: Piombino – Portoferraio (Elba); Former: Livorno – Bastia; Former: Brindisi – Vlorë / Corfu
- Ordered: 1972
- Builder: Werft Nobiskrug; Rendsburg, Germany
- Yard number: 683
- Laid down: 1973
- Launched: 1974
- Completed: December 1974
- Acquired: 1974 (delivery) October 2016 (by Moby S.P.A.)
- Maiden voyage: 1974
- In service: 1974
- Identification: IMO number: 7350090; Call sign: IBPK; MMSI number: 247373600
- Status: In service

General characteristics
- Class & type: Custom Ro-Pax Ferry
- Tonnage: 9,182 GT; 1,198 DWT
- Length: 118.66 m (389 ft 4 in)
- Beam: 20.72 m (68 ft 0 in)
- Draught: 4.90 m (16 ft 1 in)
- Depth: 6.90 m (22 ft 8 in)
- Decks: 7
- Ramps: Bow and stern loading ramps
- Installed power: 4 × Atlas MaK 9M453AK diesel engines
- Propulsion: 2 × controllable pitch propellers
- Speed: 18.0 knots (33.3 km/h; 20.7 mph) (service) / 20.0 knots (37.0 km/h; 23.0 mph) (max)
- Capacity: 1,440 passengers; 373 cars
- Crew: 35–45

Moby Niki is a ferry operated by the Italian company Moby Lines. Built from 1973 to 1974 by the West German shipyard Werft Nobiskrug for the Swedish company Lion Ferry, it was originally named Europafärjan III. It entered service between Sweden and Denmark in September 1974. Originally operated by Lion Ferry and later Stena Line, it was sold to the Corsica Ferries group in 1983. Operating on routes between Italy and Corsica under the name Corsica Serena II, and then Corsica Serena Seconda from 1999, it was subsequently sold in 2011 to an Italian-Albanian company which sailed it in the Adriatic Sea under the name European Voyager. It was finally acquired in 2016 by Moby Lines, which primarily uses it on routes to the island of Elba.

== History ==
=== Origins and construction ===
The Europafärjan III was ordered in the early 1970s by Lion Ferry to replace the Europafärjan II on the Varberg - Grenå route. The latter, although recently acquired by the Swedish company, quickly proved unsuitable for the route. Its replacement was therefore designed to carry a larger number of vehicles on three car decks at a higher speed. The design of its facilities, however, was geared more towards daytime operation with a limited number of berths.

The keel-laying took place at the Werft Nobiskrug shipyard in Rendsburg, West Germany, on October 24, 1973, then the ship was launched on May 25, 1974. The Europafärjan III was delivered to its owner on September 6, following, shortly after its sea trials.

=== Service ===
==== Lion Ferry/Stena Line (1974-1983) ====
The Europafärjan III begins service between Varberg and Grenå on September 8, 1974. On September 19, 1978, the ship was stranded for twelve hours off the coast of Varberg due to strong gusts of wind and a bow thruster malfunction, making any docking maneuver impossible under those conditions. The car ferry was eventually diverted to Gothenburg and docked at the Stena Line terminal, where passengers were taken to a bus to continue on to Varberg. The ship's bow thruster was subsequently repaired.

On December 10, it ran aground near the island of Kalkgrundet not far from Grenå and remained stuck there for several days before finally being freed.

In August 1982, the Europafärjan III is sold to the company Varberg - Grenå Linjen, a subsidiary of Stena Line, while retaining its usual purpose.

In March 1983, it was then sold to the Luxembourg company Tourship SA, the holding company of the Bastia-based Corsica Ferries group. The car ferry made its last crossing for Stena Line on March 23, then was disarmed in Gothenburg. He then left Sweden on April 24 to reach Italy.

==== Corsica Ferries (1983-2011) ====
Taken over by the Corsica Ferries group, the ship was renamed Corsica Serena II. After some conversion work, including painting it in its new owner's colors, characterized by a yellow hull, the car ferry entered service in May 1983, between Livorno and Bastia.

The arrival of this new vessel allows Corsica Ferries to increase the number of crossings and available berths, particularly in the car deck, at a time when Italian tourism in Corsica is booming. But above all, the commissioning of the Corsica Serena II allows the company to compete with its new Italian rival, Nav. Ar. Ma. Lines, which has also taken advantage of this surge in Italian tourists to establish a route between Livorno and Bastia. The Corsica Ferries fleet also includes the former Europafärjan II, which joined the Bastia-based company in 1976 under the name Corsica Nova.

From the 1997 season, the Corsica Serena II inaugurated the fast “Corsica Shuttle” service between Livorno and Bastia in tandem with the Corsica Marina II.

In 1999, the Corsica Ferries and Sardinia Ferries trademarks were merged and now appear jointly on the sides of the ship, which was renamed Corsica Serena Seconda and registered in the Italian international register.

In 2001, the car ferry had two lateral sponsons added to its sides in order to increase its stability. From the 2006 season, the ship mainly serves Corsica from Nice and Savona.

By the early 2010s, the car ferry no longer met customer expectations. Its design resulted in rather uncomfortable facilities, even for short journeys. Furthermore, the aging vessel no longer complied with the new regulations of the Stockholm Convention. On September 12, 2010, it was disarmed at Savona and put up for sale.

==== Albania Ferries (2011-2016) ====
On May 24, 2011, the Corsica Serena Seconda was acquired by the Portuguese company Almada Shipping, a subsidiary of the Italian-Albanian group Albania Ferries. Renamed European Voyager, it sailed to Brindisi, in eastern Italy, on June 18.

The ship began its new service between Italy and Albania on July 6, on behalf of European Ferries. Due to a lack of investment, the European Voyager retains the yellow livery of Corsica Ferries as well as the interior fittings. Only the logos on the hull and funnel are being removed. No other modifications will be made to the ship, with the exception of the outdoor bar, which was removed in 2012 and replaced with crew accommodations.

In 2014, it was chartered by the company Siremar to provide service between the islands of Linosa and Lampedusa. In October 2016, after spending much of the year laid up in Brindisi, the European Voyager was sold to the Italian company Moby Lines.

==== Moby Lines (since 2016) ====
Renamed Moby Niki, the car ferry underwent extensive transformation in Messina. Its hull was decorated with the image of the Batman character, as were the interior fittings which featured numerous references to the DC Comics hero. Once the modifications were completed, the Moby Niki entered service in May 2017, between Piombino and the island of Elba. On September 19, the ship makes its first stop in Bastia under the Moby Lines banner, marking its first visit to Corsica since 2010.

In December, it struck a shoal while sailing between the island of Elba and the mainland but escaped with little damage. On May 26, 2018, while off the coast of Piombino, the Moby Niki suffered an electrical accident, injuring the chief engineer and an electrician, who were then airlifted to the nearest hospital. The ship returned to Piombino less than an hour after its departure, and the 300 passengers were transferred to other vessels in the Onorato group.

From March to June 2019, due to the seizure of the Moby Kiss, it operated on the connections between Livorno and Bastia together with the Moby Vincent, also continuing to operate occasionally on the Piombino - Portoferraio line. Subsequently, it returned to being used only on the connections between Piombino and Portoferraio.

From 5 to 16 June 2025 it underwent routine maintenance work in dry dock in Livorno. The following day it then returned to regular service on the connections from Piombino to Portoferraio and Bastia. From 3 to 4 September 2025 it exceptionally operated on the Livorno - Bastia route replacing the Moby Zazà.

From 6 January to 24 February 2025, it underwent routine maintenance in the Messina dry dock. It subsequently returned to Piombino, where it was laid up pending the summer season. From 17 April, it finally returned to regular service on the Piombino - Portoferraio routes, paired with the Moby Kiss.

== Facilities ==
The Moby Niki has 9 decks. Passenger facilities are located on decks 6, 7, and 8. Crew quarters occupy most of deck 7 and the lower decks. Decks 3, 4, and 5 are entirely dedicated to the car decks.

=== Common areas ===
The facilities for passengers occupy the entirety of deck 6 and part of decks 7 and 8. The Corsica Serena Seconda was at the time equipped with a bar, a snack bar, a self-service restaurant, and an outdoor bar which was however removed in 2012 by European Ferries.

Following the acquisition of the ship by Moby Lines, numerous transformations took place in terms of the facilities, the decoration was modified and incorporated various references to the Batman universe, and a lounge area with armchairs was installed at the rear on deck 8.

=== Cabins ===
Originally, the ship had 32 cabins. Nine of them, located on deck 7, had full bathrooms while the others, on deck 2 below the garages, only had a washbasin. Since the ship was bought by Moby Lines, no more cabins are being sold for the crossings.

== Features ==
The Moby Niki is 118.70 meters long and 18.54 meters wide, with a tonnage of 9,279 GT since 2012. The ship has a passenger capacity of 1,400 and a garage with space for 400 vehicles spread across three decks. The garage is accessible via two ramp doors, one at the bow and one at the stern. Propulsion is provided by four Atlas MaK 9M453AK diesel engines, developing a capacity of 9,415 kW, giving the ship a speed of 21.5 knots. The ship carries two medium-sized open lifeboats and two smaller ones.

== Routes served ==
For Lion Ferry and then for Stena Line, from 1974 to 1983, the Europafärjan III was assigned between Sweden and Denmark on the Varberg - Grenå route.

From 1983, the ship served Corsica Ferries lines between Italy and Corsica. It thus sails between Livorno and Bastia initially then on La Spezia - Bastia which will however be closed shortly after. In 1997, the Corsica Serena II was placed in tandem with the Corsica Marina II between Livorno and Bastia. In 2006, it was redeployed on the lines between Nice and Corsica and mainly serves L'Île-Rousse and Calvi until September 2010.

Sold in 2011, it was assigned to European Ferries routes between Italy and Albania, mainly from Brindisi to Vlorë and occasionally Durrës. In 2014, it exceptionally operated between Linosa and Lampedusa under a charter agreement with the Siremar company.

In 2017, it joined the Moby Lines fleet, which operated it between the mainland and the island of Elba on the Piombino - Portoferraio route. It was sometimes deployed to Corsica on the Livorno - Bastia, Genoa - Bastia routes and, until 2019, the Nice - Bastia route, replacing other ships usually assigned to these routes.
