= Cavo, Rio =

Cavo
- Frazione
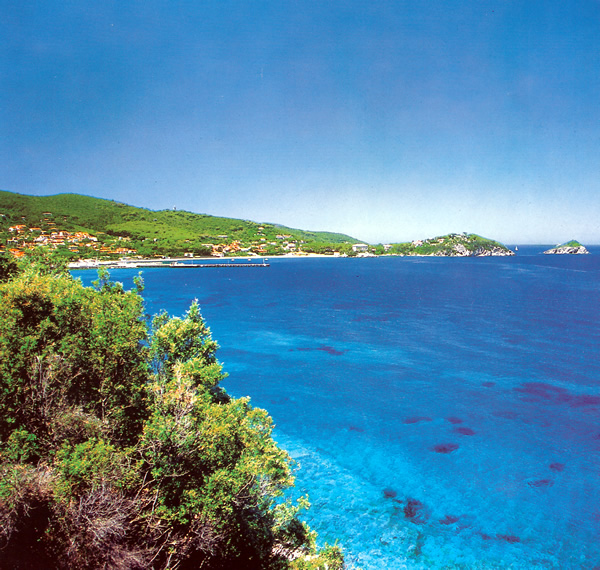

- Location of Cavo in Italy
- Coordinates: 42°51′33″N 10°25′16″E
- Country: Italy
- Region: Tuscany
- Province: Livorno (LI)
- Comune: Rio
- Elevation: 51 m (167 ft)

Population (2011)
  - Total: 620
- Time zone: UTC+1 (CET)
  - Summer (DST): UTC+2 (CEST)
- Postal code: 57038
- Dialing code: (+39) 0565

Cavo is a village in Tuscany, central Italy, administratively a frazione of the comune of Rio, province of Livorno. At the time of the 2011 census its population was 620.

Cavo is located on the Elba Island and it is about 7 km from Rio Marina. The surroundings of Cavo are among the most attractive touristic destinations in the archipelago. The bay Cala del Telegrafo, also known as Fornacelle, is about 1 km from Cavo and is known among the locals as "the beach that sparkles", due to the iron in the fine sand.

== Bibliography ==
- Zecchini, Michelangelo (2001). Isola d'Elba. Le origini. Lucca.
