= Walter Francini =

Brazilian journalist and Esperantist

Walter Augusto Francini (3 June 1926 – 3 May 1996) was a Brazilian journalist and Esperantist. He wrote original books, translated a lot of books to Esperanto and informed and propagandized about the international language. He was active in the "Goodwill" organization.

Francini was born in São Paulo. Until the age of 33, he rejected Esperanto, because of advice from a teacher. However, in 1959, he learned Esperanto with Erlind Salzan in Portoferraio, where Francini was working as a gymnastics teacher. Later he lived and propagandized Esperanto in São Paulo, where he died aged 69.

== Works ==
- Doctor Esperanto (1973)
- Esperanto without Prejudice (1978)
- Speeches to My Children
- Speaking Course
- Brazil: Is It The Paradise of Esperanto?
- Soldier of Christ
