= Nisporto =

- Frazione
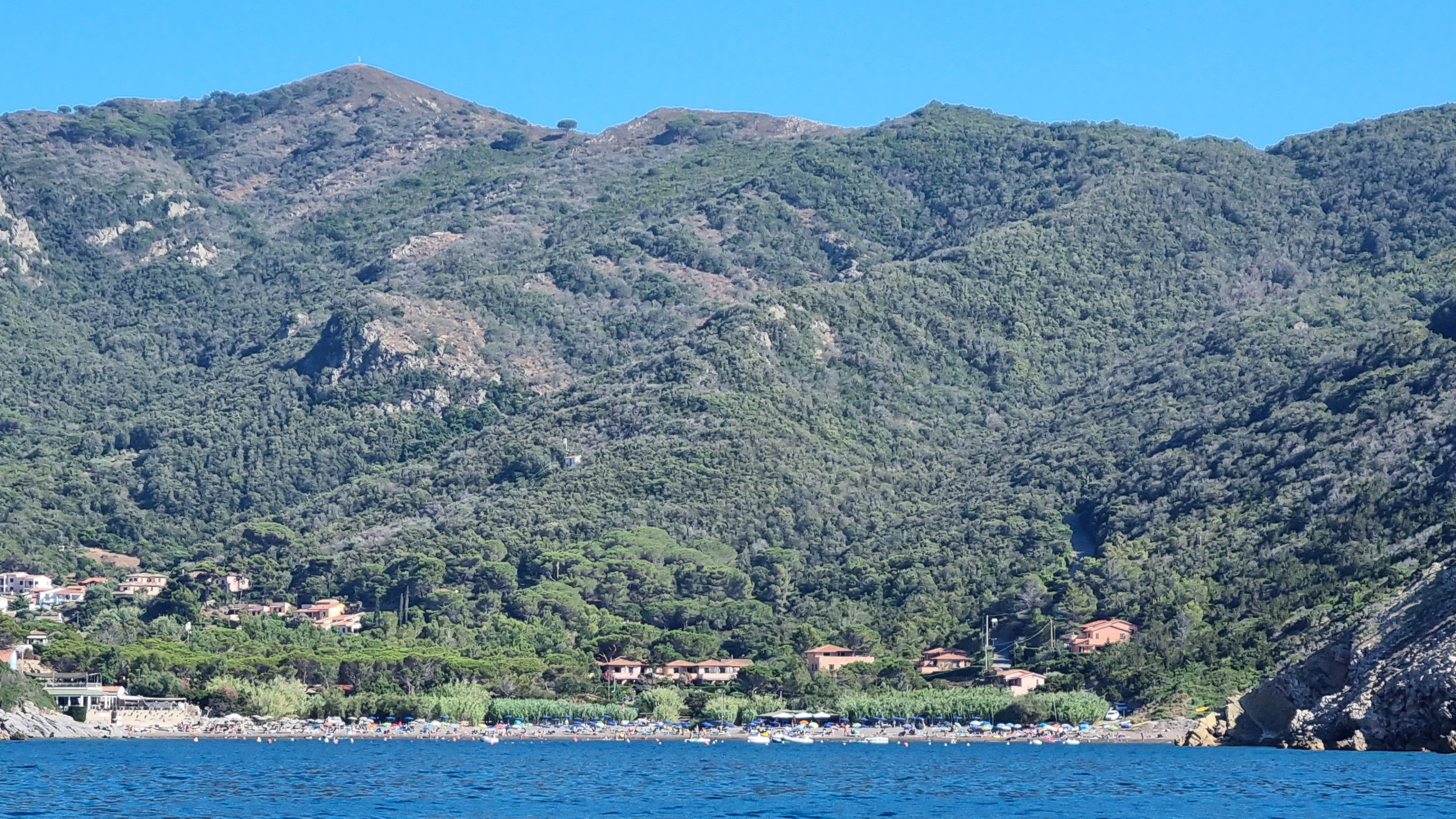

- Location of Nisporto in Italy
- Coordinates: 42°49′25″N 10°22′57″E
- Country: Italy
- Region: Tuscany
- Province: Livorno (LI)
- Comune: Rio
- Elevation: 50 m (160 ft)

Population (2001)
  - Total: 21
- Time zone: UTC+1 (CET)
  - Summer (DST): UTC+2 (CEST)
- Postal code: 57039
- Dialing code: (+39) 0565

Nisporto is a village in Tuscany, central Italy, administratively a frazione of the comune of Rio, province of Livorno. At the time of the 2001 census its population was 21.

Nisporto is located on the Elba Island and it is about 8 km from Rio Marina.
