= Nisportino =

- Frazione
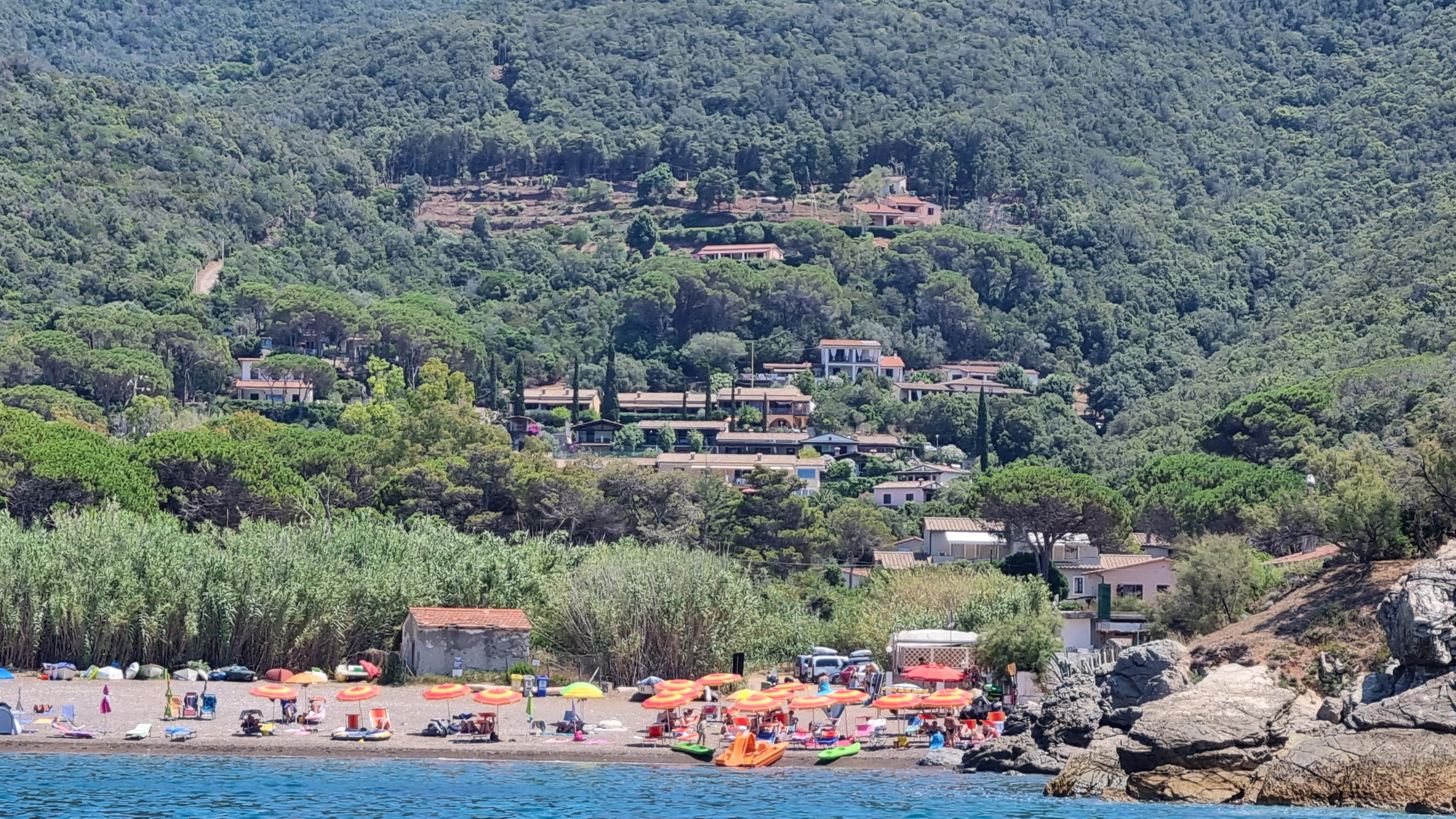

- Location of Nisportino in Italy
- Coordinates: 42°49′54″N 10°23′24″E
- Country: Italy
- Region: Tuscany
- Province: Livorno (LI)
- Comune: Rio
- Elevation: 85 m (279 ft)

Population (2011)
  - Total: 2
- Time zone: UTC+1 (CET)
  - Summer (DST): UTC+2 (CEST)
- Postal code: 57039
- Dialing code: (+39) 0565

Nisportino is a village in Tuscany, central Italy, administratively a frazione of the comune of Rio, province of Livorno. At the time of the 2011 census, its population was 2.

Nisportino is located on the Elba Island and is about 7 kilometres (4.3 mi) from Rio Marina.
