= HSC Express (1996) =

High-speed monohull ferry

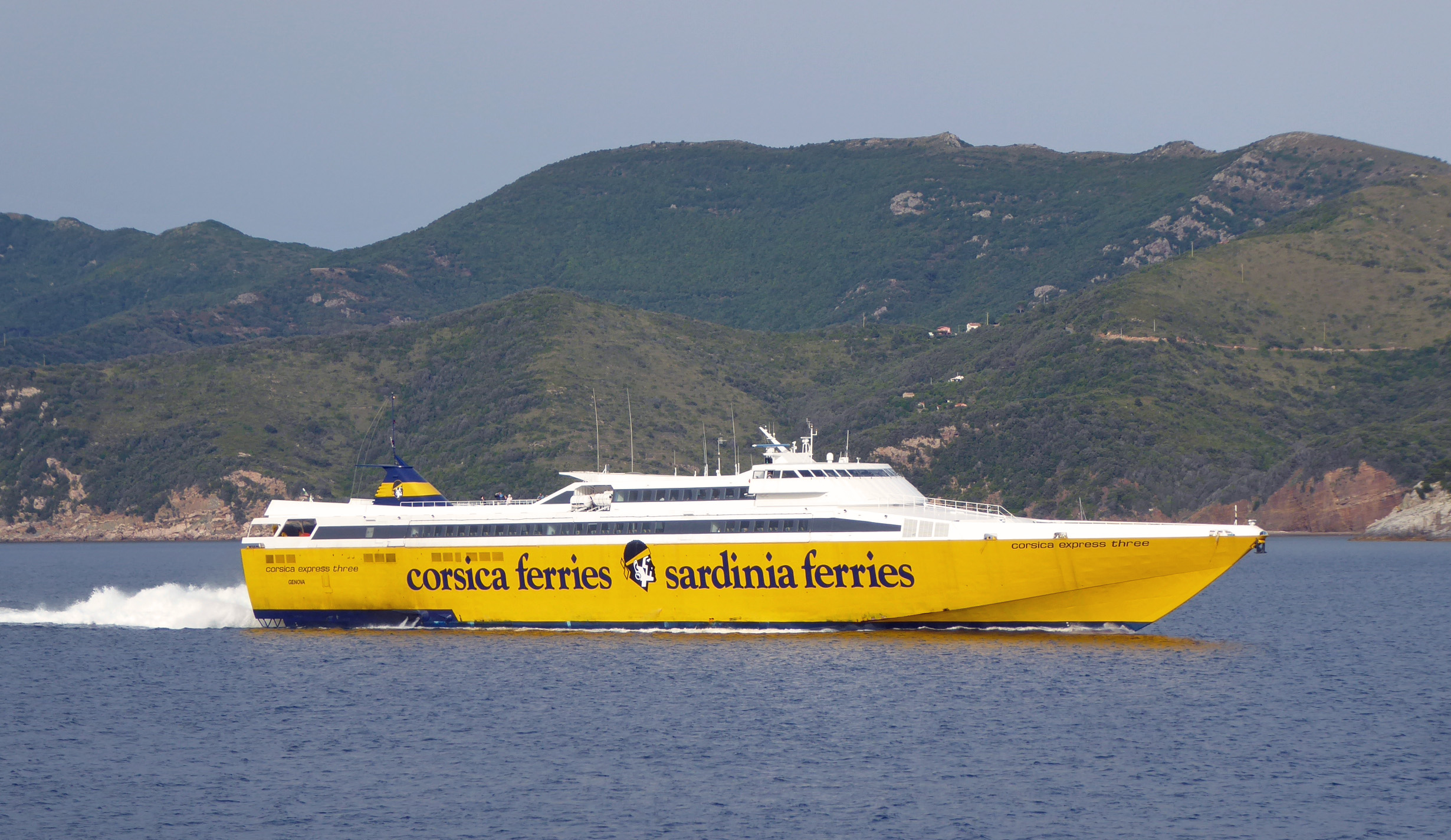
- Express as Corsica Express Three in Portoferraio

History
- Name: (1996–2002): Corsica Express III; (2002–2025): Corsica Express Three; (2025–present): Express
- Owner: (1996–2025): Corsica Ferries - Sardinia Ferries (Tourship / Forship); (2025): Blu Navy; (2025–present): Pikessea Shipping Ltd
- Operator: (1996–2007): Corsica Ferries - Sardinia Ferries; (2007–2009): Kallisti Ferries; (2009–2025): Corsica Ferries - Sardinia Ferries / Elba Ferries; (2025): Blu Navy; (2025-present): Seajets
- Port of registry: (1996–2025): Genoa, Italy; (2025–present): Limassol, Cyprus
- Route: Former: Piombino – Portoferraio; Former: Piombino – Bastia; Former: Piraeus – Naxos – Ikaria – Samos
- Ordered: 1994
- Builder: Industri Navali Meccaniche Affini (INMA); La Spezia, Italy
- Yard number: 4249
- Launched: 1996
- Completed: 1996
- Acquired: 2025
- Maiden voyage: 1996
- In service: 1996
- Identification: IMO number: 9135963; Call sign: IBBV; MMSI number: 247061600
- Status: Laid up

General characteristics
- Class & type: Aquastrada TMV 103 (Monohull)
- Tonnage: 3,530 GT; 280 DWT
- Length: 103.55 m (339 ft 9 in)
- Beam: 14.50 m (47 ft 7 in)
- Draft: 2.00 m (6 ft 7 in)
- Decks: 2
- Ramps: Rear loading ramps
- Installed power: 4 × MTU 20V 1163 TB73L diesel engines (total 24,000 kW)
- Propulsion: 4 × KaMeWa waterjets
- Speed: 37.0 knots (68.5 km/h; 42.6 mph) (service)
- Capacity: 535 passengers; 150 cars

Express is a high-speed ship that belongs to Greek ferry operator Seajets. Built in 1996 by the Industrie Navali Meccaniche Affini (INMA) shipyard in La Spezia, it was originally named Corsica Express III for Corsica/Sardinia ferries. Commissioned in September 1996 on the Nice - Corsica route, it operated crossings to the Isle of Beauty until 2006. Subsequently assigned to the Aegean routes of its subsidiary Kallisti Ferries, it was laid up in 2009 following the closure of the route. Out of service for over five years, it finally returned to service in 2014 to replace the Corsica Express Seconda on the Elba route, sailing every summer season between Piombino and the Tuscan island for Corsica Ferries until 2024. Due to the sale of the company's Elba operations to rival shipowner Blu Navy at the beginning of 2025, the vessel was initially chartered by Blu Navy and then ultimately sold in April. On 7 October 2025, it was announced that the ferry had been sold to the Cypriot company Pikessea Shipping Ltd, which is owned by the Greek company Seajets.

== History ==
=== Origins and construction ===
In the early 1990s, technological advances enabling the construction of high-speed vehicle-carrying ships prompted a growing number of shipowners worldwide to acquire such vessels. The Bastia-based company Corsica Ferries was one of the first operators in the Mediterranean to order a ship of this type. Convinced by the potential of these vessels, management ultimately ordered three identical ships, with entry into service planned for 1995. However, due to changes in safety regulations following the sinking of the Estonia in the Baltic Sea in 1995, the order was delayed. But also because of the financial difficulties encountered by the Rodriguez shipyards, where the order for the three ships was placed, their commissioning was delayed. The first, named Corsica Express, was not inaugurated until the end of 1995, while its sister ship, the Corsica Express II, began its rotations at the start of the 1996 summer season.

Corsica Ferries' strategy dictates that each high-speed ferry (NGV) operate on one of the company's routes. Thus, the first NGV is intended to sail between Italy and Corsica, and the second between the mainland and Sardinia. The third is slated to inaugurate a new service between Nice and Corsica. Due to construction delays, it will ultimately be the second vessel that launches the Nice route, before its sister ship takes over upon entering service.

This one, called Corsica Express III, was laid down at the Industrie Navali Meccaniche Affini shipyard in La Spezia on February 10, 1996 and launched on May 21. After finishing touches, it was delivered in September to the Corsica Ferries group.

=== Service ===
The Corsica Express III entered service on September 16, 1996 on the lines between Nice and Corsica replacing its sister the Corsica Express II which is transferred to the lines between Italy and Corsica. As required by French legislation of that time, the Corsica Express III sailed under the French flag.

In 1999, the Corsica Ferries and Sardinia Ferries brands were merged and now appear together on the ship's sides. Unlike the rest of the fleet, which is registered in the Italian international register, the Corsica Express III symbolically retains the French flag. However, it will be registered under the Italian international flag in 2002 and renamed Corsica Express Three.

During the 2004 season, the ship swapped routes with its sister ship, the Sardinia Express, and sailed between Italy and Sardinia. It returned to the Corsican routes the following season. During the 2000s, rising fuel prices made operating high-speed ferries increasingly expensive. As a result, the company significantly reduced the number of these vessels scheduled each year. At the end of the 2006 season, the Corsica Express Three was decommissioned and its service to Corsica was not renewed for the 2007 season.

However, the Corsica Ferries group will find it another use by transferring it in June to its new subsidiary Kallisti Ferries, which will operate services between mainland Greece and the Cyclades archipelago. The Corsica Express Three begins its sailings from Piraeus on June 29.

On December 18, 2008 the ship was in the port of Samothrace, strong gusts caused its moorings to break and the NGV drifted for about a hundred meters before being driven against small trawlers moored against the quay, causing several damage to the latter.

In July 2009, following a crisis that severely impacted the Aegean ferry market, Kallisti Ferries' services were suspended. The Corsica Express Three then returned to Savona where it was laid up.

From the 2014 season, after about five years without assignment, the ship finally resumed service on the Corsica Ferries route between Piombino, ElbaI sland and Corsica, replacing the Corsica Express Seconda.

On August 20, 2024, as the Corsica Express Three departed Piombino at 3:15 p.m. for another sailing to Elba, a fire broke out in the engine room shortly after departure. The crew was then forced to return to the port of Piombino, where the 274 passengers were evacuated using the emergency slides, as the opening mechanisms of the rear access ramp had been damaged by the fire. Apart from a few minor incidents, all those on board the ship were safe and sound.

On 8 January 2025, the sale of the Elba Ferries company (a branch of Corsica Ferries) to the Elban company BluNavy was announced. As a result, the ship was also chartered to BluNavy for the 2025 summer season on the connections between Piombino and Portoferraio. On 17 April 2025 it was transferred from Genoa to Piombino and disarmed again. On 29 April 2025, its definitive sale to BluNavy was announced. On 30 July 2025, given the unit's lack of use, it was transferred to Augusta, where it was again decommissioned.

On 7 October 2025, it was announced that the ferry had been sold to the Cypriot company Pikessea Shipping Ltd, which is owned by the Greek company Seajets, from which the name was truncated to Express. Following this, on the morning of 25 October it sailed under tow by the tug Iraklis Z for Astakos, where it arrived two days later.

== Facilities ==
The Corsica Express Three has 6 decks. Passenger facilities are located on decks 4 and 5, while the car decks occupy decks 1, 2 and 3.

Passengers are seated in a spacious lounge area occupying the entirety of deck 4. A snack bar is also located on deck 5.

== Features ==
The Corsica Express Three is 103 meters long and 14.50 meters wide, with a tonnage of 3,530 GT. The ship has a passenger capacity of 580 and features a garage with space for 150 vehicles spread across three decks, accessible via a stern ramp. Propulsion is provided by four MTU 20V1163TB73L engines, each producing 24,000 kW and powering two steerable waterjets, giving the ship a speed of 37 knots. The vessel is equipped with inflatable life rafts accessible via slides.

== Routes served ==
Upon its entry into service, the Corsica Express III was positioned on the Corsican routes departing from Nice towards Bastia and Calvi. During the summer of 2004, it was exceptionally deployed between Italy and Sardinia on the Civitavecchia - Golfo Aranci route.

In June 2007 it was transferred to the Greek subsidiary Kallisti Ferries and served the islands of Naxos, Ikaria, Fourni and Samos from Piraeus until July 2009.

From the 2014 season onwards, the Corsica Express Three is used every summer between Piombino and Portoferraio on the island of Elba and also serves Bastia.

== Sister ships ==
- Bellone
- Paros Jet
