= List of ship decommissionings in 1982 =

The list of ship decommissionings in 1982 includes a chronological list of ships decommissioned in 1982. In cases where no official decommissioning ceremony was held, the date of withdrawal from service may be used instead.

Date	Operator	Ship	Class and type	Fate and other notes
March 1	Royal Danish Navy	Aarøsund	Adjutant-class minesweeper	
April 8	(Sweden) Stena Line	Stena Baltica	Ferry	Sold to D.A.N.E. as Ialyssos
June 18	Royal New Zealand Navy	Taranaki	Rothesay-class frigate	Sold and broken up
June 26	(Sweden) Stena Sessan Line	Prinsessan Desirée	Ferry	Actual date unknown (no later than 26 June), laid up until chartered to Sally Line UK on 26 June
June 30	Royal Australian Navy	Melbourne	Majestic-class aircraft carrier	Sold for scrap
August 31	(Finland) Vaasanlaivat-Vasabåtarna	Wasa Star	Cruiseferry	Laid up until sub-chartered to Karageorgis Line in 1983
September 5	(United Kingdom) Sally Line UK	Prinsessan Desirée	Ferry	Returned to Stena Sessan Line and laid up until transferred to Varberg-Grenå Linjen in 1983 and renamed Europafärjan
October 25	(Denmark) DFDS Seaways	Tor Scandinavia	Cruiseferry	Chartered to a Dutch company and renamed World Wide Expo
November 1	Svea Line (Finland)	Fennia	Ferry	Laid up until chartered to B&I Line in 1983
December 17	German Navy	Köln		Decommissioned until used as a hulk at Neustadt
Unknown date	Royal Navy	Bacchante	Leander-class frigate	Sold to New Zealand and renamed HMNZS Wellington
Unknown date	Republic of China Navy	Minquan	Gunboat	Retired as museum ship and subsequently scrapped
