= Portoferraio Lighthouse =

Forte Stella
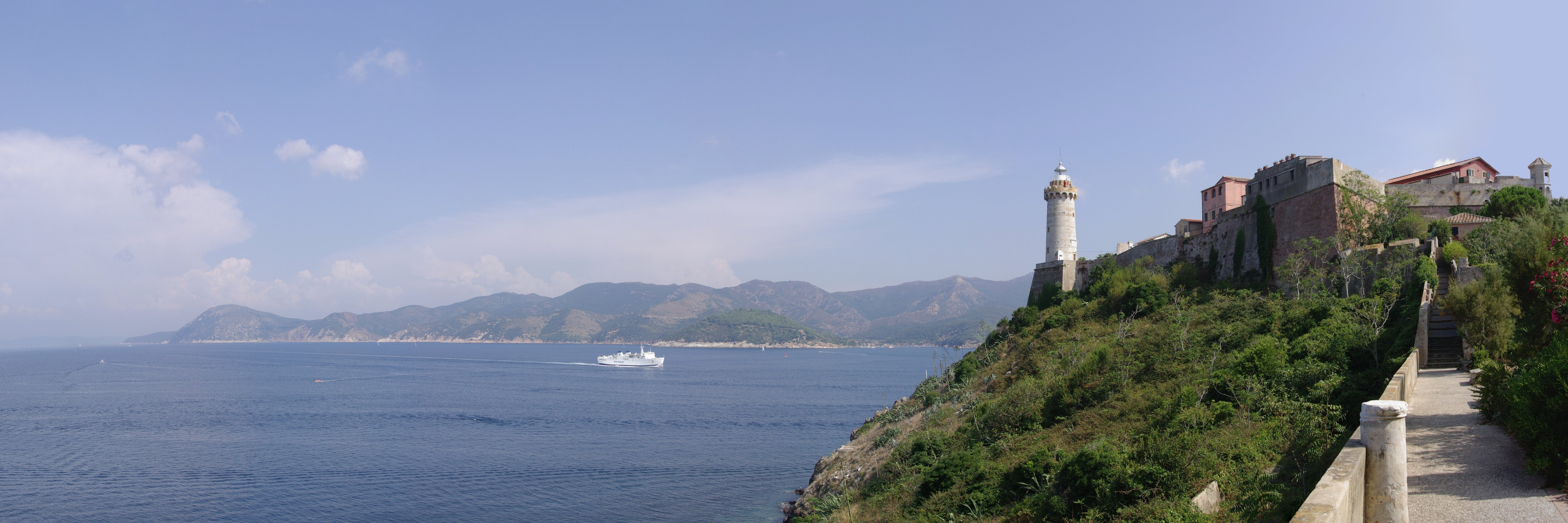
- Portoferraio Lighthouse with the eastern Elba in background
- Location: Portoferraio; Elba; Tuscany; Italy
- Coordinates: 42°48′59″N 10°20′03″E

Tower
- Constructed: 1788; 1915 (restored)
- Construction: light stone tower
- Height: 25 metres (82 ft)
- Shape: cylindrical tower with double balcony and lantern
- Markings: unpainted light stone tower, grey lantern
- Power source: mains electricity
- Operator: Marina Militare

Light
- First lit: 1788
- Focal height: 63 metres (207 ft)
- Lens: Type OF 500; Focal length: 250 mm
- Intensity: main: AL 1000 W reserve: LABI 100 W
- Range: main: 16 nautical miles (30 km; 18 mi) reserve: 11 nautical miles (20 km; 13 mi)
- Characteristic: Fl (3) W 14s. (2072 E.F.); F R (2072.2 E.F.)
- Italy no.: 2072 E.F. and 2072.2 E.F.

Portoferraio lighthouse (Italian: Faro di Portoferraio), called Faro del Forte Stella Lighthouse since is placed on the northern rampart of Forte Stella built in 1548 by Cosimo I de' Medici in Portoferraio, Elba.

== Description ==
The lighthouse was built by Leopod II Grand Duke of Tuscany in 1788; the light stone tower is 25 metres high and has a double balcony and lantern and was restored in 1915. The lighthouse is fully automated, operated by Marina Militare and identified by the code number 2072 E.F.; the lantern is at 63 metres (207 ft) above sea level and emits a group of three white lightning flashes in a 14 seconds period visible up to 16 nautical miles. On the same tower is an additional light identified by the number 2072.2 E.F. that emits a red fixed light at 60 metres above sea level to warn the ships about the Capo Bianco shoal.

== See also ==
- List of lighthouses in Italy
