= HSC Bellone =

Monohull fast ferry

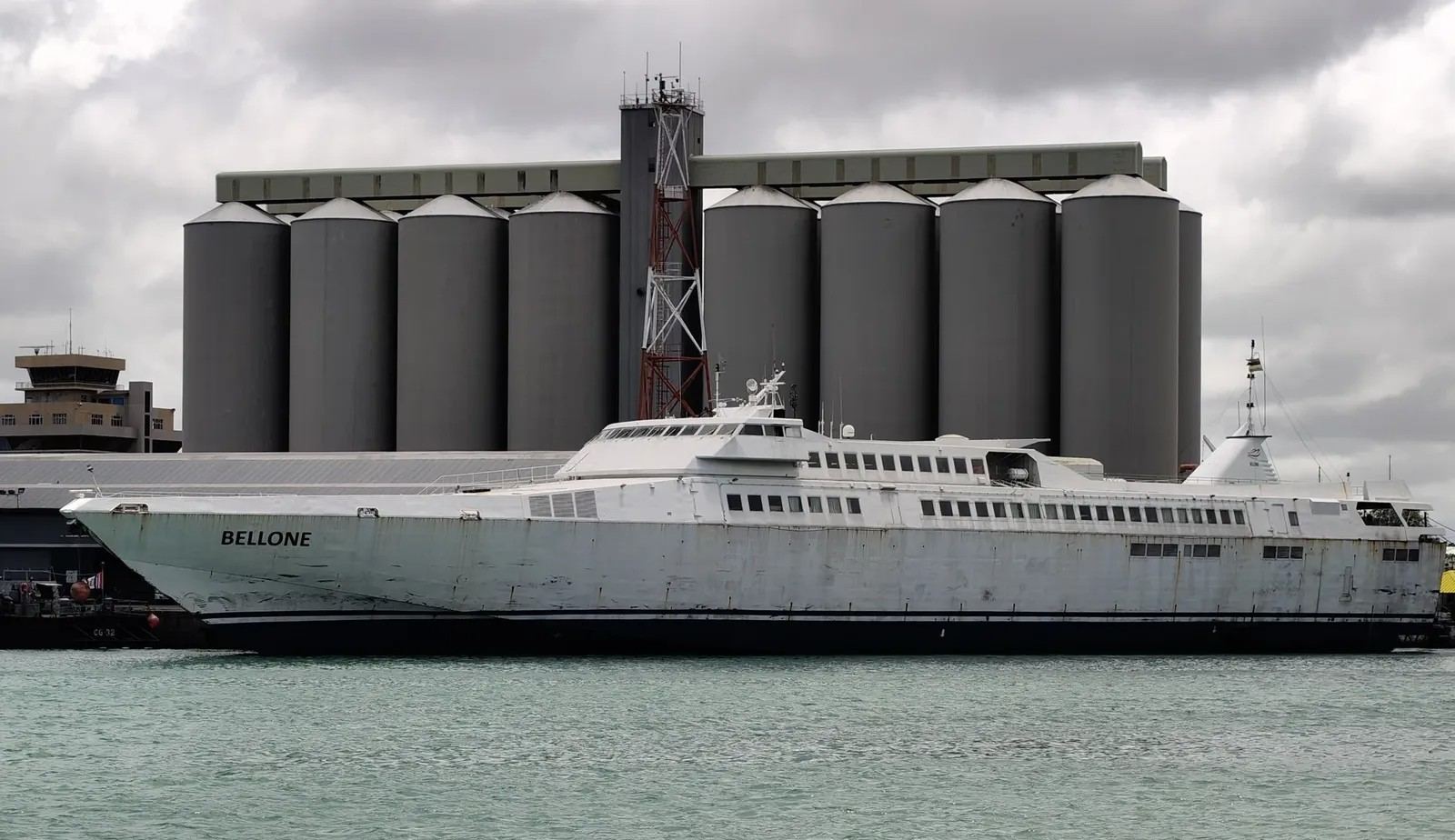
- Bellone laid up in Port Louis

History
- Name: (1995–1997): Corsica Express; (1997–2012): Sardinia Express; (2012–2013): Tamnara; (2013–2017): Araqueens; (2017–2021): Blue Tsushima; (2021–2024): New Mikasa; (2024–present): Bellone
- Owner: (1995–2012): Corsica Ferries / Sardinia Ferries (Tourship / Forship); (2012–2013): Medinvest SpA; (2013–2017): Hyangil Shipping Co. Ltd.; (2017–2021): Tsushima High Speed Ferry; (2021–2024): Iki Kaihatsu KK; (2024–present): Sinatambou VR
- Operator: (1995–2012): Corsica Ferries / Sardinia Ferries; (2013–2017): Hyangil Shipping; (2017–2021): Tsushima High Speed Ferry; (2021–2024): Iki Kaihatsu KK
- Port of registry: (1995–2012): Olbia / Cagliari, Italy; (2012–2017): Pohang, South Korea; (2017–2021): Panama; (2021–2024): Ulaanbaatar, Mongolia; (2024): Bissau, Guinea-Bissau; (2024–present): Willemstad, Curaçao
- Route: Former: Piombino – Bastia / Golfo Aranci; Former: Pohang – Ullungdo; Former: Busan – Tsushima
- Ordered: 1994
- Builder: Rodriquez Cantieri Navali; Pietra Ligure, Italy
- Yard number: 257
- Laid down: 17 December 1993
- Launched: 1995
- Completed: 1995
- Acquired: 2024
- Maiden voyage: 1995
- In service: 1995
- Identification: IMO number: 9108245; Call sign: J5AR5 / PJP13; MMSI number: 630001151 / MMSI number: 306102000
- Status: Sunk in 2026

General characteristics
- Class & type: Aquastrada TMV 103 (Monohull)
- Tonnage: 3,560 GT; 355 DWT
- Length: 103.00 m (337 ft 11 in)
- Beam: 14.50 m (47 ft 7 in)
- Draft: 2.20 m (7 ft 3 in)
- Decks: 2
- Ramps: Rear loading ramps
- Installed power: 4 × MTU 20V 1163 TB73L diesel engines (total 24,000 kW)
- Propulsion: 3 waterjets
- Speed: 37.0 knots (68.5 km/h; 42.6 mph) (service)
- Capacity: 535 passengers; 150 cars
- Crew: 12 (reported in 2008)
- Notes: Constructed with a high-tensile steel hull and aluminum superstructure.

Bellone was a 103-metre high-speed monohull passenger and vehicle ferry built by Rodriquez Cantieri Navali in 1995 as part of the Aquastrada TMV 103 series. Originally entering service for Corsica Ferries / Sardinia Ferries as Corsica Express, she operated fast Tyrrhenian crossings primarily as Sardinia Express (1997–2012). Following her Mediterranean career, the vessel served various Asian routes under the names Tamnara, Araqueens, Blue Tsushima, and New Mikasa before being renamed Bellone in 2024.

== Service ==
Bellone's keel was laid on 17 December 1993 at the Rodriquez shipyard in Pietra Ligure, Italy. It was the only vessel of the Aquastrada TMV 103 class built at that shipyard, while its sister ships were constructed at the INMA shipyard in La Spezia under licence from Rodriquez.

Launched on 28 September 1995 at the Rodriquez shipyards in Pietra Ligure with the name of Corsica Express in the presence of Pascal Lota and delivered the following November to Corsica Ferries, it entered service on 12 November on the connections between Genoa, Livorno, Calvi and L'Île Rousse.

In 1996, with the entry into service of its twin vessel Corsica Express II, it was chartered to the Venezuelan Conferrys and used for about a year on the connections between Puerto La Cruz and Punta de Piedras. Once the charter ended, in June 1997 it was transferred to Sardinia Ferries and, renamed Sardinia Express, entered service on the connections between Civitavecchia, Golfo Aranci and Livorno. Over the years, it was also used occasionally on the connections between Piombino and the Sardinian port. In the summer of 2003 it returned to service on the routes between Vado Ligure, Nice and Bastia. In 2004 it was transferred again to the routes to Golfo Aranci.

On the evening of 31 July 2007, one of its four engines failed, forcing the company to cancel the following morning's departure from Livorno to Golfo Aranci, causing inconvenience to around 500 passengers. However, at 6pm the fault was resolved and the ferry set sail for Sardinia.

At around 2.30 am on 8 August 2007, while sailing from Golfo Aranci to Piombino, 8 miles from the Corsican coast with 209 passengers and 20 crew members on board, one of the ferry's engines caught fire. However, the crew activated the carbon dioxide system to smother the flames and sealed the engine room with fire doors, limiting the spread of the fire. At six in the morning it was reached by the Mega Express Three, sailing from Livorno to Golfo Aranci at the time of the accident, and, hooked up by the latter with considerable difficulty due to the strong wind, it was towed towards Bastia until the arrival of the Corsican tug Reable, which had arrived on site from Bonifacio, and the ocean-going tug Abeille Flandre, which had also arrived to assist the ferry. Thanks to the rapid intervention of the crew and the rescue services, there were no injuries and the fire was extinguished in the early afternoon. Subsequently, the 209 passengers present on board at the time of the accident were disembarked and transferred to Livorno aboard the Corsica Marina Seconda. Subsequently, it returned to regular service until the end of the season, when it was decommissioned in Vado Ligure and put up for sale.

According to a 2008 maritime industry report, Sardinia Express was withdrawn from service for most of August 2007 to undergo major repairs, causing disruption during the peak passenger season.

In September 2012, after five years of decommissioning, it was sold to the Korean Hyangil Shipping and on 12 September it left Vado Ligure for Yeosu, where it arrived on 24 September. Renamed Tamnara, it entered service in February 2013 on the routes between Goheung and Seogwipo. In March 2013, it was renamed Araqueens and transferred to services between Pohang and Ulleungdo. On 20 July 2013, while sailing to Pohang, a fire broke out in the ferry's engine room, which was promptly evacuated by the crew. However, one firefighter was injured due to the general confusion. Repaired, it returned to regular service in April 2014.

In June 2014, it was seized in Pohang by the Korean authorities due to the owner's failure to pay repair costs, amounting to 1,445,350,000won. On June 6, it was put up for auction by the Korean authorities for 12,618,184,000 won. On June 8, the selling price was lowered to 8,828,319,000 won, equal to 70% of the ferry's estimated value at the time of the auction. In February 2016, it was sold to Golf & Resort and on March 3, it sailed from Pohang to Busan, where, upon arrival, it was renamed Blue Tsushima.

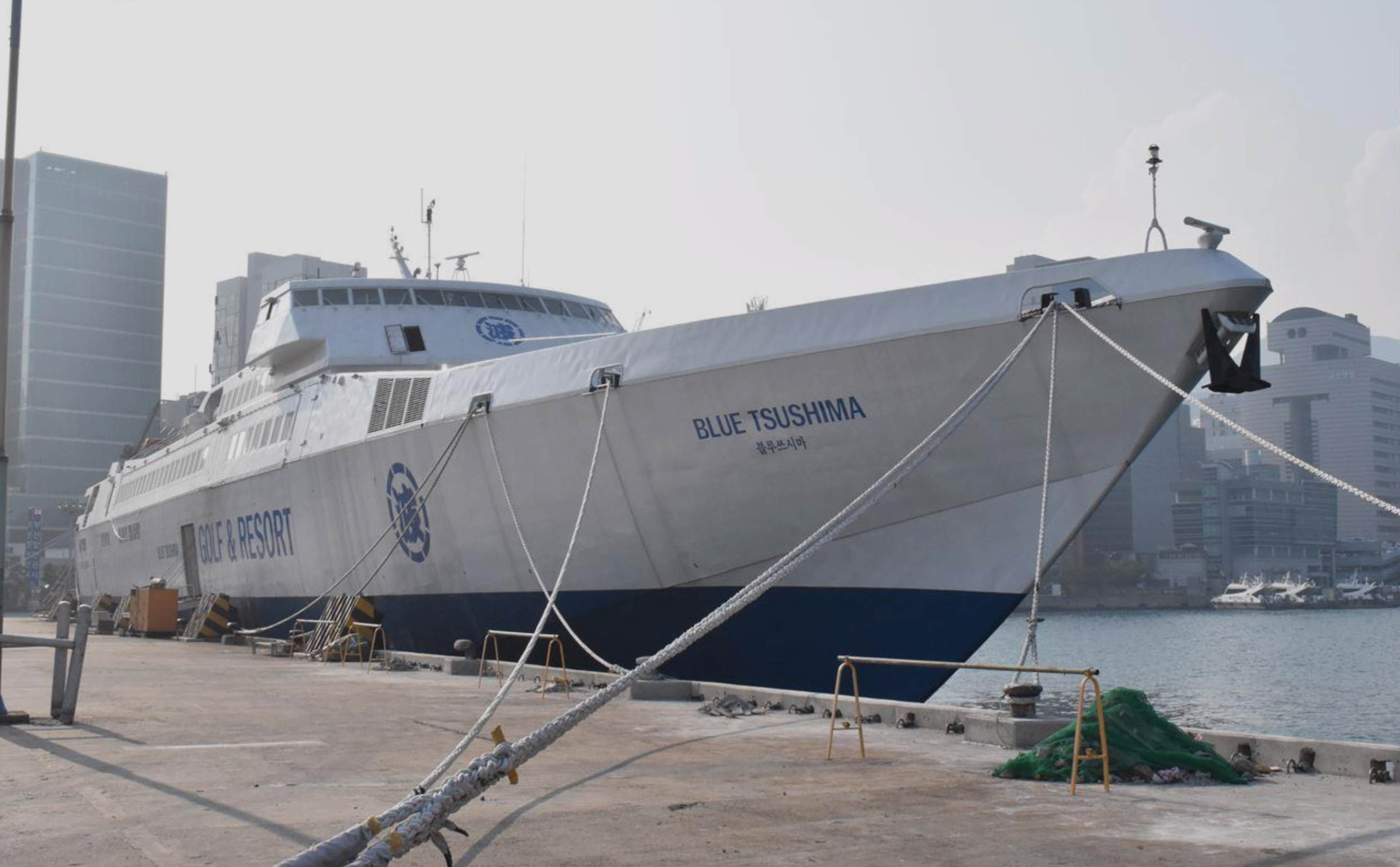
The vessel operating as Blue Tsushima in Busan, South Korea, in May 2019.

In 2017, it began service on the Busan - Tshushima routes under the Tsushima High Speed Ferry banner. In August 2019, following the decline in passenger traffic due to the trade war between Japan and South Korea, it was decommissioned in Busan and put up for sale.

In February 2021, after almost 2 years of decommissioning, it was sold to the Panamanian company S & J Line Sa, by which it was renamed New Mikasa. However, in March it was sold again to the Japanese Iki Kaihatsu KK and entered service in the spring of the same year on the connections between Imari and Iki. In December 2023 it was again disarmed in Busan and put up for sale. In 2024 it was sold to the Papuan Ever Eco Fast Ferries and, renamed Bellone, was transferred to Port Louis, where it was laid up until 2026.

== Final years in Mauritius (2024–2026) ==
Bellone arrived in Port Louis, Mauritius, on 26 February 2024. The vessel was detained by Mauritian authorities on 16 July 2024 following the expiry of its seaworthiness certificates.

The vessel subsequently became the subject of a seafarer abandonment case involving ten Vietnamese crew members and unpaid wages. The remaining crew members were repatriated in January 2025.

In October 2026, Bellone was towed out of Port Louis and deliberately sunk at sea. The operation attracted criticism, with maritime expert Alain Malherbe questioning its cost and suggesting that selling the vessel could have recovered some of its value.

== Sister ships ==
- Paros Jet
- Express
