= Magazzini, Portoferraio =

Magazzini
- Frazione
- Location of Magazzini in Italy
- Coordinates: 42°47′58″N 10°21′28″E
- Country: Italy
- Region: Tuscany
- Province: Livorno (LI)
- Comune: Portoferraio
- Elevation: 1 m (3.3 ft)

Population (2011)
  - Total: 176
- Time zone: UTC+1 (CET)
  - Summer (DST): UTC+2 (CEST)
- Postal code: 57037
- Dialing code: (+39) 0565

Magazzini is a village in Tuscany, central Italy, administratively a frazione of the comune of Portoferraio, province of Livorno. At the time of the 2011 census its population was 176.

Magazzini is located on the Elba Island and it is about 8 km from Portoferraio.

== Bibliography ==
- Guide d'Italia. Toscana. Milan: Touring Club Italiano. 2012. p. 465.
