= Bagnaia, Livorno =

Bagnaia
- Frazione
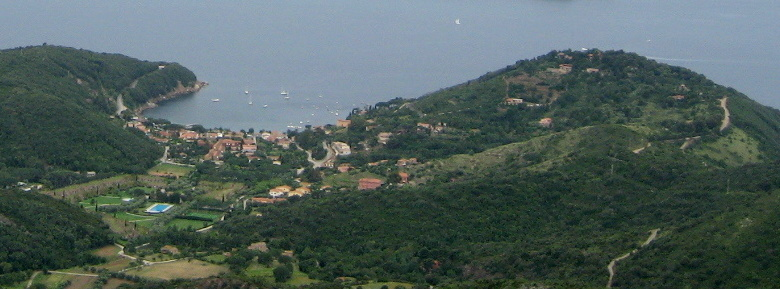

- Location of Bagnaia in Italy
- Coordinates: 42°48′41″N 10°21′49″E
- Country: Italy
- Region: Tuscany
- Province: Livorno (LI)
- Comune: Portoferraio; Rio
- Elevation: 3 m (9.8 ft)

Population (2011)
  - Total: 261
- Time zone: UTC+1 (CET)
  - Summer (DST): UTC+2 (CEST)
- Postal code: 57037; 57039
- Dialing code: (+39) 0565

Bagnaia is a village in Tuscany, central Italy, administratively a frazione of the comuni of Portoferraio and Rio, province of Livorno. At the time of the 2011 census its population was 261.

Bagnaia is located on the Elba Island about 10 km (6.2 mi) east from Portoferraio.
