= Scaglieri =

- Frazione
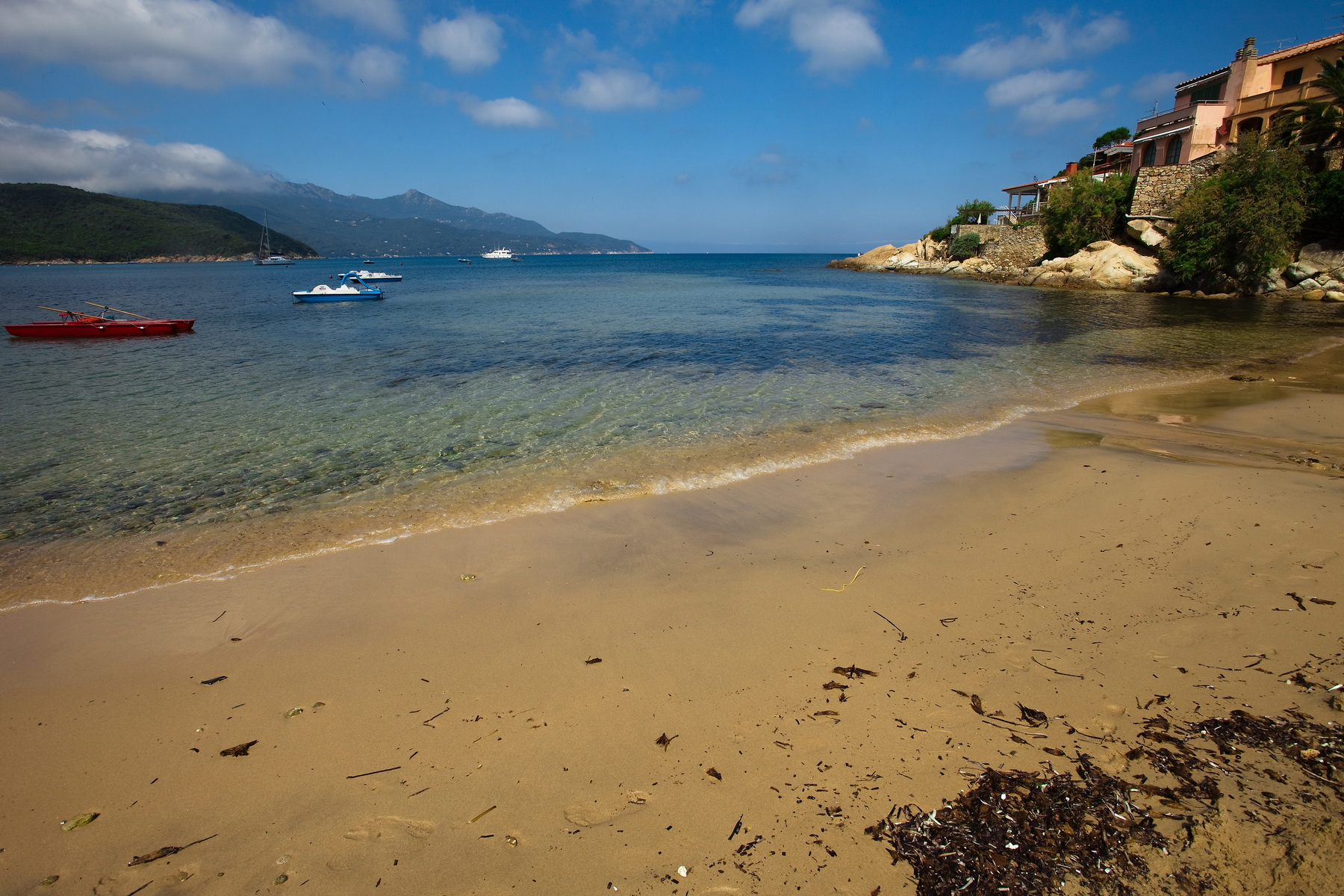

- Location of Scaglieri in Italy
- Coordinates: 42°48′12″N 10°16′7″E
- Country: Italy
- Region: Tuscany
- Province: Livorno (LI)
- Comune: Portoferraio
- Elevation: 10 m (33 ft)

Population (2011)
  - Total: 80
- Time zone: UTC+1 (CET)
  - Summer (DST): UTC+2 (CEST)
- Postal code: 57037
- Dialing code: (+39) 0565

Scaglieri is a village in Tuscany, central Italy, administratively a frazione of the comune of Portoferraio, province of Livorno. At the time of the 2011 census its population was 80.

Scaglieri is located on the Elba Island and 7 km west from Portoferraio. The frazione includes the three hamlets of Scaglieri, Forno and Biodola.

== Bibliography ==
- Guide d'Italia. Toscana. Milan: Touring Club Italiano. 2012. p. 465.
