= Corsica Ferries - Sardinia Ferries =

French-Italian ferry company

Corsica Ferries Sardinia Ferries
- Industry: Shipping, Transport
- Predecessor: Corsica Line
- Founded: 1967
- Headquarters: Corsica, Bastia; Italy, Vado Ligure
- Key people: Andrea Duilio
- Owner: Duilio Corporation
- Parent: Lozali S.A
- Website: www.corsicaferries.co.uk

House flag

Corsica Ferries - Sardinia Ferries (Corsica Ferries France SAS – Forship SpA) is a Franco-Italian ferry company that operates traffic to and from the islands of Corsica, Sardinia and Elba.

The ferry company was founded in 1967 by the Corsican Pascal Lota under the name of Corsica Line with one ferry, the Corsica Express. Since the company's humble beginnings it has continuously grown and is today the market leader to Corsica and Sardinia.

Corsica Sardinia Ferries is the premier ferry operator on the Western Mediterranean Sea transporting more than 2.8 million passengers annually aboard their ferries running to and from France and Italy to Corsica, Sardinia and Elba.

Corsica Sardinia Ferries operate two return routes from Italy to Sardinia and 10 return routes from France and Italy to Corsica, with a total of up to 13 crossings daily.

The fleet currently consists of 14 vessels. Thanks to its no-frills economical model, the company today holds a market share of 68.7% of the maritime traffic to Corsica (2017).

In 2005, Forship Spa, a subsidiary of Corsica Sardinia Ferries, has been condemned to pay 490 000 euros by the Tribunal of Marseille for having "voluntary discharged at sea" offshore of the Cap Corse on May 12, 2004.

== Current fleet ==
| Ship | Built | Entered Service | Gross tonnage | Length | Width | Passengers | Vehicles | Knots | Flag | Image |
|---|---|---|---|---|---|---|---|---|---|---|
| MS Mega Express | 2001 | 2001– | 26,400 GT | 173 m | 24.5 m | 1.756 | 550 | 29 | (Italy) | |
| MS Mega Express Two | 2001 | 2001– | 26,400 GT | 173 m | 24.5 m | 1.756 | 550 | 29 | (Italy) | |
| MS Mega Express Three | 2001 | 2004– | 29,637 GT | 212 m | 25 m | 2.100 | 650 | 30,5 | (Italy) | |
| MS Mega Express Four | 1995 | 2006– | 24,186 GT | 174 m | 24 m | 2.000 | 650 | 27 | (Italy) | |
| MS Mega Smeralda | 1985 | 2008– | 34,694 GT | 171.5 m | 27.6 m | 2.000 | 550 | 22 | (Italy) | |
| MS Mega Andrea | 1986 | 2015– | 34,694 GT | 171.5 m | 27.6 m | 2.000 | 560 | 22 | (Italy) | |
| MS Pascal Lota | 2008 | 2017– | 36,299 GT | 177 m | 27.6 m | 2.080 | 665 | 27 | (Italy) | |
| MS Mega Regina | 1985 | 2021– | 37,860 GT | 175.7 m | 28.4 m | 2.500 | 665 | 22 | (Italy) | |
| MS Mega Victoria | 1988 | 2022– | 34,384 GT | 169.4 m | 27.6 m | 2.420 | 450 | 21,5 | (Italy) | |
| MS Mega Serena | 1987 | 2026– | 39,191 GT | 175.4 m | 30.8 m | 2.400 | 550 | 21,5 | (Italy) | |

== Former fleet ==
| Ship | Built | In service | Current status |
|---|---|---|---|
| Corsica Express | | 1968–1975 | Scrapped in 1986. |
| Corsica Ferry | | 1972–1976 | Scrapped as Azzura II in Aliaga, Turkey in 2011. |
| Corsica Star | | 1973–1980 | Sank as Jassim in Wingate Reef in 2003. |
| Corsica Serena | | 1975–1981 | Scrapped in Gadani Beach, Pakistan in 2003. |
| Corsica Nova | | 1976–1988 | Scrapped in Aliaga, Turkey in 2011. |
| A Regina | | 1979–1985 | Scrapped in 1989. |
| Corsica Marina | | 1977–1990 | Scrapped in Aliaga, Turkey in 2013. |
| Corsica Viva | | 1980–1985 | Scrapped in Aliaga, Turkey in 2004. |
| Sardinia Viva | | 1980–1994 | Scrapped as Derin Deniz in Alang, India in 2004. |
| Elba Nova | | 1992–1998 | Lady Carmela since 2019. |
| Sardinia Nova | 1966 | 1982–2006 | Scrapped as Atlas Han in Iskenderun, Turkey in 2015. |
| Corsica Serena Seconda | 1974 | 1983–2011 | Moby Niki for Moby Lines since 2017. |
| Corsica Express | 1995 | 1995-1997 | Bellone since 2024. |
| Corsica Express Seconda | 1995 | 1996–2015 | Paros Jet for Seajets since 2015. |
| Corsica Express Three | 1996 | 1996-2025 | Express for Seajets since 2025. |
| Sardinia Regina | 1972 | 1985–2021 | Kevalay Queen since 2021. |
| Corsica Victoria | 1973 | 1986–2023 | Queen Rinas since 2024. |
| Sardinia Vera | 1975 | 1987–2024 | Scrapped in Aliaga, Turkey in 2024. |
| Corsica Marina Seconda | 1974 | 1986–2024 | Al Jabara for Tarco Marine since 2025. |
| MS Mega Express Five | 1993 | 2009–2026 | Mega X for Bridgemans Services Group since 2026. |

== Routes ==
- Corsica
  - Nice–Bastia
  - Nice–L'Île-Rousse
  - Nice–Porto-Vecchio
  - Toulon–Ajaccio
  - Toulon–Bastia
  - Toulon–L'Île-Rousse
  - Toulon–Porto-Vecchio
  - Livorno–Bastia
  - Livorno–L'Île-Rousse
  - Savona–Bastia
- Sardinia
  - Livorno–Golfo Aranci
  - Toulon–Porto Torres
- Balearic Islands
  - Toulon–Alcudia
  - Toulon–Menorca
