= Lion Ferry =

Swedish ferry company

Lion Ferry Ab
- Founded: 1959
- Defunct: 1998
- Fate: Rebranded as Stena Line
- Headquarters: Halmstad, Sweden
- Area served: Kattegat
- Services: Passenger transportation Freight transportation
- Parent: 1959–1985: Bonnier Group; 1985–1998: Stena Line

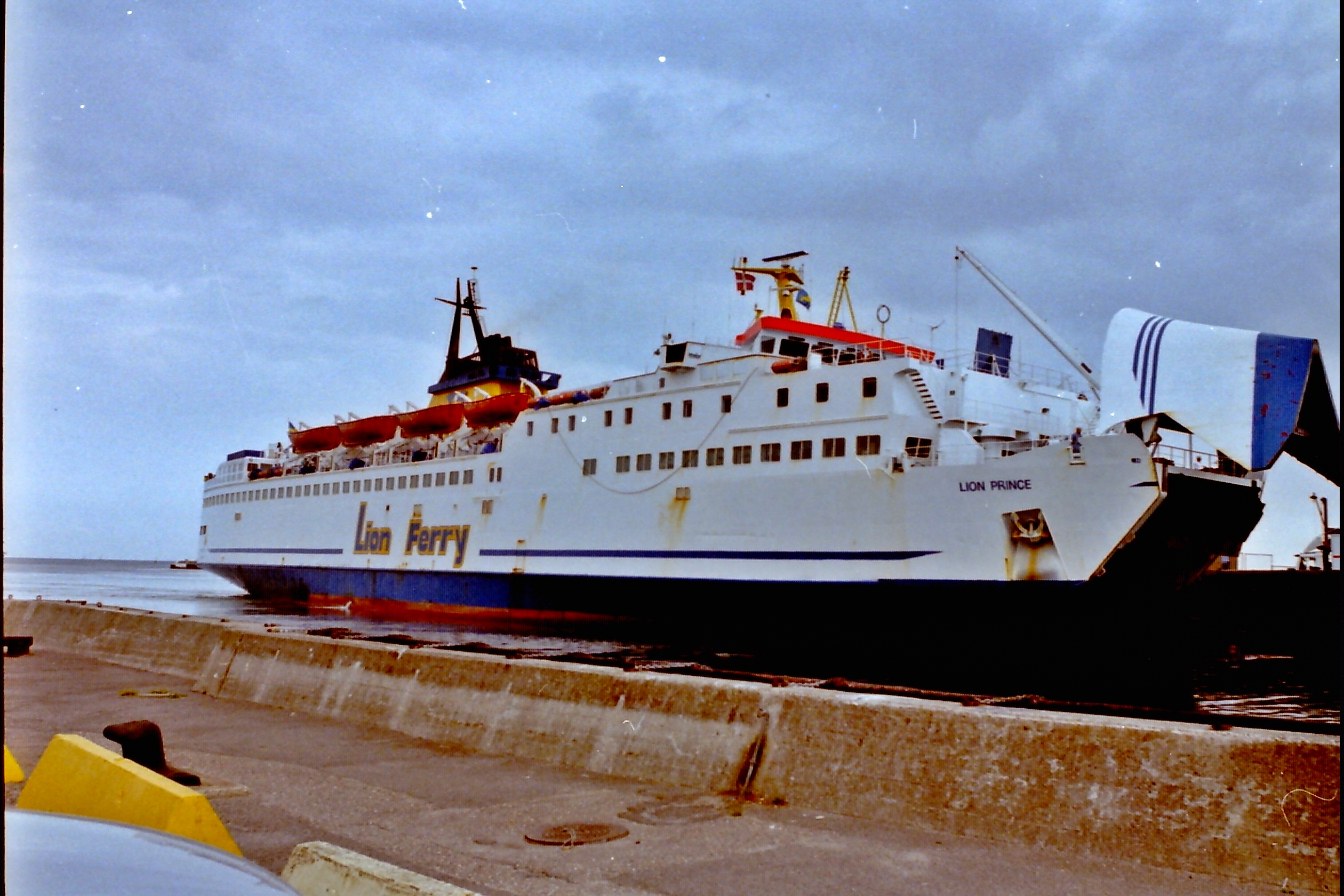
Lion Prince, a ferry of Lion Ferry in Sweden

Lion Ferry was a Swedish ferry company which operated passenger and freight ferry services in Scandinavia and North America.

== History ==
In 1960 The Prins Bertil entered service between Halmstad in Sweden and the Danish port of Aarhus. The company acquired Norwegian ferry operator Europafergen in 1965.

Between 1970 and 1976 Lion operated a route between Portland, Maine and Yarmouth, Nova Scotia using the Prince of Fundy. In 1973 it started a joint venture with Irish Shipping to form Irish Continental Line and in 1985 was acquired by Stena Line

In 1995 the company began to operate between Karlskrona in Sweden and Gdynia in Poland route in 1995. In 1997 Lion Ferry services were rebranded as Stena Line.

== Routes ==
Lion Ferry operated various routes during its 39 years in operation.

- Halmstad – Aarhus
- Halmstad – Grenå
- Varberg – Grenå
- Karlskrona – Gdynia
- Portland, Maine – Yarmouth, Nova Scotia
- Bremerhaven – Harwich (marketed as Prinzen Line)

== Fleet ==
Lion Ferry operated many vessels during its time in operation.

Name	Built	In service with Lion	Tonnage	Notes
MS Prins Bertil	1960	1960–1964	2,355 GRT	Chartered in 1964 to Red AB Nordö as M/S Calmar Nyckel. Sold 1965 to Red AB Nordö.
MS Prins Bertil	1964	1964–1966	3,625 GRT	Sold to Canadian National in 1966 and renamed Leif Eirikson.
MS Varberg	1940	1964–1966	1,217 GRT	
MS Europafergen	1960	1965–1978	2,209 GRT	
MS Gustav Vasa	1965	1965–1971	3,801 GRT	Broken up in 2004.
MS Kronprins Carl Gustaf	1966	1966–1971	3,801 GRT	
MS Prins Hamlet	1966	1966–1969	8,687 GRT	Broken up in 2002.
MS Europafärjan II	1964	1970–1976	2,498 GRT	
MS Prins Oberon	1970	1970–1978	7,993 GRT	Has since operated as casino ship Ambassador II in Florida.
MS Prince of Fundy	1970	1970–1978	5,464 GRT	Broken up in 2005.
MS Gustav Vasa	1973	1973–1983	7,457 GRT	Converted to book ship Logos Hope
MS Svealand	1973	1973–1982	5,159 GRT	Has since operated in the Adriatic Sea as the Seatrade
MS Europafärjan III	1974	1974–1983	4,774 GRT	Has since been operated by Moby Lines as Moby Niki
MS Europafärjan; MS Europafärjan II; MS Lion Princess	1971	1983–1985; 1985–1987; 1987–1994	8,772 GRT	Has since operated for Color Line as Bohus
MS Lion Queen	1967	1988–1989; 1994–1997	14,193 GRT	Scrapped in Alang in 2021.
MS Europafärjan I MS Lion Prince	1969	1985–1987; 1987–1997	5,679 GRT	
MS Lion King; MS Lion King II	1986	1995–1996; 1996	11,763 GRT	Has since served on the Varberg – Grenå route as the Stena Nautica
MS Lion King	1979	1996–1997	10,604 GRT	
MS Lion Europe	1981	1997	14,378 GRT	Has since served with Stena Line as Stena Europe
