= Orto dei Semplici Elbano =

Botanical garden in Italy

Coordinates: 42°49′N 10°24′E

The Orto dei Semplici Elbano (1 hectare) is a botanical garden located at 160 meters elevation next to the Eremo di Santa Caterina in Rio nell'Elba on the island of Elba, Province of Livorno, Italy. It is open daily except Mondays in the warmer months; an admission fee is charged.

The garden was established in 1997 for the study of the bio-diversity of plants on Elba and elsewhere in the Tuscan Archipelago. It contains medicinal plants and fruit trees, as well as spontaneous and naturalized species.

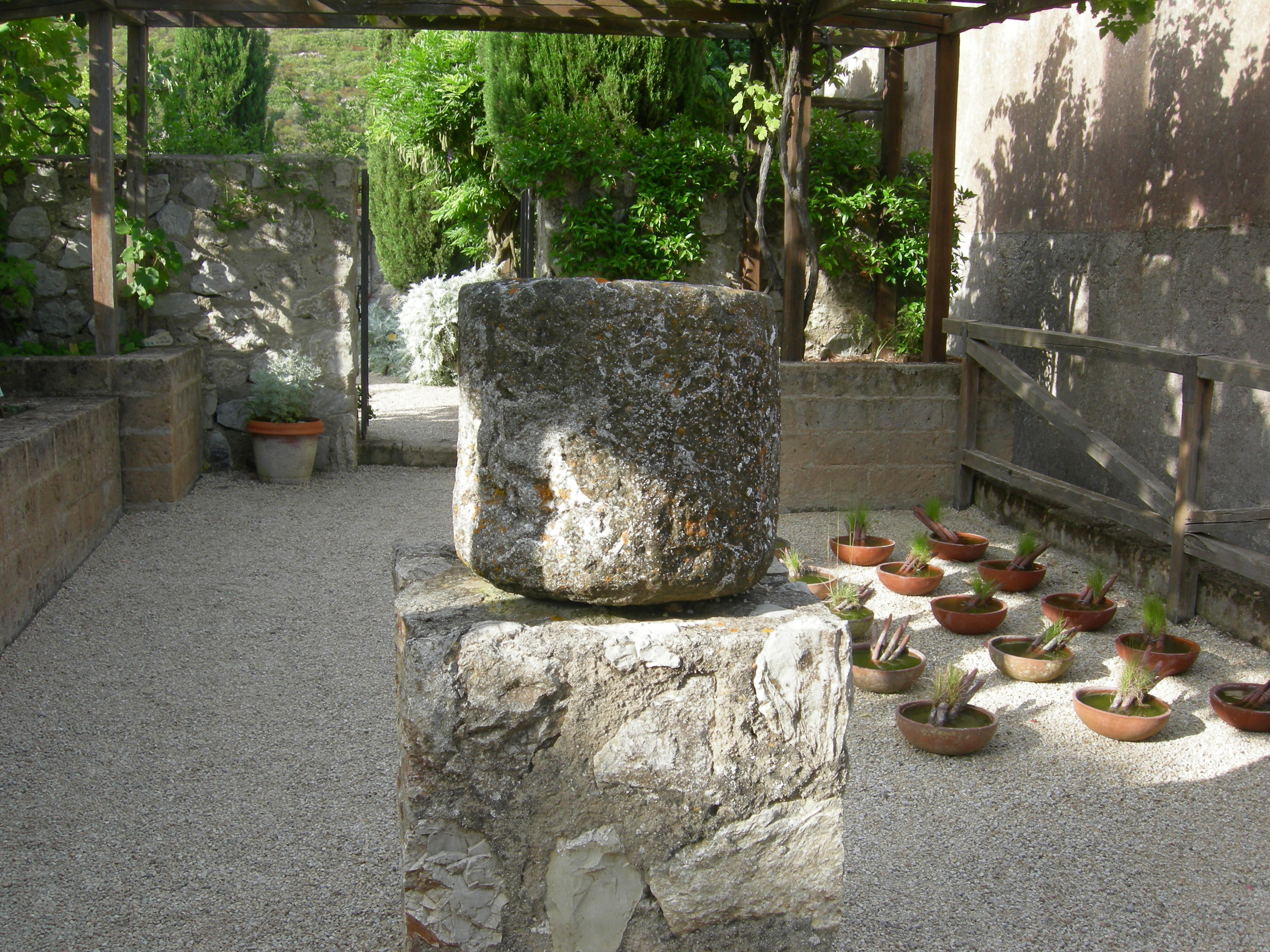
Orto dei Semplici Elbano

== See also ==
- List of botanical gardens in Italy
