= San Giovanni, Portoferraio =

San Giovanni
- Frazione
- Location of San Giovanni in Italy
- Coordinates: 42°47′34″N 10°19′19″E
- Country: Italy
- Region: Tuscany
- Province: Livorno (LI)
- Comune: Portoferraio
- Elevation: 2 m (6.6 ft)

Population (2011)
  - Total: 695
- Time zone: UTC+1 (CET)
  - Summer (DST): UTC+2 (CEST)
- Postal code: 57037
- Dialing code: (+39) 0565

San Giovanni is a village in Tuscany, central Italy, administratively a frazione of the comune of Portoferraio, province of Livorno. At the time of the 2011 census its population was 695.

San Giovanni is located on the Elba Island about 3 km east from Portoferraio.

== Bibliography ==
- Guide d'Italia. Toscana. Milan: Touring Club Italiano. 2012. p. 465.
