= Portoferraio =

Portoferraio Ferajo/Feraja (Elban)
- Comune
- Comune di Portoferraio
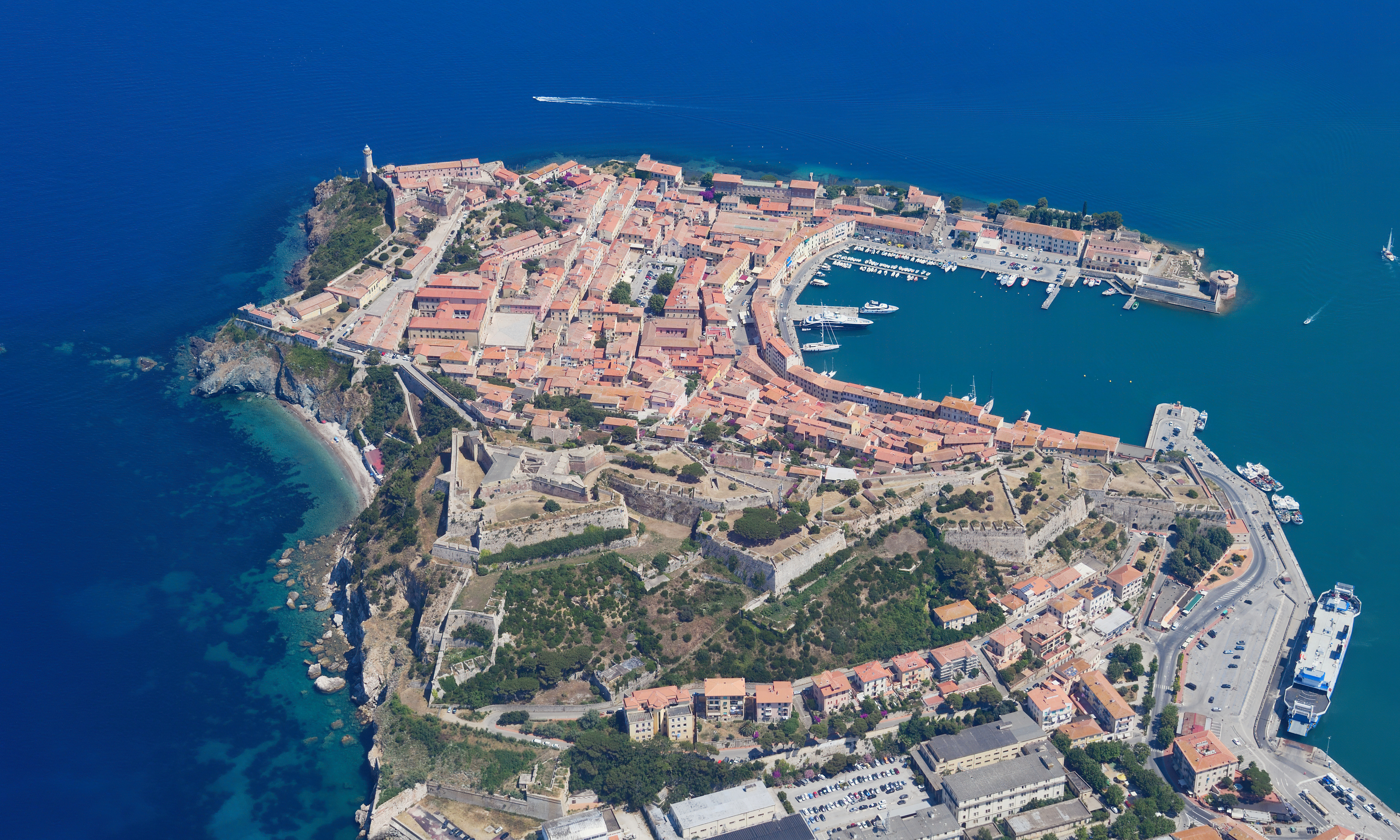
- Aerial view of Portoferraio

- Coat of arms

- Location within Italy Location within Tuscany
- Coordinates: 42°49′N 10°19′E
- Country: Italy
- Region: Tuscany
- Province: Livorno (LI)
- Frazioni: Bagnaia, Magazzini, Montecristo, San Giovanni, Scaglieri

Government
  - Mayor: Mario Ferrari

Area
  - Total: 48.48 km^{2} (18.72 sq mi)
- Elevation: 4 m (13 ft)

Population (2026)
  - Total: 11,748
  - Density: 242.3/km^{2} (627.6/sq mi)
- Demonym: Portoferraiesi
- Time zone: UTC+1 (CET)
  - Summer (DST): UTC+2 (CEST)
- Postal code: 57037
- Dialing code: 0565
- Patron saint: St. Cristinus
- Saint day: 29 April
- Website: Official website

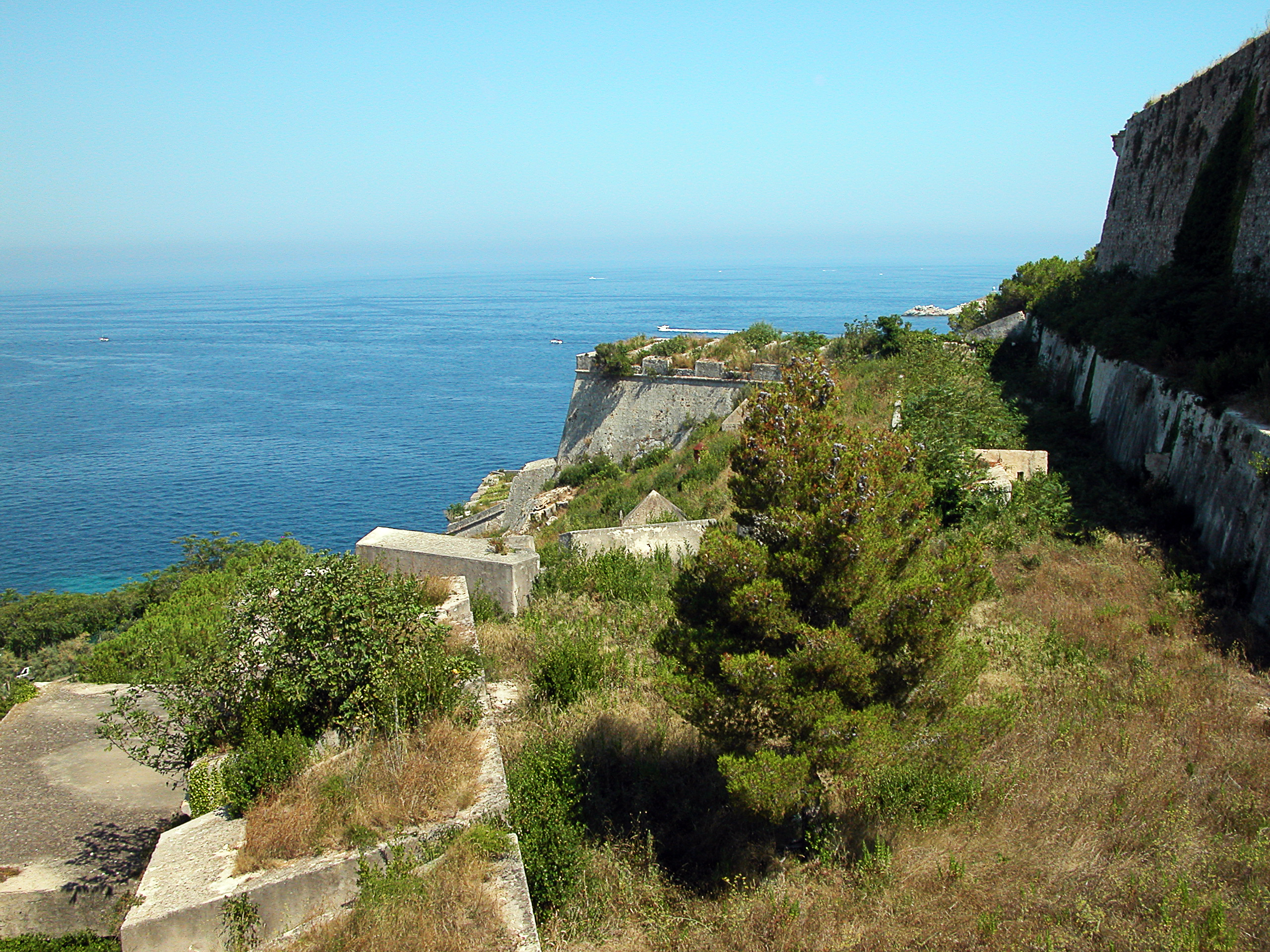
View of the Medici fortifications.

Portoferraio (Italian pronunciation: [ˌpɔrtoferˈraːjo], Elban dialect: Ferajo/Feraja) is a town and comune (municipality) on the edge of the eponymous harbour of the island of Elba, in the province of Livorno in the region of Tuscany in Italy. It is the island's largest municipality. Because of its terrain, many of its buildings are situated on the slopes of a tiny hill bordered on three sides by the sea. It has 11,748 inhabitants.

Portoferraio borders the municipalities of Campo nell'Elba, Capoliveri, Marciana, Porto Azzurro, and Rio.

== History ==
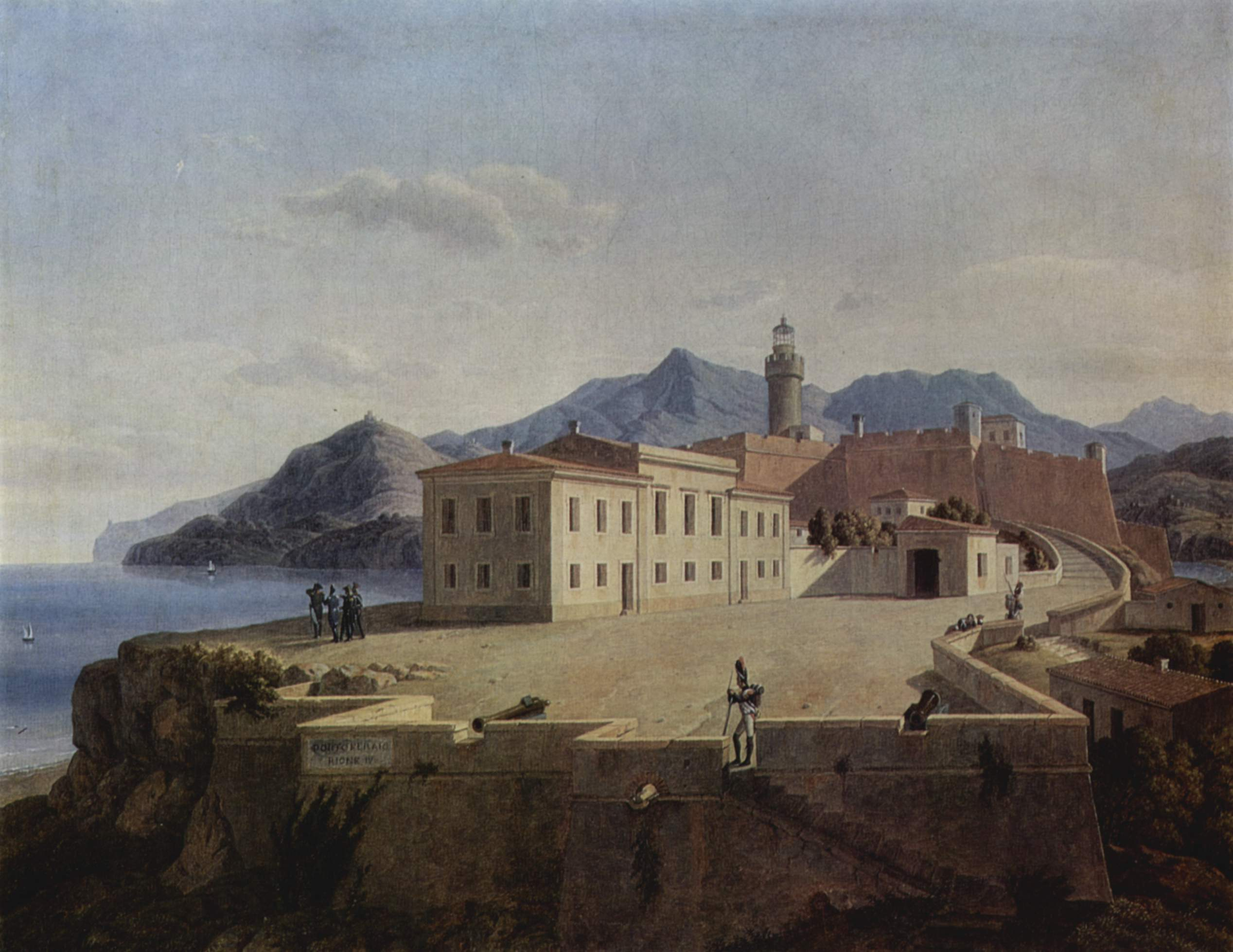
Napoleon in Portoferraio, Leo von Klenze, 1839.

It was founded by Cosimo I de' Medici, Grand Duke of Tuscany, in 1548, with the name of Cosmopoli ("Cosimo's City"), to balance the presence of the Spanish citadel in Porto Azzurro. It had three forts (Forte Stella, Forte Falcone, and Forte Inglese) and a massive line of walls, all still visible today.

The name evolved from Ferraia in Etruscan times, Fabricia with Romans and Ferraio with Grand Duchy of Tuscany.

The city remained attached to the Grand Duchy of Tuscany until the late 18th century, when, due to its strategic position, it came into contention with France, Great Britain, and Austria. A British garrison withstood the Siege of Porto Ferrajo in 1801, but the 1802 Treaty of Amiens transferred the town to France. In 1814 it was handed over to Napoleon Bonaparte, as the seat of his first exile. In the 19th century, the city grew quickly, due to the construction of infrastructures and the exploitation of new iron mills in Rio Marina. Portoferraio then became the main shipping port of the ore to the mainland, whence the current name, meaning "Iron Port" in Italian. After the end of the Napoleonic Era, Portoferraio returned to Tuscany and became part of the Kingdom of Italy in 1860. Here brigand Carmine Crocco was imprisoned until his death for his revolution against the reign of Victor Emmanuel II and the anarchist Giovanni Passannante who attempted to kill King Umberto I.

During World War II, Portoferraio became the scene of battle when Elba was occupied by German forces. In late June 1944, an Allied force composed mainly of Free French troops liberated the island in a fight that lasted two days. Portoferraio was taken by French troops on 18 June but was damaged by the fighting and the bombing raids which preceded the invasion.

Portoferraio's economy suffered from the end of mining activities starting from the 1970s, but in the following decades, it gained status as an internationally renowned seaside destination.

== Demographics ==
As of 2026, the population is 11,748, of which 48.9% are male, and 51.1% are female. Minors make up 13.3% of the population, and seniors make up 27.0%.

Historical population

Year	Pop.	±%
1861	5,057	—
1871	6,013	+18.9%
1881	5,563	−7.5%
1901	6,148	+10.5%
1911	9,544	+55.2%
1921	8,942	−6.3%
1931	11,323	+26.6%
1936	11,825	+4.4%

Year	Pop.	±%
1951	10,385	−12.2%
1961	10,272	−1.1%
1971	10,629	+3.5%
1981	10,839	+2.0%
1991	11,042	+1.9%
2001	11,508	+4.2%
2011	11,641	+1.2%
2021	11,864	+1.9%

Source: ISTAT

=== Immigration ===
As of 2025, immigrants make up 11.5% of the population. The 5 largest foreign countries of birth are Ukraine, Moldova, Romania, Morocco, and Albania.

=== Jewish community ===
The first Jews arrived in Portoferraio at the beginning of the 17th century following the publication of the edict of 1556 in which Cosimo I de' Medici granted special privileges to all those who settled in Cosmopoli. In 1593, Ferdinando I de' Medici issued letters patent, called La Livornina, by which more privileges were granted to foreign merchants, Jews in particular, who were willing to settle in the new free ports on Elba and in Leghorn.

The first synagogue was built in 1631–1632 when there were barely over ten Jewish families living on the island. At the beginning of the 18th century, the Jewish community numbered more than 50 people.

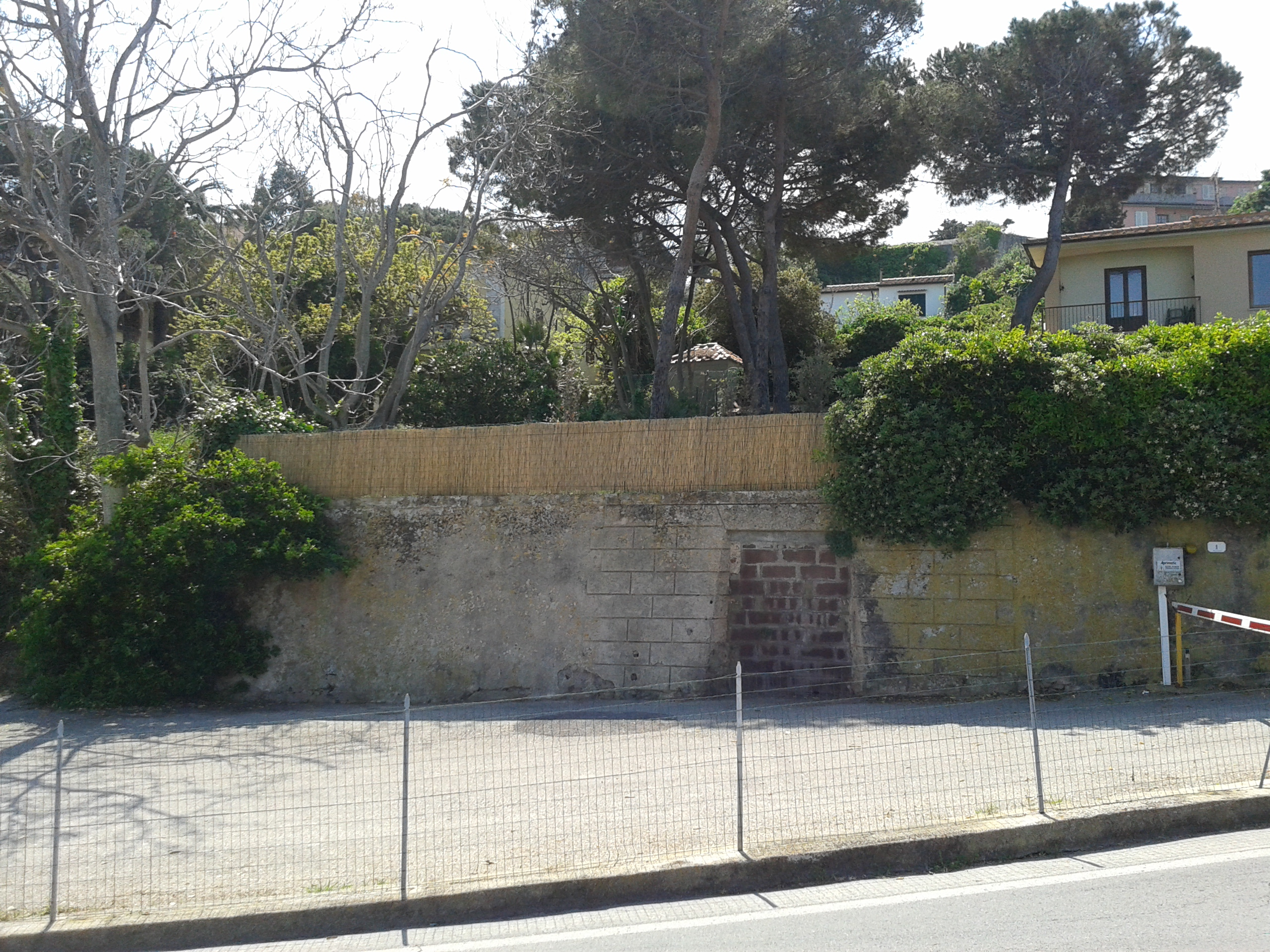
The surrounding wall and the bricked-up door of the Jewish cemetery on Via de Gasperi 1.

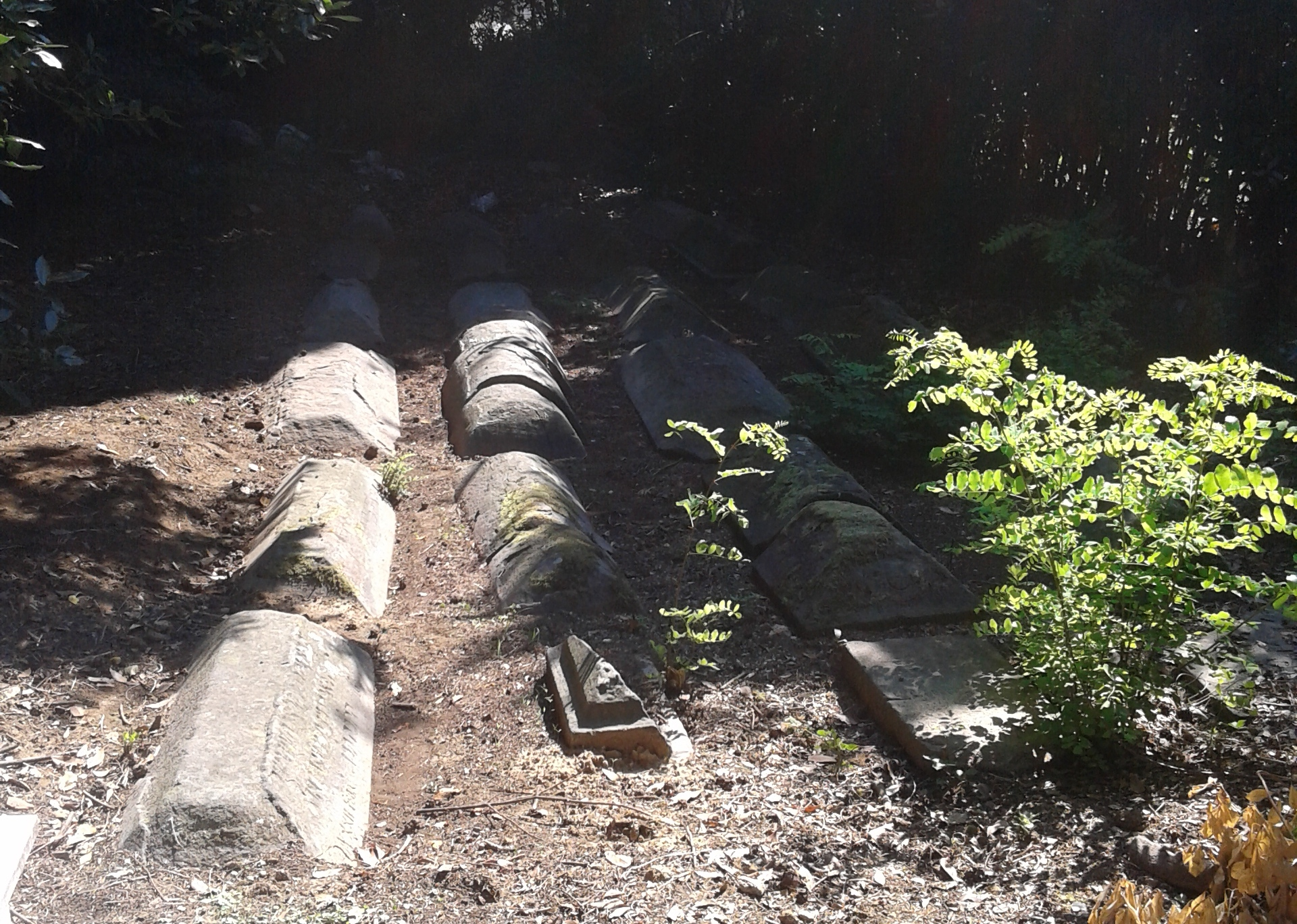
Tombs from the Jewish cemetery in Portoferraio, now in Cemetery dei Lupi in Leghorn

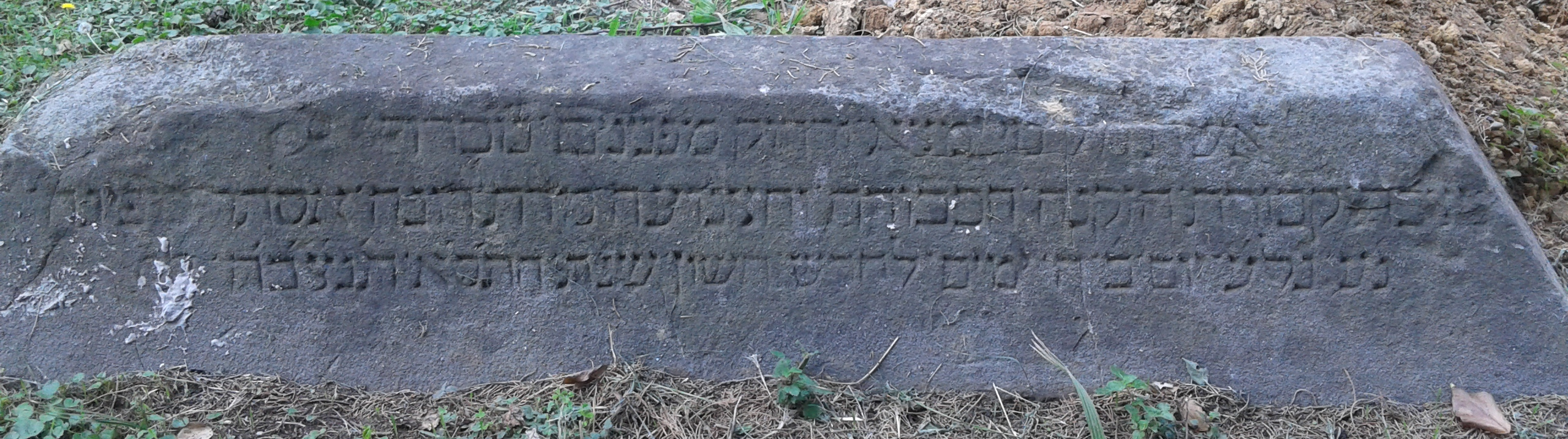
Tomb transferred in 1964 from the Jewish cemetery in Portoferraio to the Cimitero dei Lupi in Leghorn. Translation: Who will find a lady of value? Her value is much higher than pearls! Gravestone of the old, honored and modest lady Dona Ester da Pisa. Her rest be in Eden. Departed on Monday 5 of the month of Cheshwan of year 5465 (November 5, 1704). May her soul be bound up in the bond of life

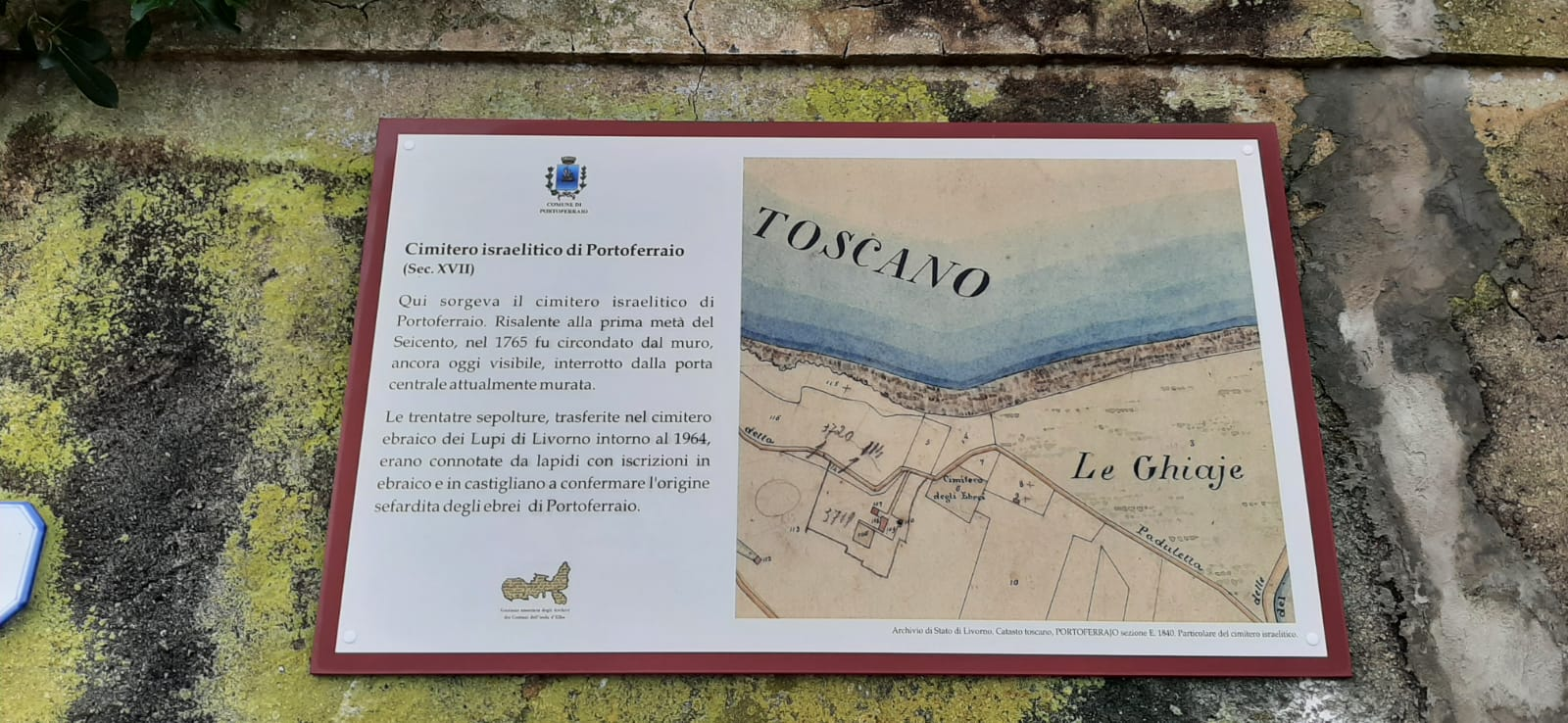
Panel installed on the wall of the Jewish cemetery in Portoferraio on January 27, 2023

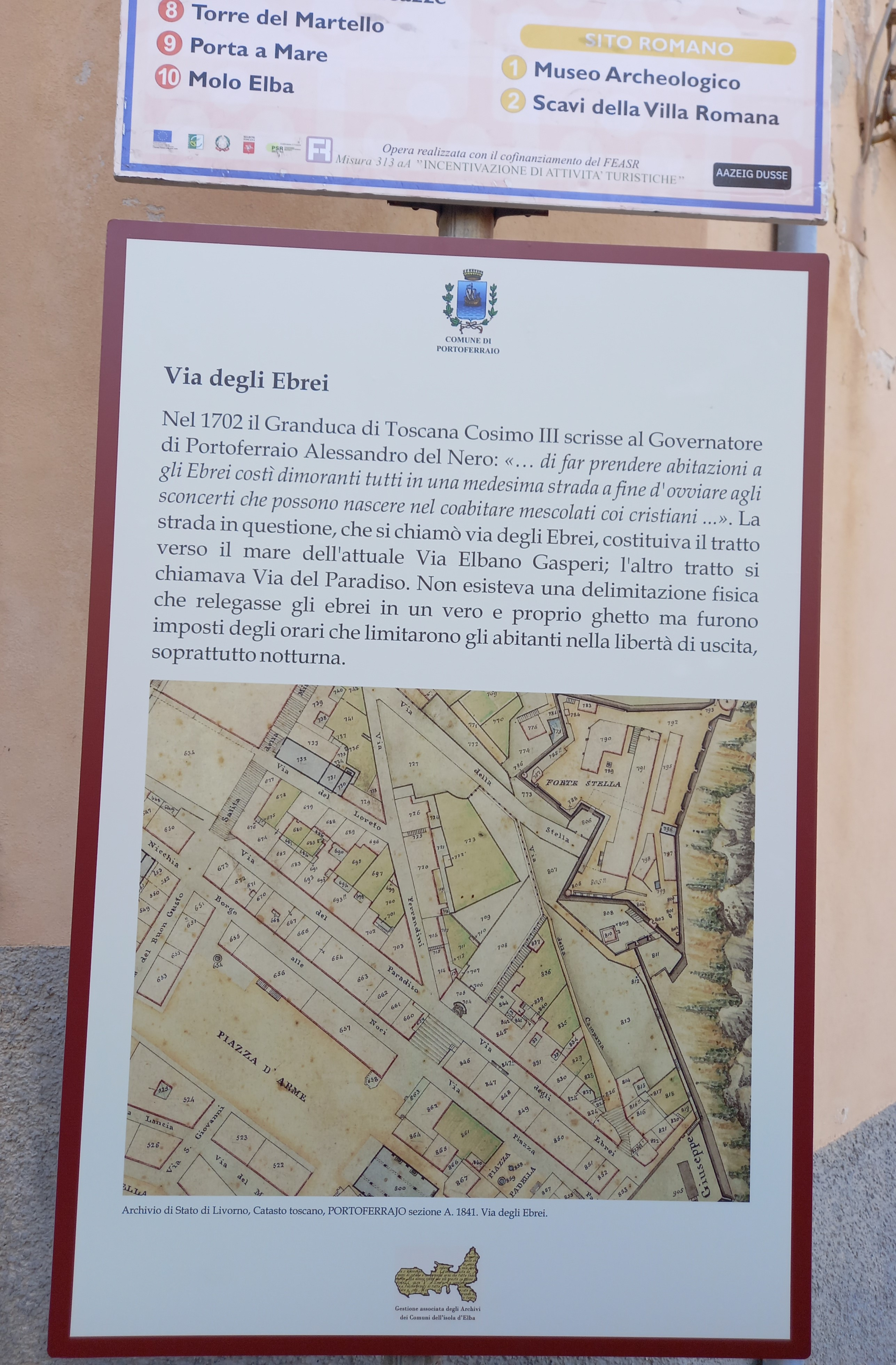
Panel installed in via Elbano Gasperi, before via degli Ebrei, on January 27, 2023

In 1702, by order of the Grand Duke, the Jews of Portoferraio were required to live on a designated street, Via degli Ebrei or Street of the Hebrews (now called via Elbano Gasperi) which constituted a small ghetto which they were not allowed to leave after 1 o’clock in the morning. At about this time, Abraham Pardo, son of Isaac, was forbidden to build a new synagogue near the church. He was forced to build it in a garden behind his home, below Fort Stella. All Jewish rituals were celebrated in the synagogue and were attended by Jews from Piombino, Maremme and the rest of the island of Elba. The ecclesiastical authorities sought to isolate the Jewish community by preventing Christians from having any contact with the Jewish community. There were restrictions on all workers and in particular on wet nurses who had to apply for special dispensations from the Vicar Forane.

In 1765, authorization was granted to build a wall around a field designated for use as a Jewish cemetery. The field was situated over the Ponticello ditch, behind Ghiaie beach on the site of the present-day Hotel Villa Ombrosa. The wall with its central door is still visible. Until 1954, there was an inscription on the door which read: Cimitero Israelitico. In 1964, the remaining tombs, about 40 of them, with their inscriptions in Hebrew and Spanish and dating from 1646 to the end of the 19th century, were transferred to the new Jewish cemetery in Livorno. The ground was deconsecrated and sold by the Jewish community to a neighbor. It is now the garden of the villa behind it.

In 1826, the Governor, at the request of the heads of 10 Jewish families, drew up a set of rules for the Jewish community. The rules were approved by the Grand Duke, Leopold II who nominated two massari ("bailiffs") to represent the community.

In the second half of the 18th century, the Jewish community declined in number due to the worsening of economic conditions on the island. Peace had been signed with the Ottoman Empire resulting in a reduction of military garrisons and the suppression of the “compagnia urbana” made up of 180 men.

At the beginning of the 20th century, the construction of a steel mill attracted new Jewish families to the island. However, due to the anti-Jewish laws and persecutions, these families left the island. Alfonso Preziosi, in his book, cited above, wrote “generally, the Jews found the island of Elba to be an oasis of peace thanks to the privileges granted by the Medici and the Lorraine which allowed them to develop their trade with Eastern ports.”

On January 27, 2023, the mayor of Portoferraio attended on the occasion of Remembrance Day the installation of two historical-informative panels on the surrounding wall of the cemetery and in via Elbano Gasperi where the Ghetto was located in memory of the presence of the Jews.

== Main sights ==
The town center is crowded around the small marina lying in a natural cove.

Main points of interest include:

- Forte Stella
- Forte Falcone
- Forte Inglese
- Archeological museum
- Napoleon's house

== Portoferraio lighthouse ==
The lighthouse stands on the northern rampart of Forte Stella built in 1548 by Cosimo I de' Medici. It was built by Leopold II Grand Duke of Tuscany in 1788; the stone tower is 25 metres high and has a double balcony and lantern. The lighthouse is fully automated, operated by Marina Militare and identified by the code number 2072 E.F.; the lantern is 63 metres above sea level and emits a group of three white lightning strikes in a 14-second period visible up to 16 nautical miles (roughly 30 km). On the same tower is an additional light identified by the number 2072.2.E.F. that emits a red fixed light at 60 metres above sea level.
