= Rio, Italy =

Rio
- Comune
- Comune di Rio
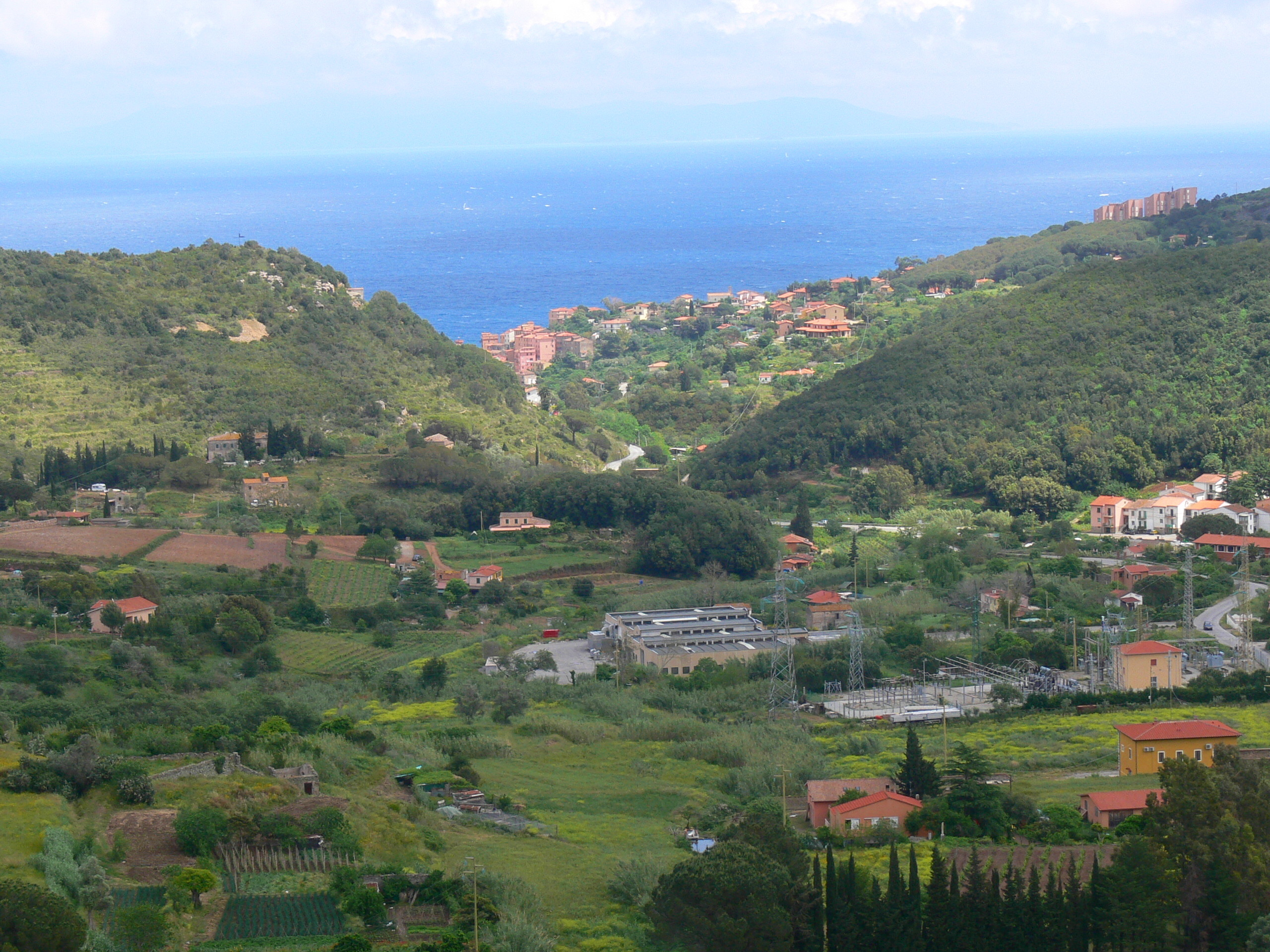
- View of Rio Marina

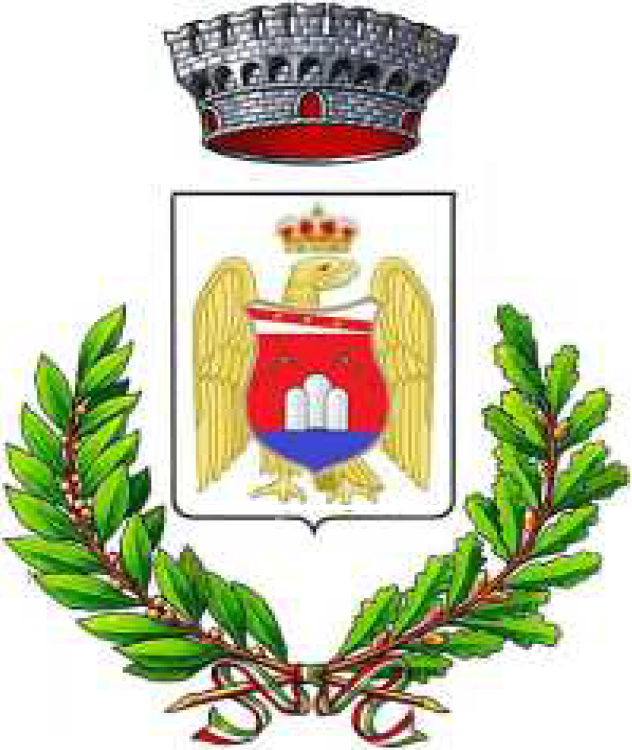
- Coat of arms

- Location within Italy Location within Tuscany
- Coordinates: 42°49′N 10°25′E
- Country: Italy
- Region: Tuscany
- Province: Livorno (LI)
- Frazioni: Bagnaia, Cavo, Nisportino, Nisporto, Rio Marina, Rio nell'Elba

Government
  - Mayor: Girolamo Bonfissuto (Special Commissioner)

Area
  - Total: 36.52 km^{2} (14.10 sq mi)
- Elevation: 10 m (33 ft)

Population (2026)
  - Total: 3,427
  - Density: 93.84/km^{2} (243.0/sq mi)
- Demonym: Riesi
- Time zone: UTC+1 (CET)
  - Summer (DST): UTC+2 (CEST)
- Postal code: 57038; 57039
- Dialing code: 0565
- Website: Official website

Rio is a comune (municipality) on the island of Elba, in the Province of Livorno in the region of Tuscany in Italy. It has 3,427 inhabitants.

The municipality is formed by the towns of Rio Marina, Rio nell'Elba, Cavo and Bagnaia, and the villages of Capo d'Arco, Nisportino, Nisporto and Ortano. Rio also includes the small islands of Cerboli and Palmaiola.

It was established in January 2018.

== Demographics ==
As of 2026, the population is 3,427, of which 50.9% are male, and 49.1% are female. Minors make up 10.3% of the population, and seniors make up 31.9%.

Historical population

Year	Pop.	±%
1861	5,021	—
1871	5,380	+7.1%
1881	6,584	+22.4%
1901	6,583	−0.0%
1911	7,638	+16.0%
1921	7,460	−2.3%
1931	6,241	−16.3%
1936	5,810	−6.9%

Year	Pop.	±%
1951	5,134	−11.6%
1961	4,985	−2.9%
1971	3,710	−25.6%
1981	3,224	−13.1%
1991	2,909	−9.8%
2001	3,102	+6.6%
2011	3,405	+9.8%
2021	3,315	−2.6%

Source: ISTAT

=== Immigration ===
As of 2025, immigrants make up 11.6% of the population. The 5 largest foreign countries of birth are Romania, Moldova, Ukraine, Germany, and Switzerland.
