= Rio nell'Elba =

- Frazione
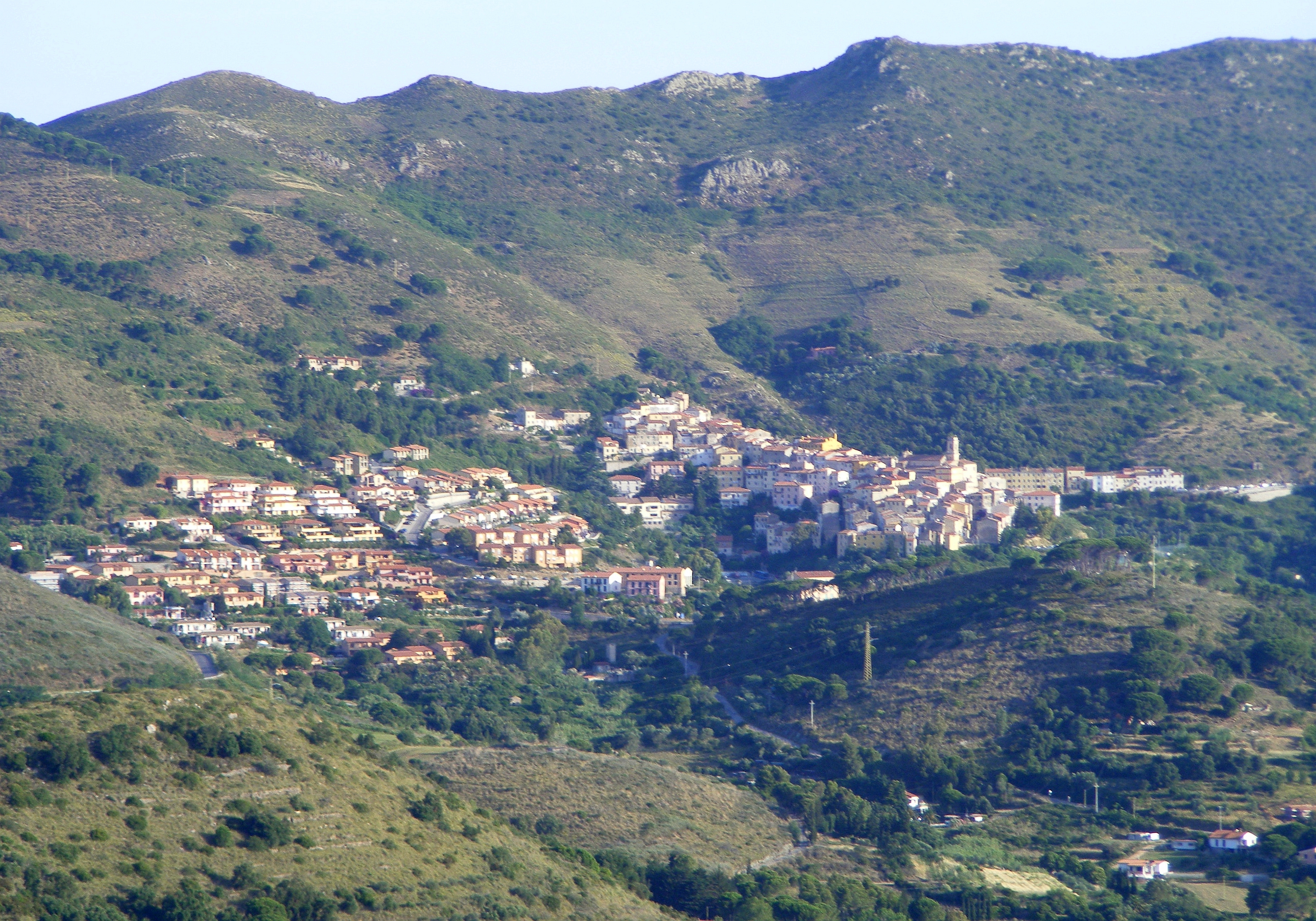
- Panorama of Rio nell'Elba

- Location of Rio nell'Elba in Italy
- Coordinates: 42°49′N 10°24′E
- Country: Italy
- Region: Tuscany
- Province: Livorno (LI)
- Comune: Rio
- Elevation: 165 m (541 ft)

Population (October 2011)
  - Total: 782
- Demonym: Riesi
- Time zone: UTC+1 (CET)
  - Summer (DST): UTC+2 (CEST)
- Postal code: 57039
- Dialing code: 0565
- Patron saint: St. James
- Saint day: July 25

Rio nell'Elba is a frazione of the comune of Rio, in the Province of Livorno in the Italian region Tuscany, located about 130 kilometres (81 mi) southwest of Florence and about 80 kilometres (50 mi) south of Livorno.

== Main sights ==
- Orto dei Semplici Elbano, a botanical garden
