= MS Ionian Star =

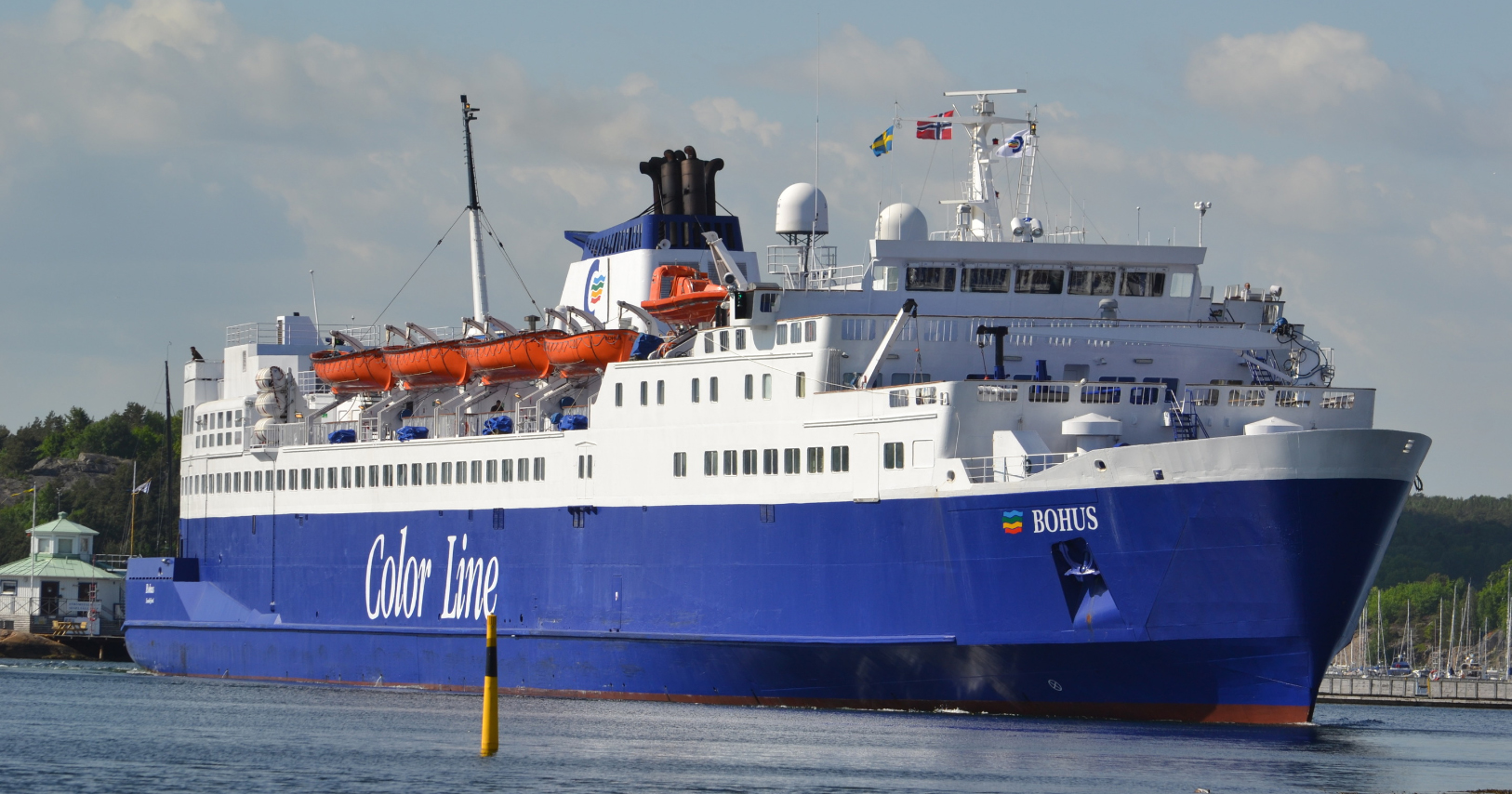
- MS Bohus at Strömstad

History
- Name: 1971-1983: Prinsessan Desirée; 1983-1985: Europafärjän; 1985-1987: Europafärjan II; 1987-1994: Lion Princess; 1994-2019: Bohus; 2019-present: Ionian Star
- Operator: 1971-1981: Sessan Linjen; 1981-1981: B&I Line; 1981-1981: Sealink; 1981-1982: Stena Line; 1982-1982: Sally Line; 1982-1993: Lion Ferry; 1993-1999: Scandi Line; 1999-2019: Color Line; 2019-present: Tnitsea Shipping/Seamed Trading Shipping SRL Panama
- Port of registry: 1971-1993: Gothenburg Sweden; 1993-2019: Sandefjord Norway; 2019-present: Panama
- Builder: Aalborg Værft A/S, Danmark
- Yard number: 190
- Completed: 1971
- In service: 1971
- Identification: IMO number: 7037806
- Status: In service

General characteristics
- Tonnage: 9,149 GT
- Length: 123.40 m (404 ft 10 in)
- Beam: 19.20 m (63 ft 0 in)
- Draught: 5.40 m (17 ft 9 in)
- Installed power: 8 × NOHAB SF 112 diesels
- Propulsion: 2 × controllable pitch propellers; 1 × bow thruster
- Speed: 21 kn (38.89 km/h; 24.17 mph)
- Capacity: 1,165 passengers; 240 cars

MS Ionian Star is a ferry built 1971 by Aalborg Vaerft as Prinsessan Désirée for Swedish Sessanlinjen's ferry service between Gothenburg and Frederikshavn. Later she sailed between Vaberg and Grena as Europafärjan and Europafärjan II. After Stena Line took over this route, she was used by the in-house company Lion Ferry as Lion Princess between Karlskrona and Gdynia. Since 1994 her name was Bohus, operating for Scandi Line between Sandefjord and Strömstad. eingesetzt. 1999 Color Scandi Line was created and since 2000 the ship sailed for Color Line.

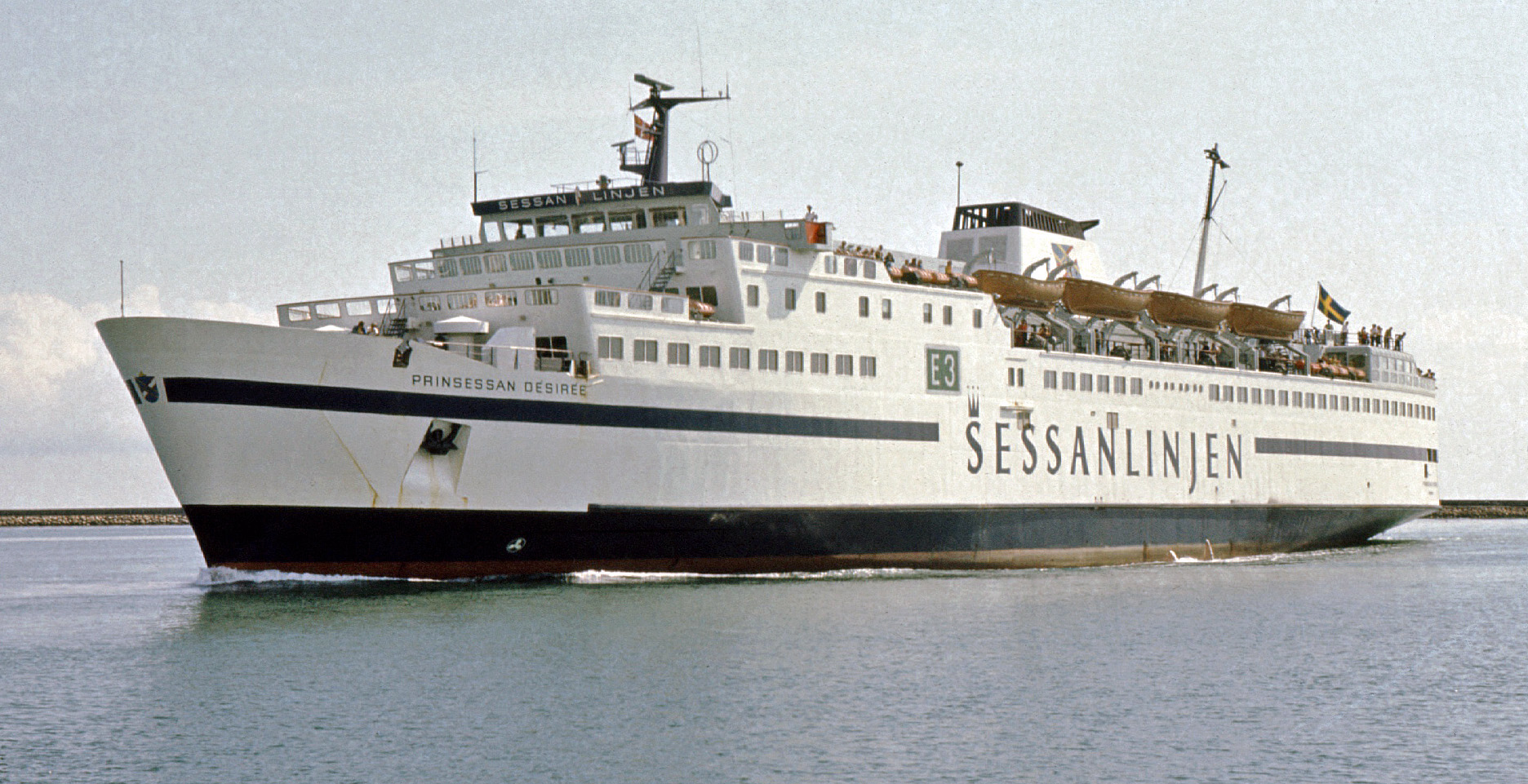
Prinsessan Désirée at Frederikshavn in 1976

2019 the ship was sold to European Ferries. In August she was renamed Ionian Star and sailed under Panama flag between Brindisi in Italy and Vlora in Albania.
