= Rio Marina =

- Frazione
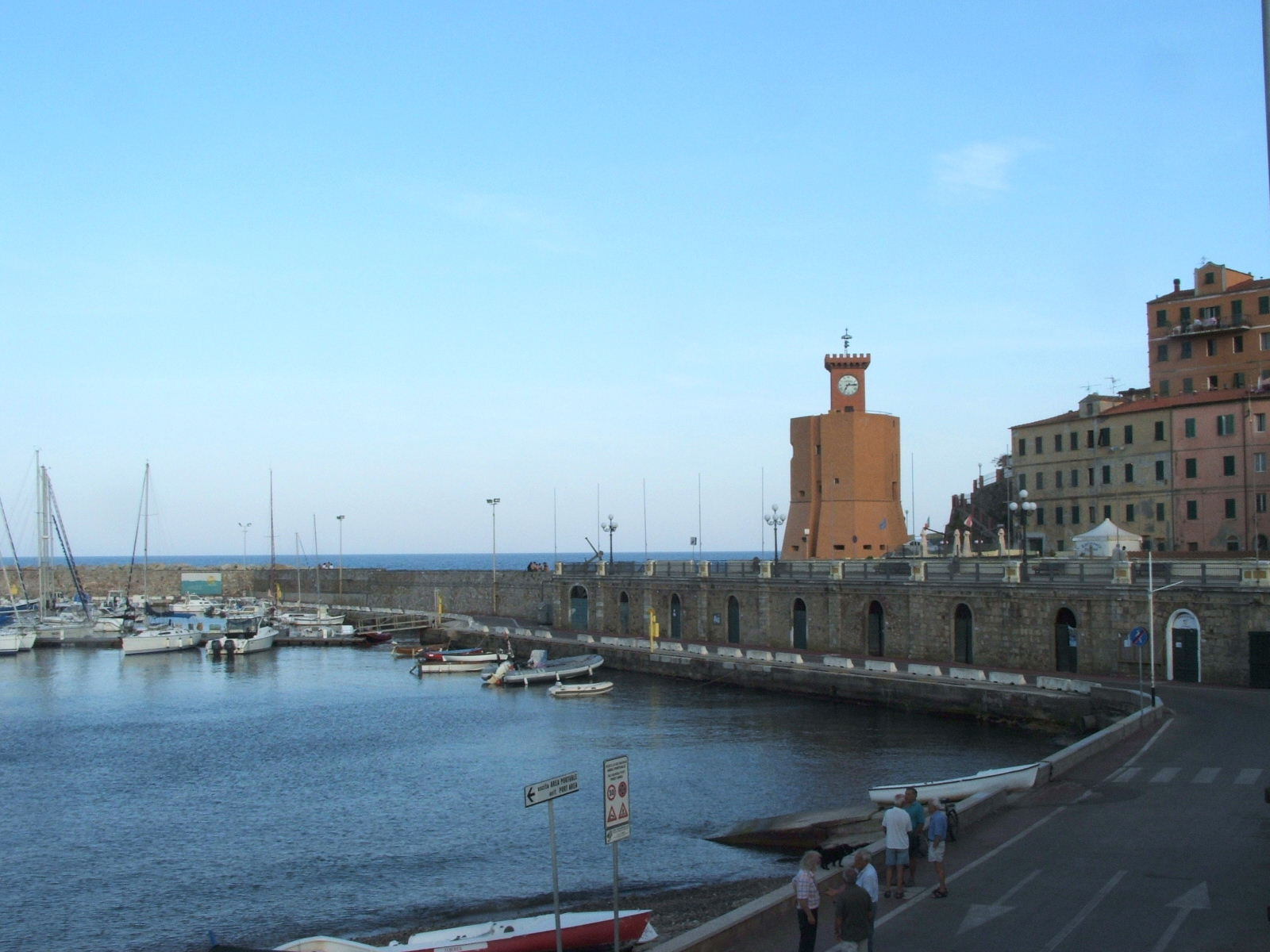

- Location of Rio Marina in Italy
- Coordinates: 42°49′N 10°25′E
- Country: Italy
- Region: Tuscany
- Province: Livorno (LI)
- Comune: Rio
- Elevation: 10 m (33 ft)

Population (October 2011)
  - Total: 1,220
- Demonym: Riesi
- Time zone: UTC+1 (CET)
  - Summer (DST): UTC+2 (CEST)
- Postal code: 57038
- Dialing code: 0565
- Patron saint: St. Barbara, St. Roch (mines)
- Saint day: 4 December, 16 August

Rio Marina is a frazione of the comune of Rio, in the Province of Livorno in the Italian region Tuscany, located on the island of Elba.

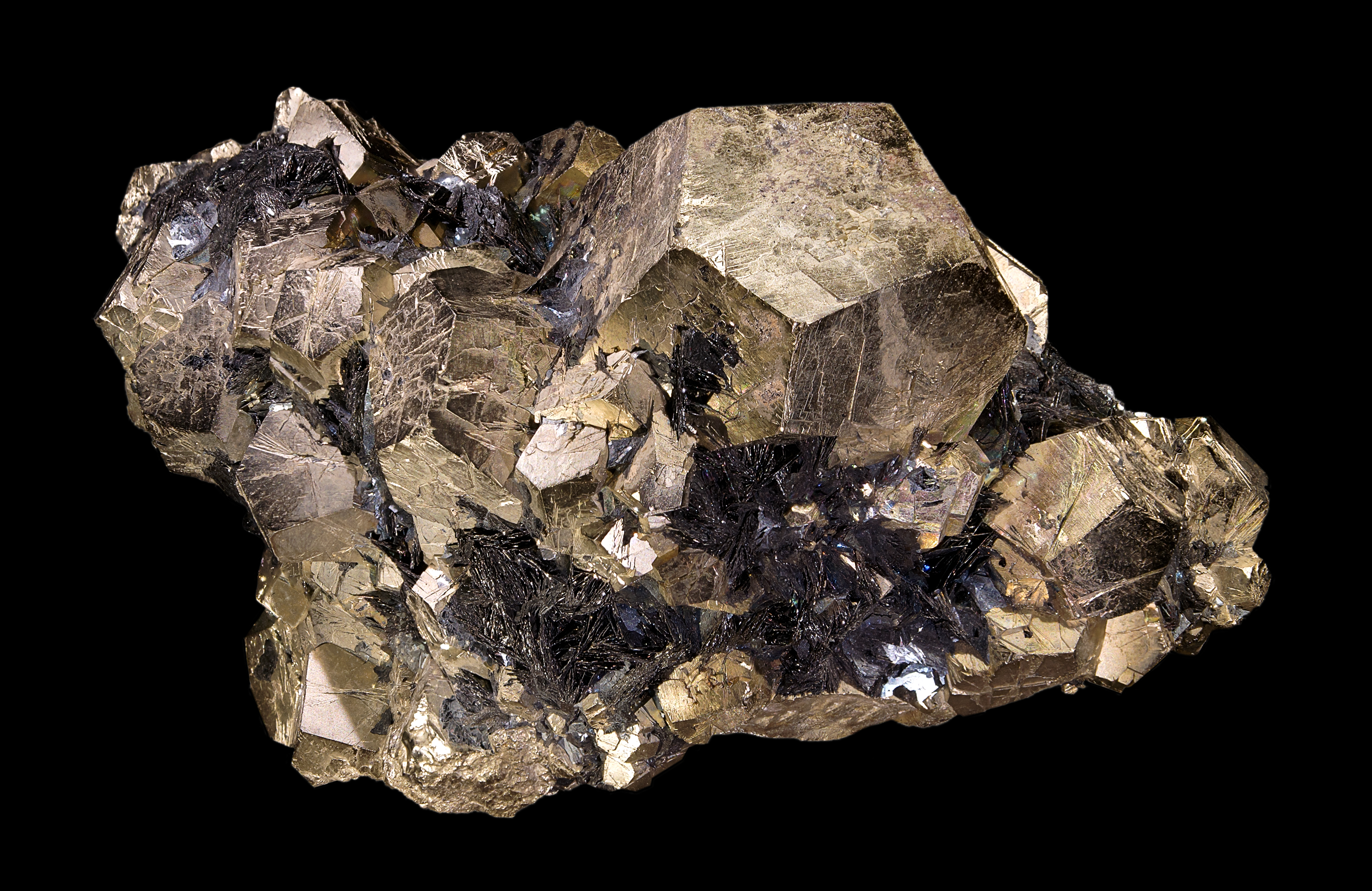
Pyrite and Hematite from Rio Marina.

== History ==
The first traces of settlements in the area date to the 15th century. In the 18th century, when pirate menace started to wane, a village grew here as the port of the nearby Rio nell'Elba.

The village had 879 inhabitants at the time of the French invasion of 1799. In that period the exploiting of iron ores began. The mines closed in 1981, and now Rio Marina's economy is mostly based on tourism.
