= Flag of Elba =

Flag of the island during Napoleon's rule

- Proportion: 2:3
- Adopted: 4 May 1814
- Design: White, divided diagonally by a red stripe that starts from the upper side of the flagpole on which there are three golden bees.
- Designed by: Napoleon Bonaparte

The flag of Elba was used during the period of stay of Napoleon Bonaparte as sovereign of the island of Elba, from 4 May 1814 to 26 February 1815. The flag, donated by Napoleon on his arrival on the island, was hoisted on the highest point of Portoferraio on the day of the landing of the emperor on the island. The original flag is kept in the Napoleon residence, Palazzina dei Mulini in Portoferraio. The meaning of the insignia chosen by the Emperor has long been, and continues to be, a matter of debate among historians.

== The red band ==
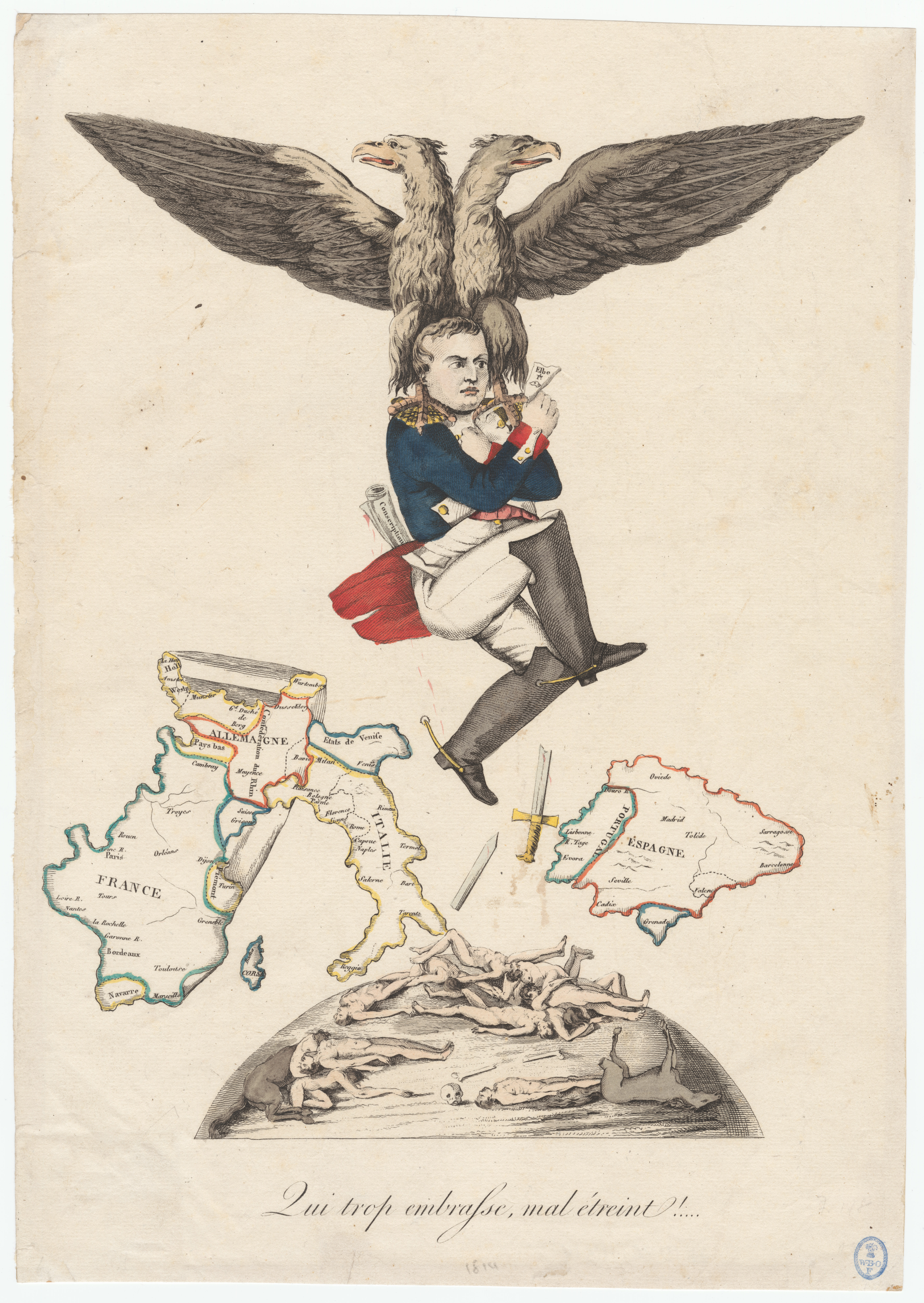
This is a caricature against Napoleon, who is borne off to Elba in April 1814 by a double-headed eagle representing the Sixth Coalition.

There are different theories about the origin of the red stripe on a white background. One of those is that the red and white colors were chosen from the Polish flag in honor of the Major Jan Paweł Jerzmanowski who followed Napoleon in his exile on Elba. Many authors agree however that Napoleon was inspired by a picture book on flags. The commander of the British frigate HMS Undaunted, Thomas Ussher, which led Napoleon to Elba from Marseille, tells that "Napoleon had with him a book in which were represented all the flags of Tuscany, ancient and modern, and he asked me my opinion on the one he had chosen." The British Commissioner designated to accompany Napoleon on Elba, Neil Campbell, confirms this version writing in his diary: "it was as exactly as possible an ancient flag of Tuscany."

=== The Grand Duchy of Tuscany flag ===
According to some authors, the red stripe on the white field was inspired by the colors of the flag of the Grand Duchy of Tuscany which ruled the island with the House of Medici first and the House of Habsburg-Lorraine after. Robert Christophe mentions that "The Emperor himself designed the flag." During the five days of the journey, he studied some books about Elba which he brought from Fontainebleau. Inspired by the Medici coat of arms, the ancient rulers of the island, he designed a new flag with a white background and a diagonal strip with three golden bees on top. The symbol of Florence would have been appreciated by the people of Elba and the golden bees, memory of the imperial mantle, were intended as a tribute to the soldiers who, under the command of Cambronne, after crossing France, were going to reach Portoferraio 20 days after." The flag of the Grand Duchy of Tuscany under the House of Medici had, however, nothing to do with the flag of Elba with the exception of the white background while the flag of the House of Habsburg-Lorraine, being red-white-red horizontal stripes, resembles the Elba flag due to the colors.

=== The Lordship of Piombino flag ===
Yet according to other authors, the diagonal band was inspired by a flag of House of Appiano that, first with the Lordship of Piombino, then with Principality of Piombino, ruled the city of Piombino and, as a direct dependent, the island of Elba. This flag is white, divided diagonally by a diagonal checkered band in red and white, starting from the top of the mast. As Vincenzo Mellini Ponçe de Léon wrote, it "reminded the inhabitants of Elba of their first lords, the House of Appiano, which ruled Elba after the collapse of the Republic of Pisa".

=== Conclusion ===
Napoleon, most likely, trying to create something new, yet at the same time familiar to the people of Elba, was inspired by the predominant white color present in the House of Medici and the House of Appiano flags, by the red of the House of Habsburg-Lorraine and the House of Appiano flags, and by the diagonal stripe, without diamonds, of the House of Appiano flag.

Flag of the Lordship of Piombino, House of Appiano

Flag of the Grand Duchy of Tuscany, House of Medici, 1562-1737

Flag of the Grand Duchy of Tuscany, House of Habsburg-Lorraine, 1765-1800 and 1814-1859

== The golden bees ==
Napoleon's coat of arms with golden bees on the mantel

Among the various hypotheses about the meaning of bees, one is that Napoleon wanted to symbolize the unity and hard work of Elba inhabitants. Another one, however, aroused greater foundation, attributes to Napoleon himself the explanation thereof. Speaking with Admiral Thomas Ussher, he said that he chosen the "three bees because they represent the people of Elba that has had three rulers and now, with me, they are finally united under a single banner." The golden bees are, however, very often a symbol in the Napoleon iconography.

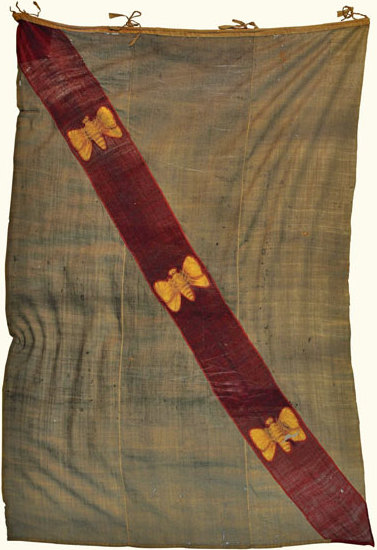
A photograph of a flag made during Napoleon's reign on the island

=== The bee in the Napoleonic vexillology ===
The bee was chosen by Napoleon to link the new dynasty to the ancient kingdom of France. Golden bees, being found in 1653 in Tournai in the tomb of Childeric I, father of Clovis I and founder of the Merovingian dynasty in 457, were considered the first emblem of the kings of France. They represented a sign of immortality and resurrection.

== The Polish Cavalry (Chevau-léger) ==
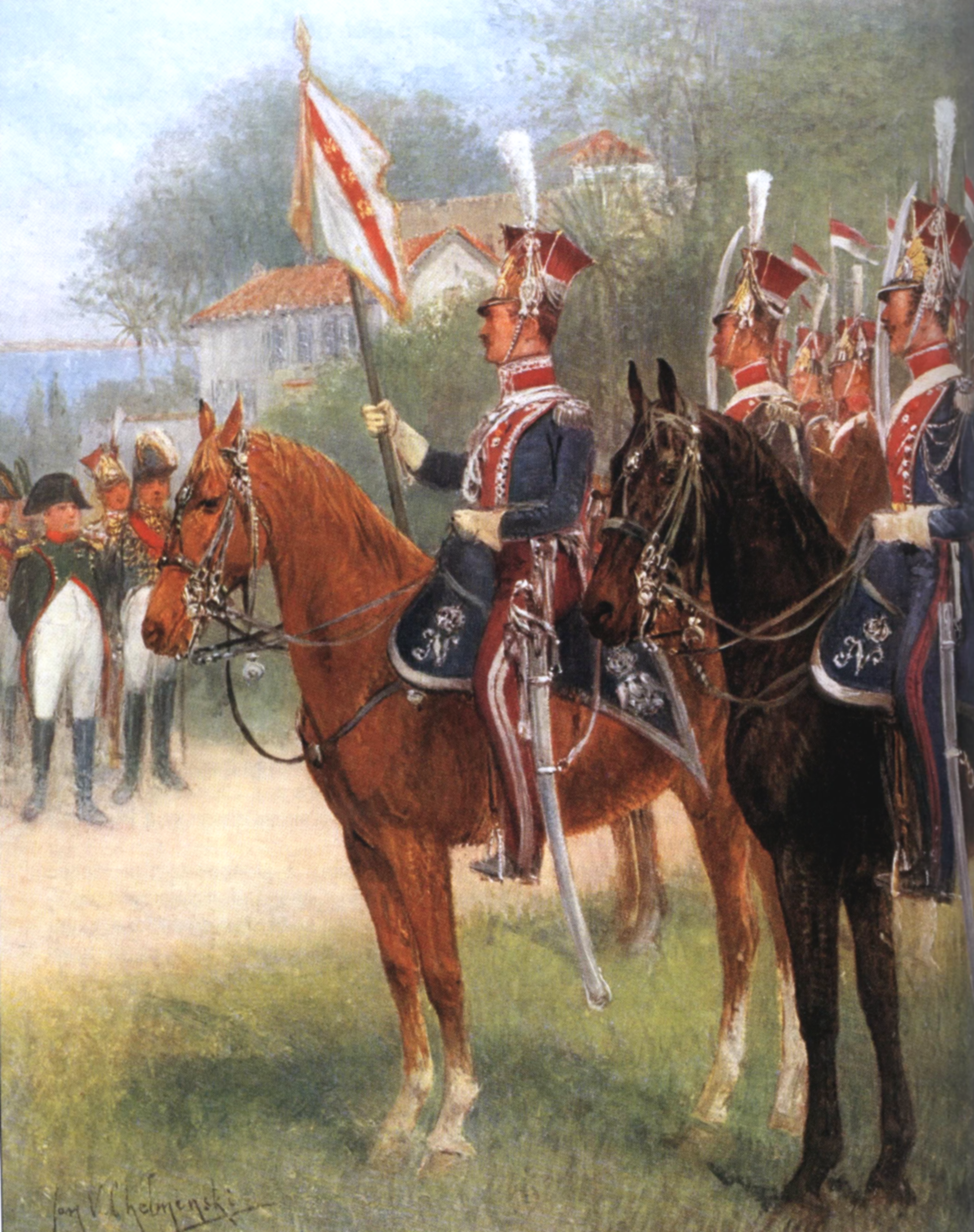
The Polish Cavalry Squadron Guard of Napoleon on Elba Island - Painting by Jan Chelminski

It is often believed that the flag of Elba has been borrowed from the Polish Cavalry (Chevau-léger), while the opposite is true. All Polish soldiers, who arrived on Elba with Napoleon (Grenadiers, Artillerymen, Cavalrymen of Chevau-léger and Lancers), were assembled under the command of Major Jan Paweł Jerzmanowski, into a single Cavalry Squadron. The squadron assumed the name of Polish Cavalry (Chevau-légers) - Napoleon Squadron - Guard of Napoleon on Elba Island and was given the flag of Elba. They were later assigned to the Grande Armée during the Hundred Days. There is no trace of the existence of the Squadron before 1814, just as there is no record of the use of the Elba flag by other units of the Polish Cavalry.

The flag of the Polish cavalry is kept at Musée de l'Armée of Paris and below the flag is the following statement:

“Etendard de l’Escadron de Chevau - Légers Polonais”.
Escadron Napoléon - De la Garde de Napoléon a l’Ile d’Elbe
(Don du Prince de la Moskowa le 12 juin 1929).

== Current use ==
Nowadays, the flag of Elba Island can be found in the armorial bearings of the municipalities of Elba towns of Campo nell'Elba, Marciana Marina and Rio and in the armorial bearing of Province of Livorno which consists, in turn, of the coat of arms of the city of Livorno surmounted by a flag of Elba.

== See also ==
- Principality of Elba
