= Capo Focardo Lighthouse =

Lighthouse on the island of Elba, Italy

Capo Focardo
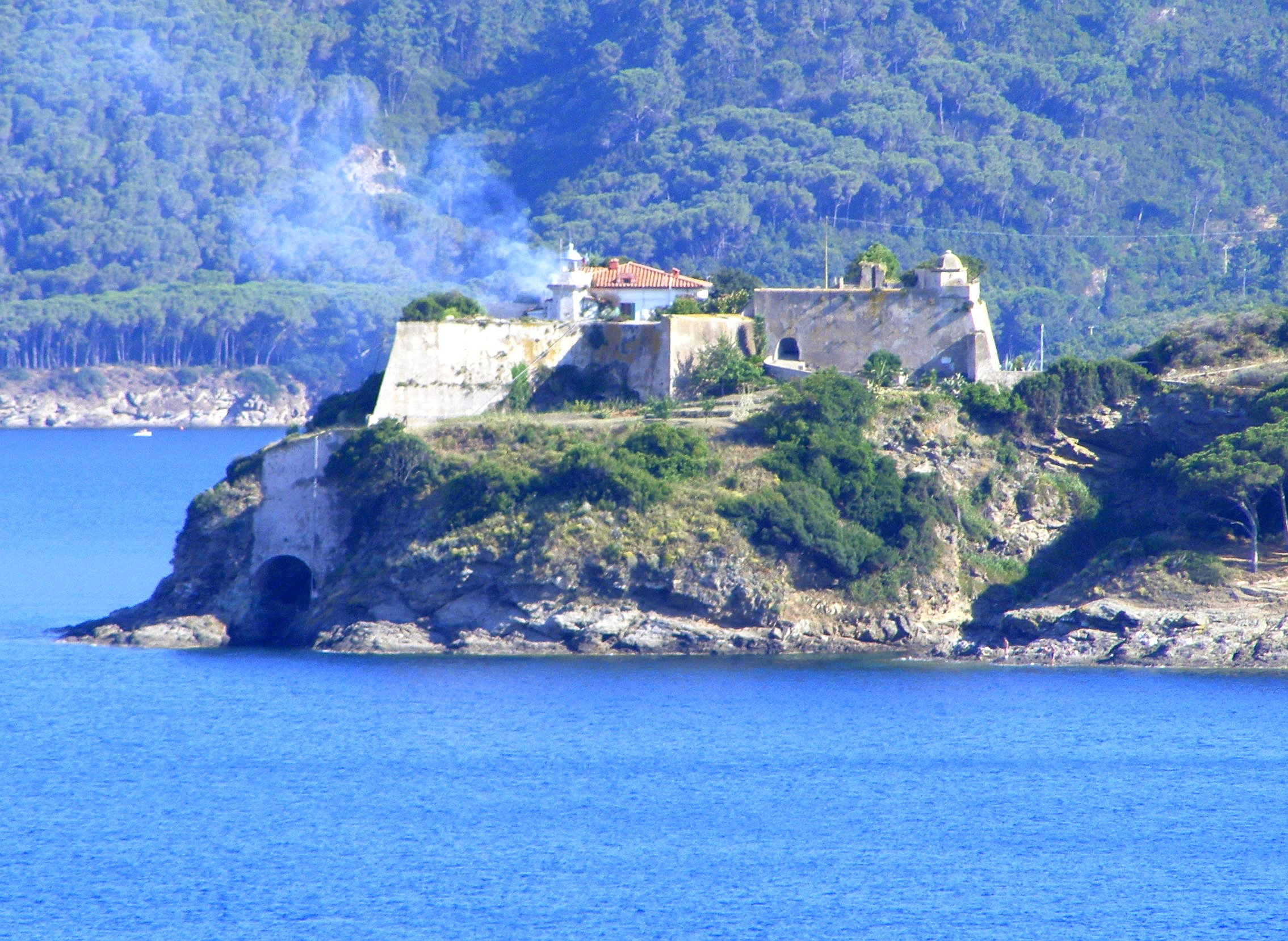
- Capo Focardo Lighthouse
- Location: Porto Azzurro; Elba; Italy
- Coordinates: 42°45′16″N 10°24′35″E

Tower
- Constructed: 1863
- Foundation: masonry base
- Construction: masonry tower
- Height: 13 metres (43 ft)
- Shape: octagonal tower with balcony and lantern
- Markings: white tower, grey metallic lantern dome
- Power source: mains electricity
- Operator: Marina Militare

Light
- Focal height: 32 metres (105 ft)
- Lens: Type OF
- Intensity: main: AL 1000 W reserve: LABI 100 W
- Range: main: 16 nautical miles (30 km; 18 mi) reserve: 11 nautical miles (20 km; 13 mi)
- Characteristic: Fl (3) W 15s.
- Italy no.: 2040 E.F.

Capo Focardo Lighthouse (Italian: Faro di Capo Focardo) is an active lighthouse located at the south eastern tip of the gulf of Porto Azzurro on the island of Elba in the Tuscan Archipelago.

== Description ==
The lighthouse, built in 1863, consists of an octagonal tower, 13 metres (43 ft) high, with balcony and lantern placed atop of an old fort. The tower and the lantern are white and the lantern dome is grey metallic. The light is positioned at 32 metres (105 ft) above sea level and emits three white flashes in a 15 seconds period visible up to a distance of 16 nautical miles (30 km; 18 mi). The lighthouse is completely automated and managed by the Marina Militare with the identification code number 2040 E.F.

== See also ==
- List of lighthouses in Italy
