= Jan Paweł Jerzmanowski =

Polish general officer (1779–1862)

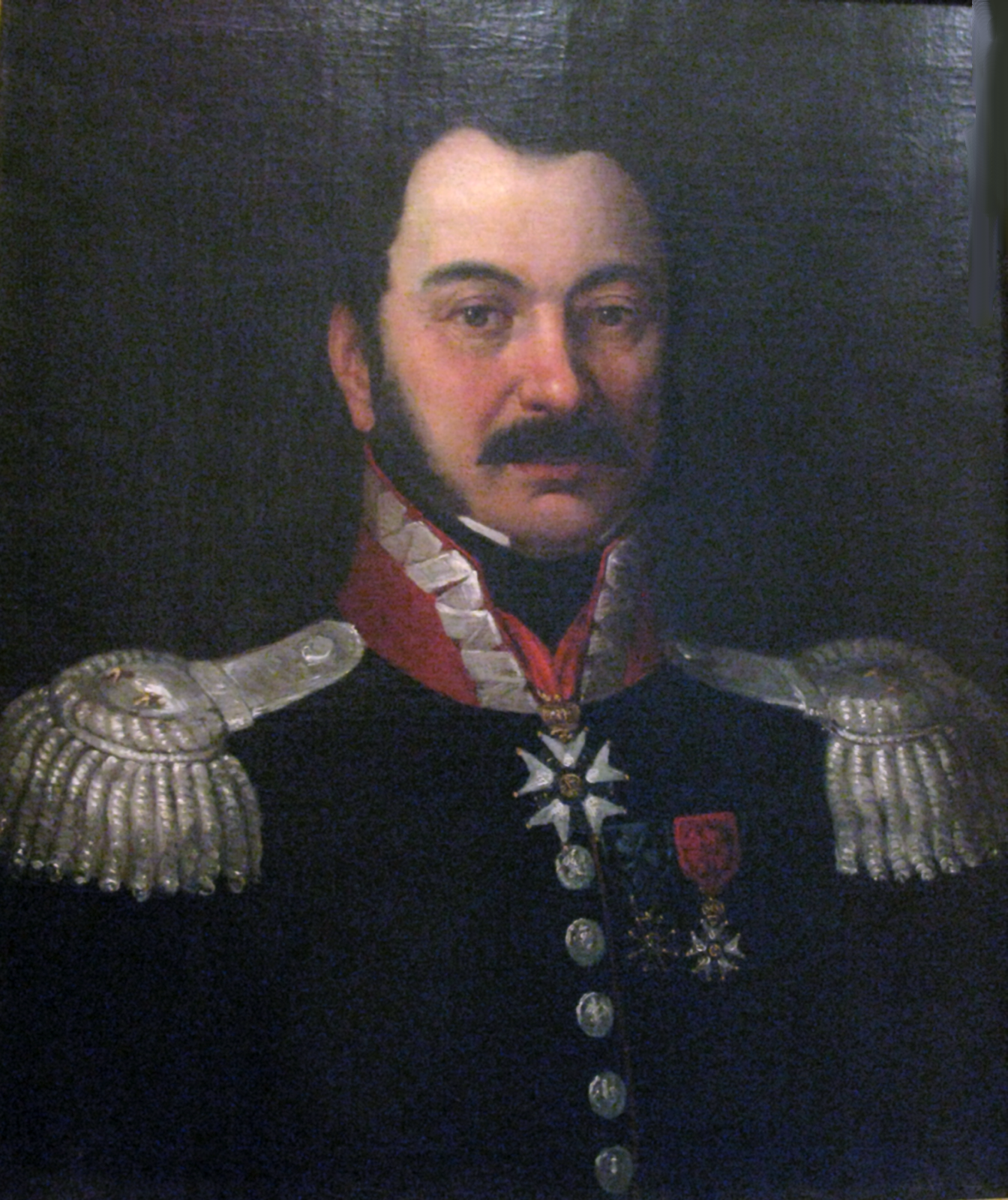
Paweł Jerzmanowski, in the uniform of a Polish army general, wearing his French decorations as well as the cross of the Order of Virtuti Militari . Anonymous, 19th century oil painting

Jan Paweł Jerzmanowski (June 25, 1779 - April 15, 1862) was a Polish general officer who participated in the Napoleonic Wars.

== Biography ==
Born on June 25, 1779 in Mniewo, Poland, to a family of minor nobility in the vicinity of Kielce, he is the son of François Jerzmanowski and Françoise Dobrska.

=== Officer of the Polish Light Cavalry of the Guard ===
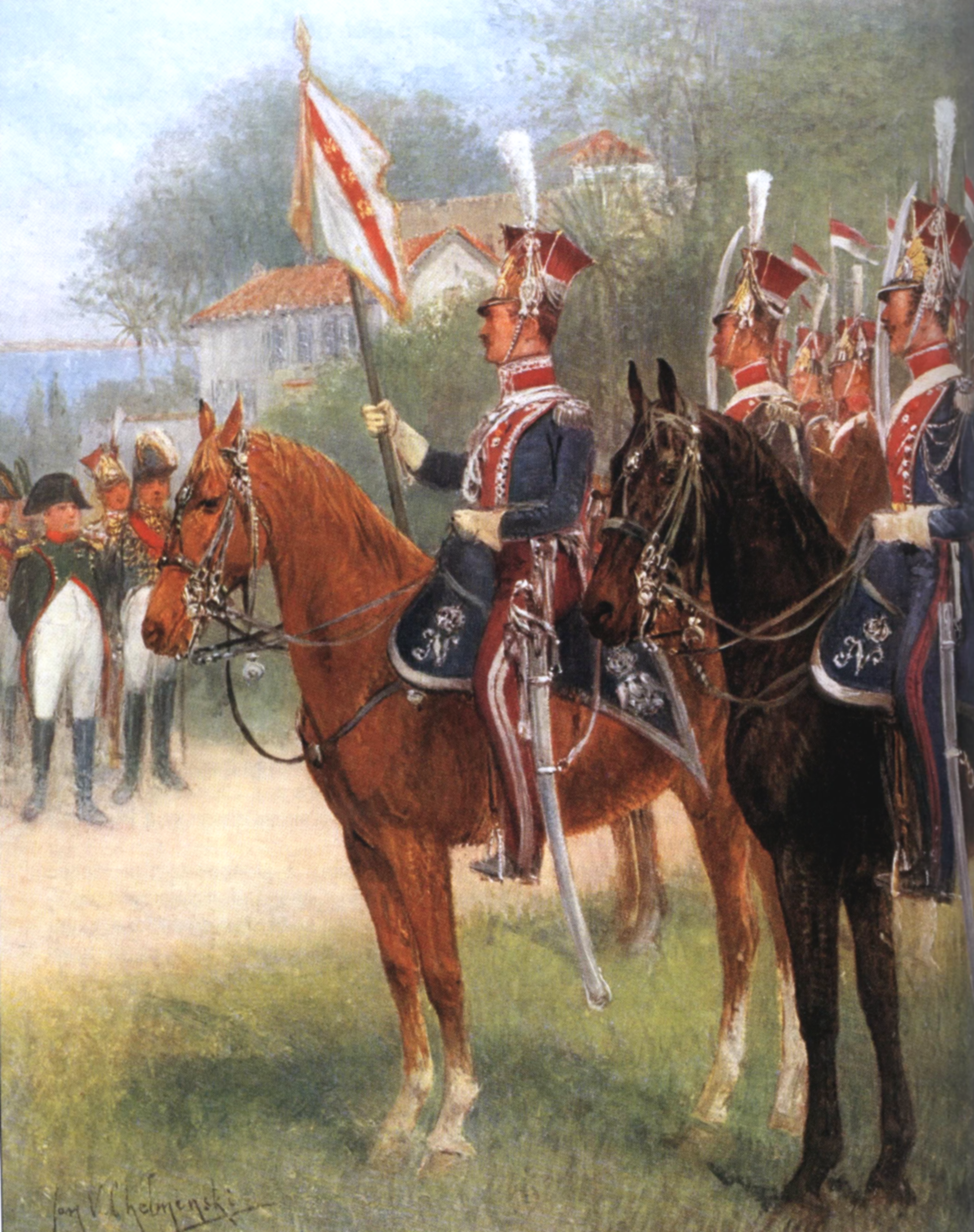
The Polish squadron on the island of Elba. Jerzmanowski is on the left, behind Napoleon.

Jerzmanowski was appointed captain of the Polish light cavalry of the Guard on April 7, 1807 and served in this corps until the end of the French Empire. In 1809, he distinguished himself at the Battle of Wagram where he received his first wound.

Promoted to squadron leader on February 17, 1811, he was tasked with bringing back from Spain the two squadrons of the regiment that are still fighting there, in preparation for the Russian campaign. He stayed at Bonaparte's side during the period of the principality of Elba and fought alongside the emperor until the end of the Battle of Waterloo.

=== Brigadier General ===
Until 1819 he served in the army of the Kingdom of Poland (Congress Kingdom), after which, he returned to France with his French wife Marie Anne Joseph de Coëtquen-Désormaux. In 1831, during the November Uprising, he served in the Polish National Committee in Paris, before being promoted to general the same year.

Jerzmanowski died on April 15, 1862 in Paris, France at age 82. He was buried two days later in the Montmartre Cemetery in Paris, in proximity to the Polish poet Juliusz Słowacki.

== Titles and decorations ==
In 1810 he received the gold cross of the Order of Virtuti Militari and the title of Knight of the Empire . In 1813, he was named Baron of the Empire and in 1815 he became Commander of the Legion of Honor.
