= Capoliveri =

- Comune
- Comune di Capoliveri
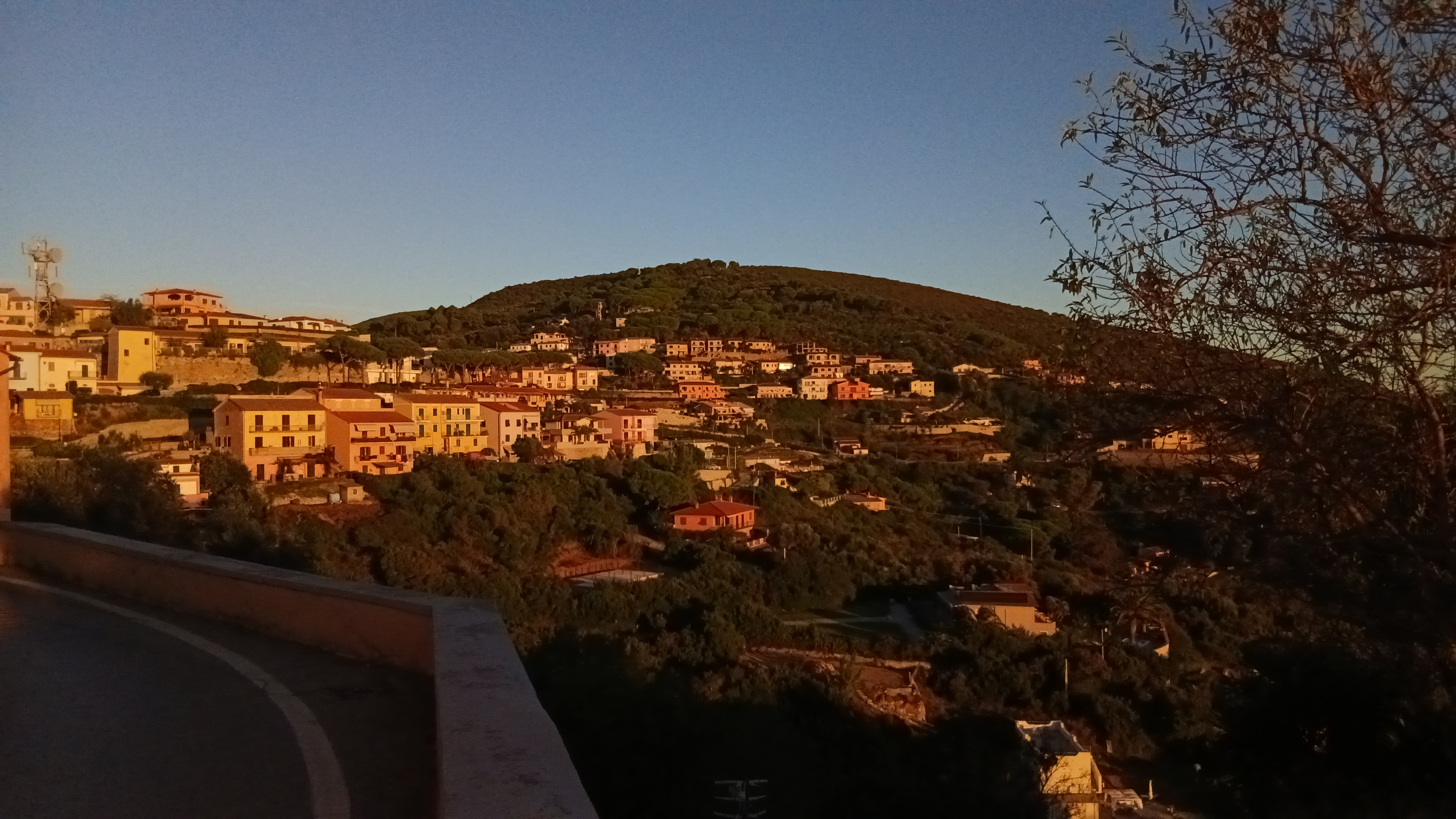
- View of Capoliveri

- Flag Coat of arms

- Location of Capoliveri in Tuscany Capoliveri (Italy)
- Coordinates: 42°45′N 10°23′E
- Country: Italy
- Region: Tuscany
- Province: Province of Livorno (LI)
- Frazioni: Innamorata, Lacona, Lido, Madonna delle Grazie, Mola, Morcone, Naregno, Pareti

Government
  - Mayor: Ruggero Barbetti

Area
  - Total: 39.56 km^{2} (15.27 sq mi)
- Elevation: 167 m (548 ft)

Population (2026)
  - Total: 3,970
  - Density: 100/km^{2} (260/sq mi)
- Demonym: Capoliveresi
- Time zone: UTC+1 (CET)
  - Summer (DST): UTC+2 (CEST)
- Postal code: 57031
- Dialing code: 0565
- Patron saint: St. Roch
- Saint day: August 16
- Website: Official website

Capoliveri is a comune (municipality) on the island of Elba, in the Province of Livorno in the region of Tuscany in Italy. It is located about 130 kilometres (81 mi) southwest of Florence and about 90 kilometres (56 mi) south of Livorno. It has 3,970 inhabitants.

The name appeared for the first time in a document of the republic of Genoa.

Capoliveri borders the municipalities of Campo nell'Elba, Porto Azzurro, and Portoferraio.

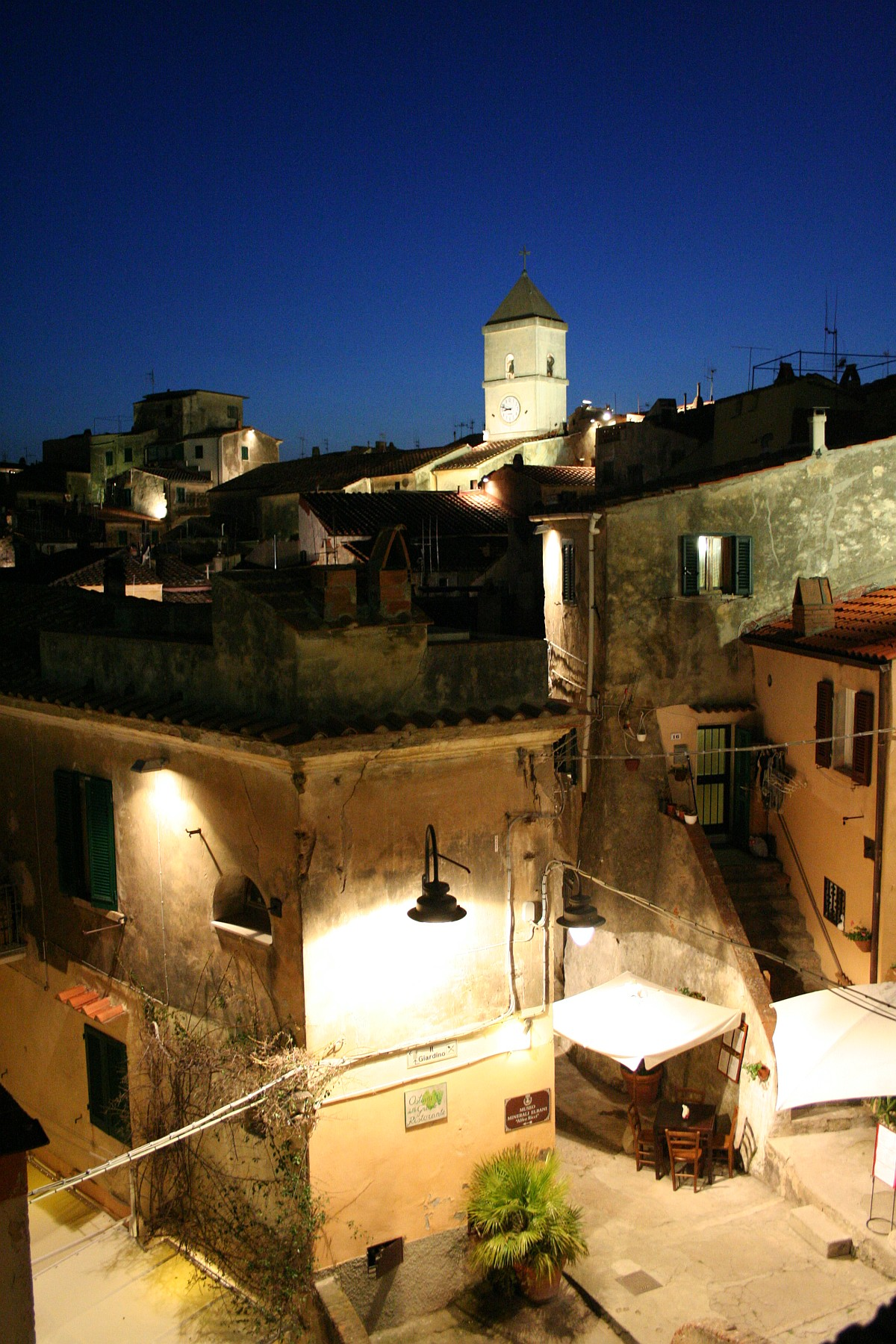

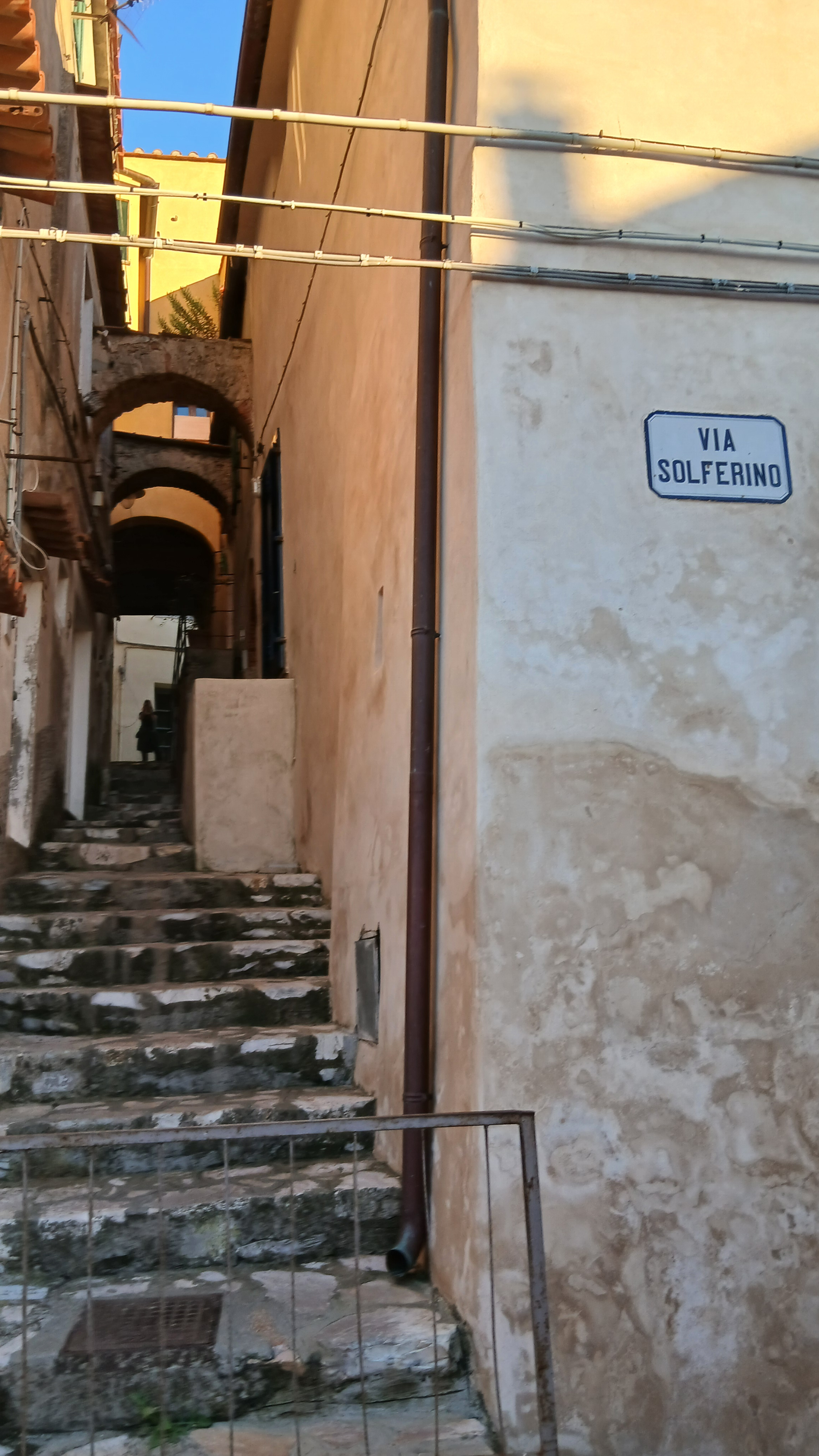

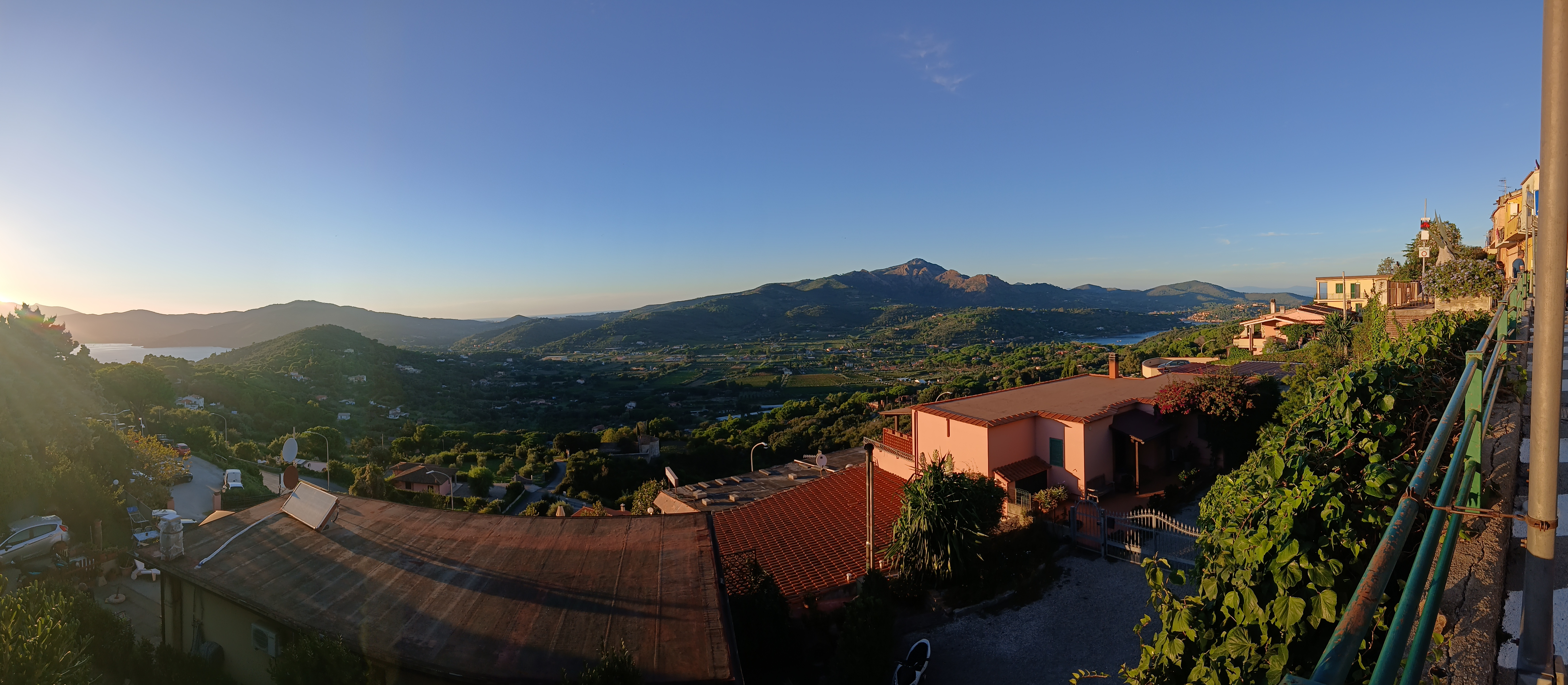

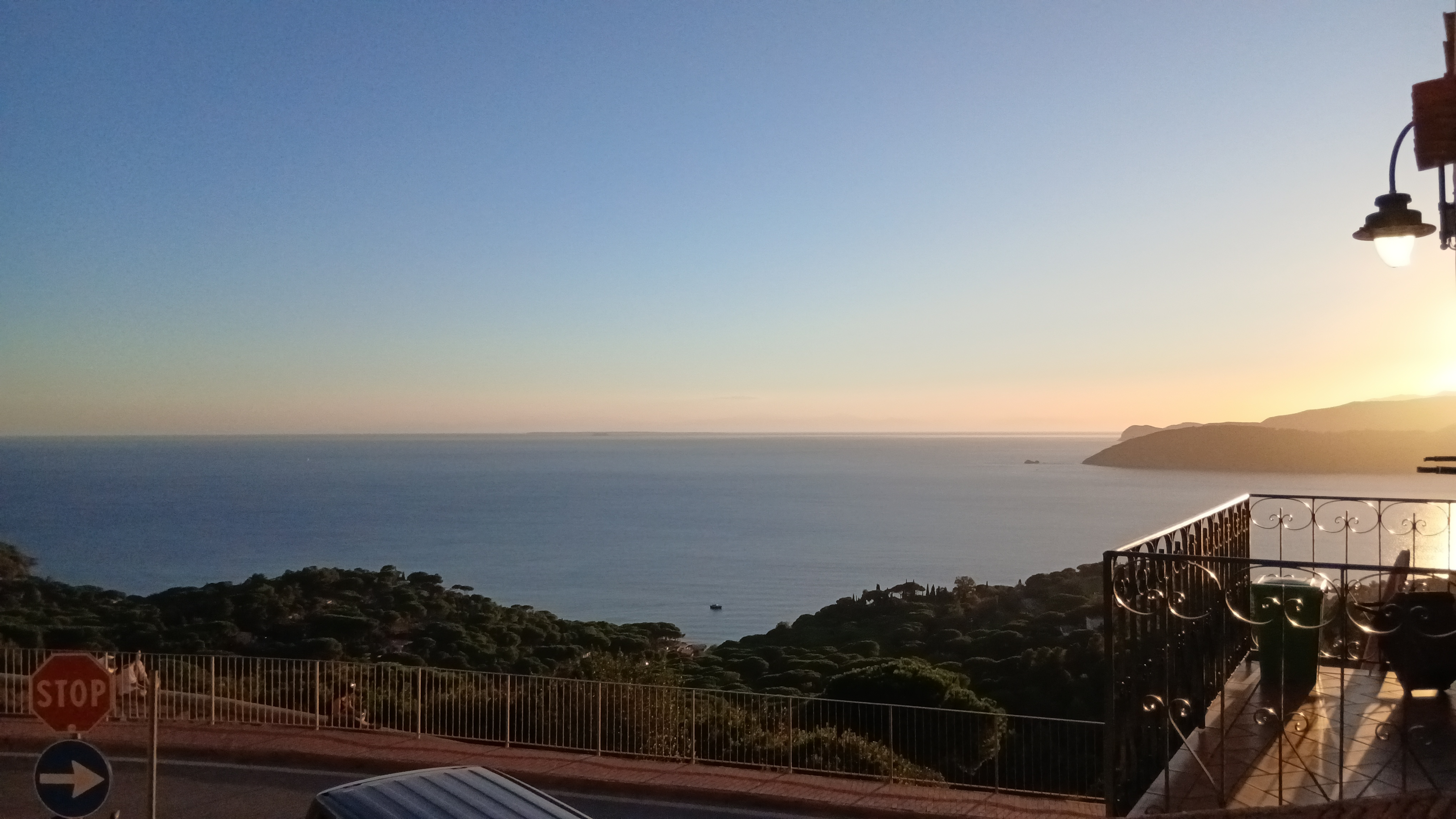

== Demographics ==
As of 2026, the population is 3,970, of which 49.7% are male, and 50.3% are female. Minors make up 12.9% of the population, and seniors make up 26.3%.

Historical population

Year	Pop.	±%
1861	1,518	—
1871	1,533	+1.0%
1881	1,747	+14.0%
1901	2,235	+27.9%
1911	2,773	+24.1%
1921	2,635	−5.0%
1931	2,424	−8.0%
1936	2,431	+0.3%

Year	Pop.	±%
1951	2,233	−8.1%
1961	2,168	−2.9%
1971	2,193	+1.2%
1981	2,239	+2.1%
1991	2,435	+8.8%
2001	3,105	+27.5%
2011	3,763	+21.2%
2021	3,878	+3.1%

Source: ISTAT

=== Immigration ===
As of 2025, immigrants make up 19.7% of the population. The 5 largest foreign countries of birth are Romania, Germany, Albania, Moldova, and Morocco.
