= Porto Azzurro =

- Comune
- Comune di Porto Azzurro
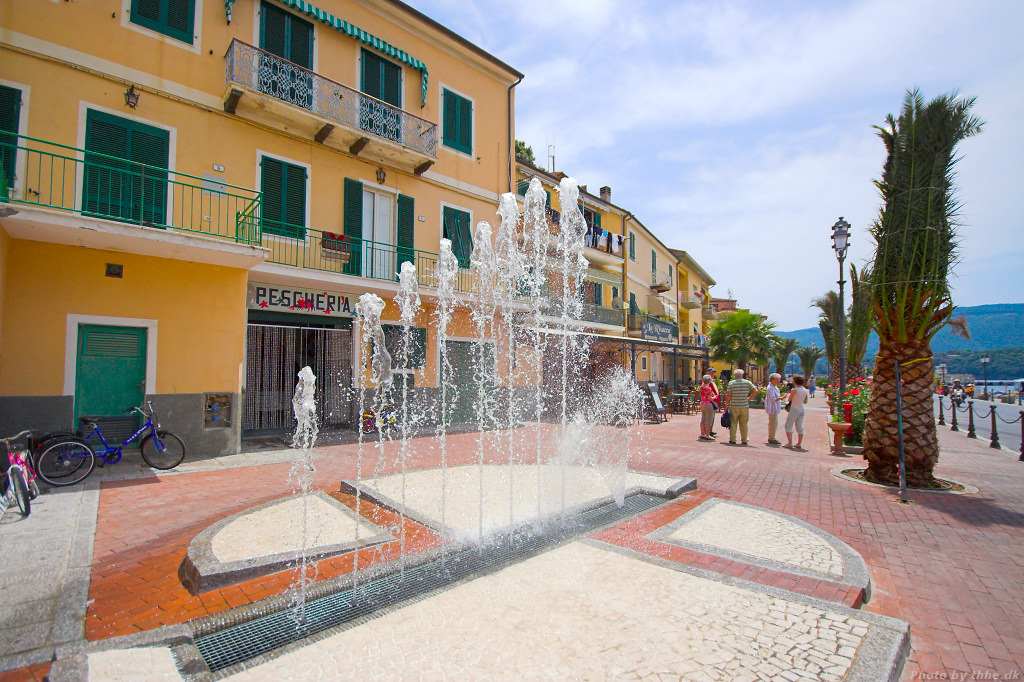
- Fountain in Porto Azzurro in May 2007

- Coat of arms

- Location within Italy Location within Tuscany
- Coordinates: 42°46′N 10°24′E
- Country: Italy
- Region: Tuscany
- Province: Livorno (LI)
- Frazioni: Barbarossa, Mola

Government
  - Mayor: Luca Simoni

Area
  - Total: 13.33 km^{2} (5.15 sq mi)
- Elevation: 2 m (6.6 ft)

Population (2026)
  - Total: 3,687
  - Density: 276.6/km^{2} (716.4/sq mi)
- Demonym(s): Longonesi, Portoazzurrini
- Time zone: UTC+1 (CET)
  - Summer (DST): UTC+2 (CEST)
- Postal code: 57036
- Dialing code: 0565
- Patron saint: St. James
- Saint day: 26 July

Porto Azzurro is a town and comune (municipality) on the island of Elba, in the Province of Livorno in the Italian region Tuscany. It is located about 130 kilometres (81 miles) southwest of Florence and about 90 kilometres (56 mi) south of Livorno. It has 3,687 inhabitants.

Porto Azzurro borders the municipalities of Capoliveri, Portoferraio, and Rio.

== History ==
It was formerly called Porto Longone, and in 1557 Iacopo VI Appiani, Prince of Piombino, granted Spain the right to build a fortress there, so it was transferred to the State of the Presidi that it was born as a direct possession of the crown of Spain. The state had only governors sent by the central Spanish government first and then Austrian. In 1801, Napoleon established the Kingdom of Etruria. Eventually it was transferred to the Grand Duchy of Tuscany.

== Demographics ==
As of 2026, the population is 3,687, of which 51.7% are male, and 48.3% are female. Minors make up 12.4% of the population, and seniors make up 23.5%.

Historical population

Year	Pop.	±%
1861	2,421	—
1871	2,444	+1.0%
1881	2,786	+14.0%
1901	2,352	−15.6%
1911	2,544	+8.2%
1921	2,555	+0.4%
1931	2,369	−7.3%
1936	2,429	+2.5%

Year	Pop.	±%
1951	3,078	+26.7%
1961	3,006	−2.3%
1971	2,929	−2.6%
1981	3,073	+4.9%
1991	3,111	+1.2%
2001	3,220	+3.5%
2011	3,826	+18.8%
2021	3,640	−4.9%

Source: ISTAT

=== Immigration ===
As of 2025, immigrants make up 12.1% of the population. The 5 largest foreign countries of birth are Romania, Moldova, Ukraine, Germany, and Albania.

== See also ==
- Capo Focardo Lighthouse
