= Marciana Marina =

- Comune
- Comune di Marciana Marina
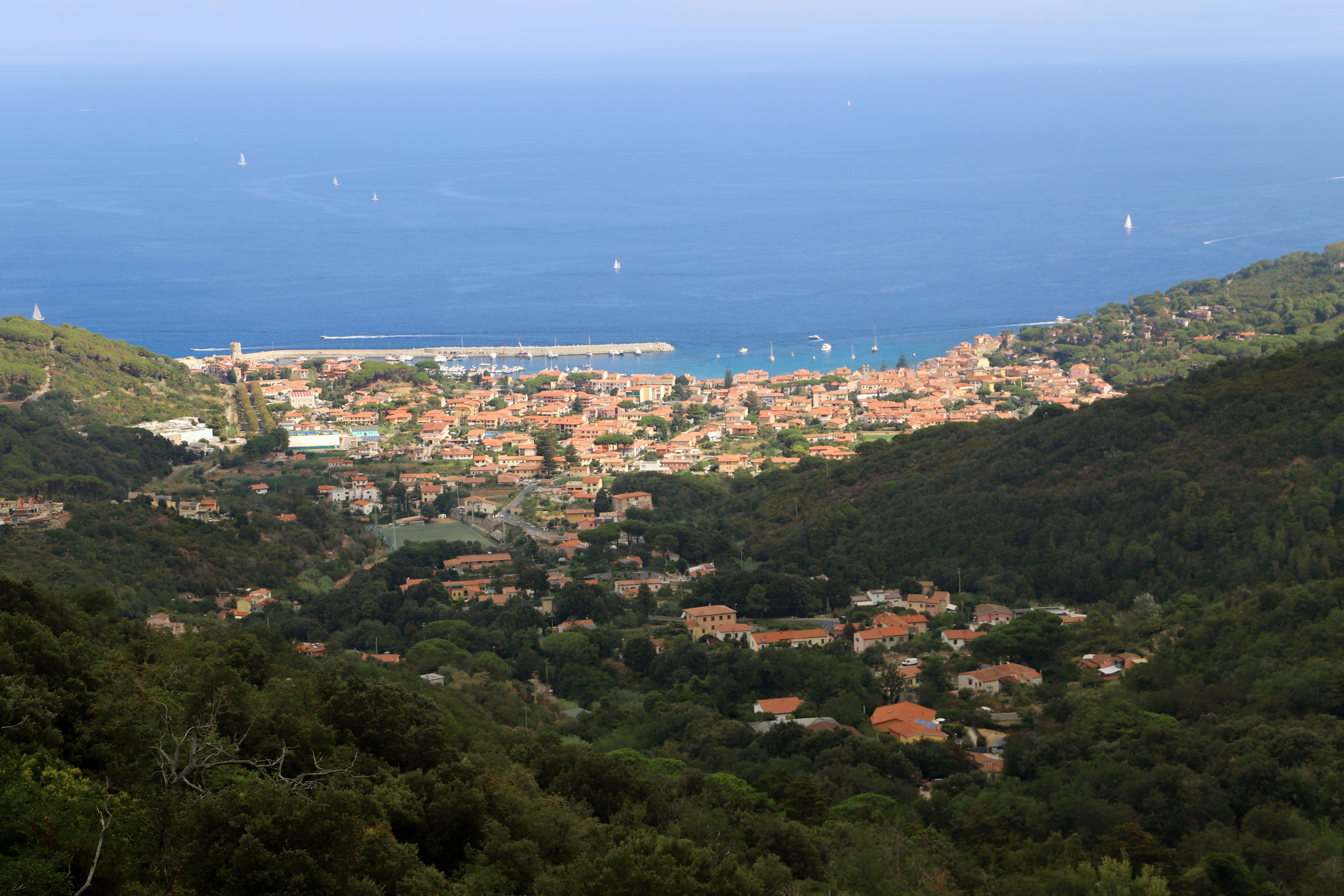
- View of Marciana Marina

- Location within Italy Location within Tuscany
- Coordinates: 42°48′N 10°12′E
- Country: Italy
- Region: Tuscany
- Province: Livorno (LI)

Government
  - Mayor: Gabriella Allori

Area
  - Total: 5.86 km^{2} (2.26 sq mi)
- Elevation: 3 m (9.8 ft)

Population (2026)
  - Total: 1,852
  - Density: 316/km^{2} (819/sq mi)
- Demonym: Marinesi
- Time zone: UTC+1 (CET)
  - Summer (DST): UTC+2 (CEST)
- Postal code: 57033
- Dialing code: 0565
- Patron saint: St. Claire
- Saint day: August 12
- Website: Official website

Marciana Marina is a town and comune (municipality) on the island of Elba, in the Province of Livorno in the region of Tuscany in Italy. It has 1,852 inhabitants.

There is a small marina (Circolo della Vela Marciana Marina), two small beaches and an old Torre Medicea, built to protect the city in the past from the frequent pirate invasion.

The promenade going from the old part of the city (called Il Cotone) to the Torre Medicea has preserved the original architectonical and urbanistic features of the 18th century.

Marciana Marina borders the municipality of Marciana.

== Demographics ==
As of 2026, the population is 1,852, of which 49.3% are male, and 50.7% are female. Minors make up 10.1% of the population, and seniors make up 31.6%.

Historical population

Year	Pop.	±%
1861	2,135	—
1871	2,346	+9.9%
1881	2,426	+3.4%
1901	1,827	−24.7%
1911	1,664	−8.9%
1921	1,731	+4.0%
1931	1,804	+4.2%
1936	1,698	−5.9%

Year	Pop.	±%
1951	1,751	+3.1%
1961	1,777	+1.5%
1971	1,830	+3.0%
1981	1,955	+6.8%
1991	1,971	+0.8%
2001	1,891	−4.1%
2011	1,946	+2.9%
2021	1,876	−3.6%

Source: ISTAT

=== Immigration ===
As of 2025, immigrants make up 12.3% of the population. The 5 largest foreign countries of birth are Romania, Moldova, United Kingdom, Brazil, and Tunisia.
