= Elba =

Mediterranean island in Tuscany, Italy

Native name: Isola d'Elba (Italian)
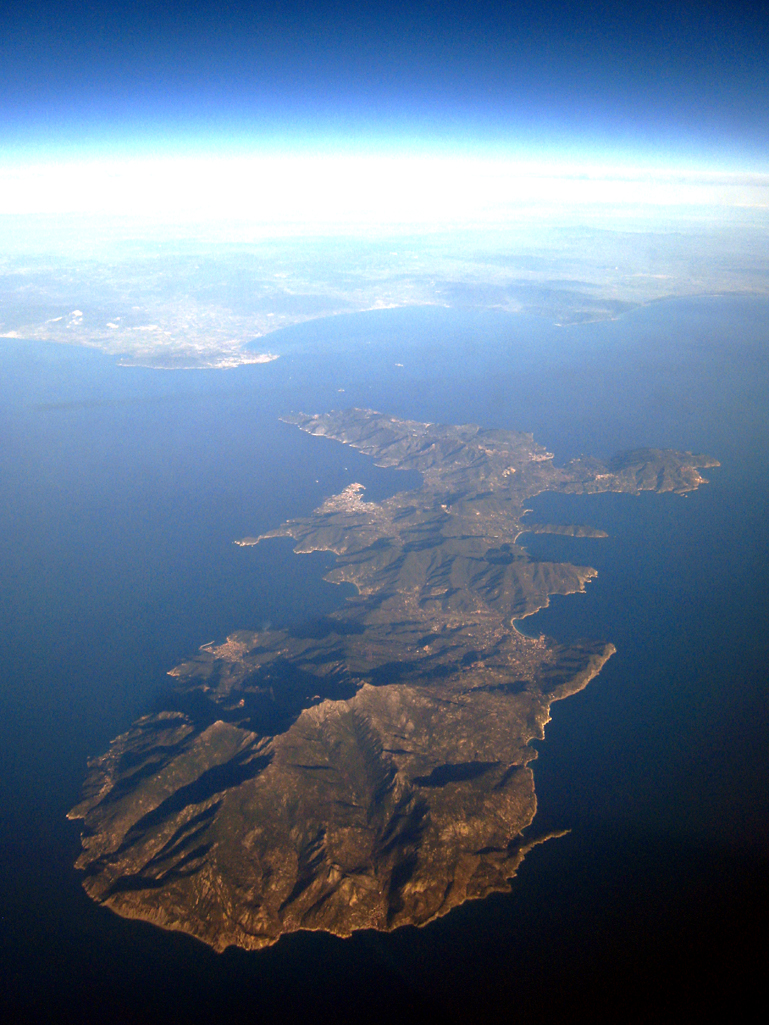
- Seen from the west, Monte Capanne in foreground

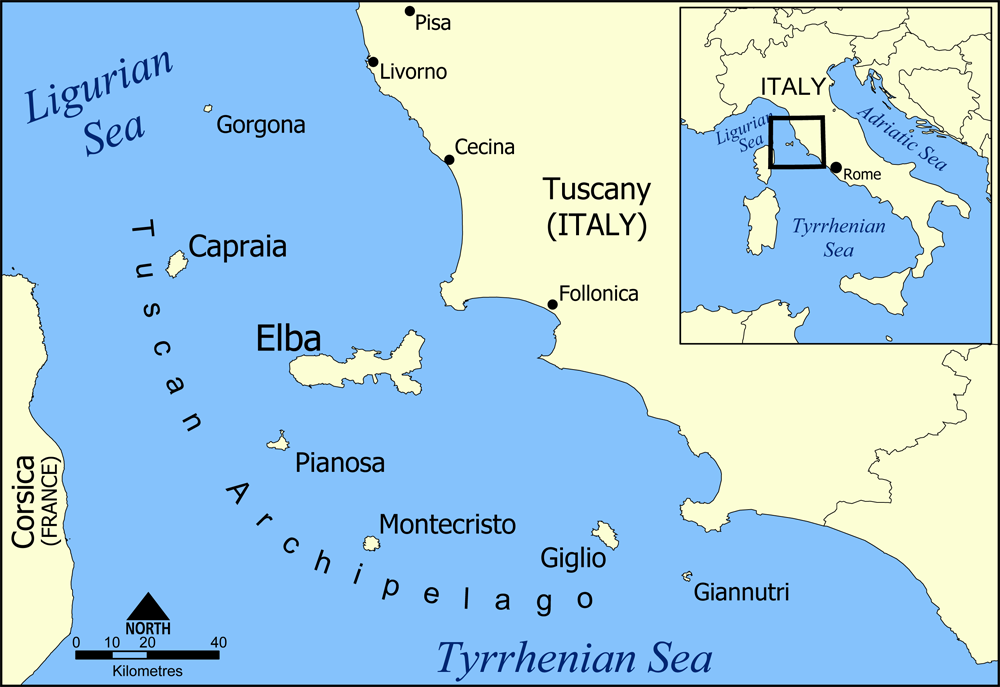

Geography
- Location: Tyrrhenian Sea
- Coordinates: 42°46′48″N 10°16′30″E
- Archipelago: Tuscan Archipelago
- Total islands: 7
- Major islands: Elba, Gorgona, Capraia, Pianosa, Montecristo, Isola del Giglio, and Giannutri
- Area: 244.99 km^{2} (94.59 sq mi)
- Length: 29 km (18 mi)
- Width: 18 km (11.2 mi)
- Coastline: 147 km (91.3 mi)
- Highest elevation: 1,018 m (3340 ft)
- Highest point: Monte Capanne

Administration
- Italy
- Region: Tuscany
- Province: Livorno
- Communes of Elba: Portoferraio, Campo nell'Elba, Capoliveri, Marciana, Marciana Marina, Porto Azzurro, Rio
- Largest settlement: Portoferraio (pop. 11,748)

Demographics
- Population: 31,362 (2026)
- Pop. density: 128.0/km^{2} (331.5/sq mi)

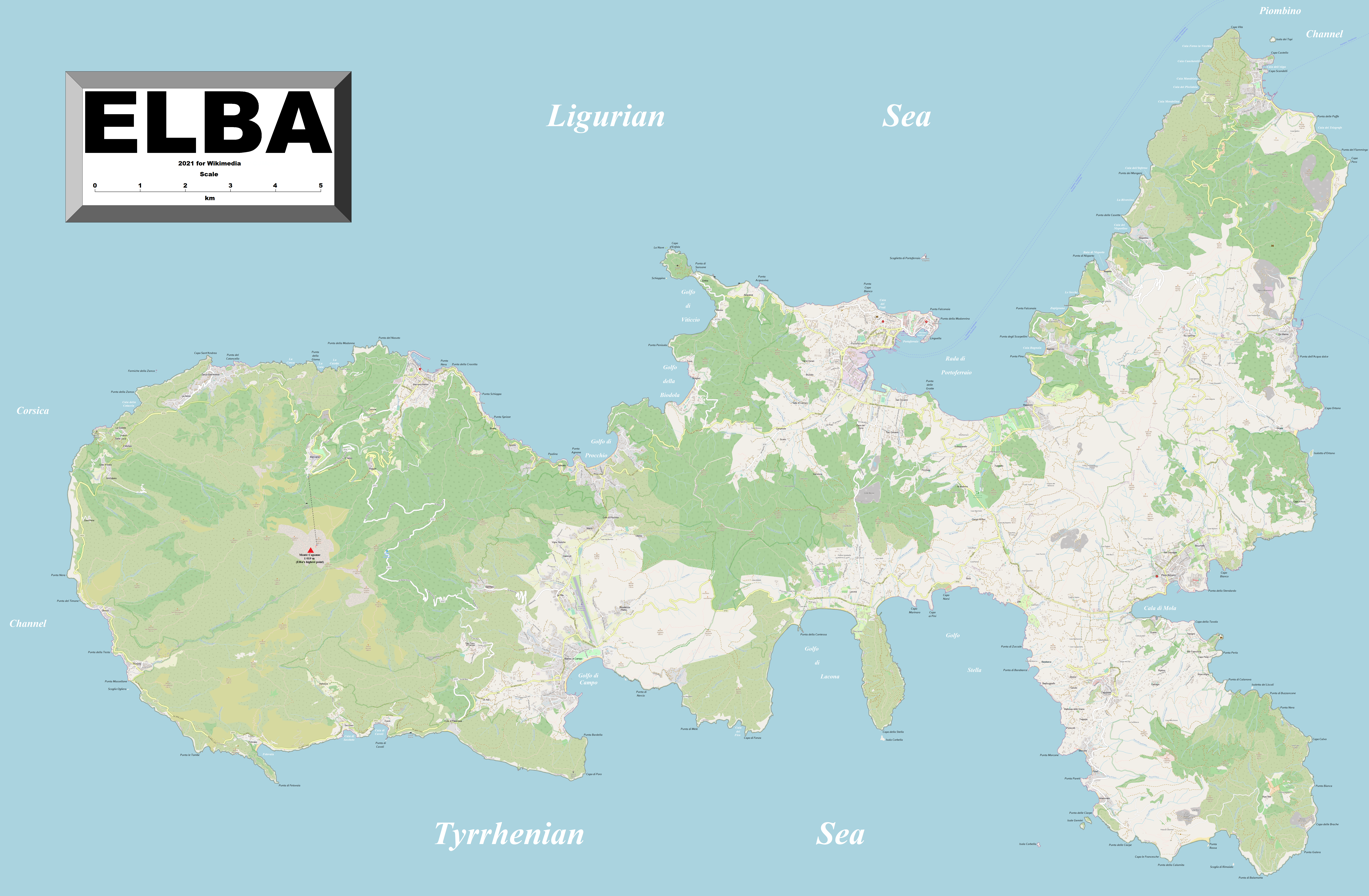
Enlargeable, detailed map of Elba

Elba (Italian: isola d'Elba, pronounced [ˈiːzola ˈdelba]; Latin: Ilva) is a Mediterranean island in the region of Tuscany in Italy, 10 km (6.2 mi) from the coastal town of Piombino on the Italian mainland, and the largest island of the Tuscan Archipelago. It is also part of the Arcipelago Toscano National Park, and the third largest island in Italy, after Sicily and Sardinia. It is located in the Tyrrhenian Sea about 50 km (30 mi) east of the French island of Corsica.

The island is part of the province of Livorno and is divided into seven municipalities, with a permanent population of 31,362, which increases considerably during the summer. The municipalities are Portoferraio (which is also the island's principal town), Campo nell'Elba, Capoliveri, Marciana, Marciana Marina, Porto Azzurro, and Rio.

It is famous for being the site of Napoleon's first exile, from 1814 to 1815.

== History ==
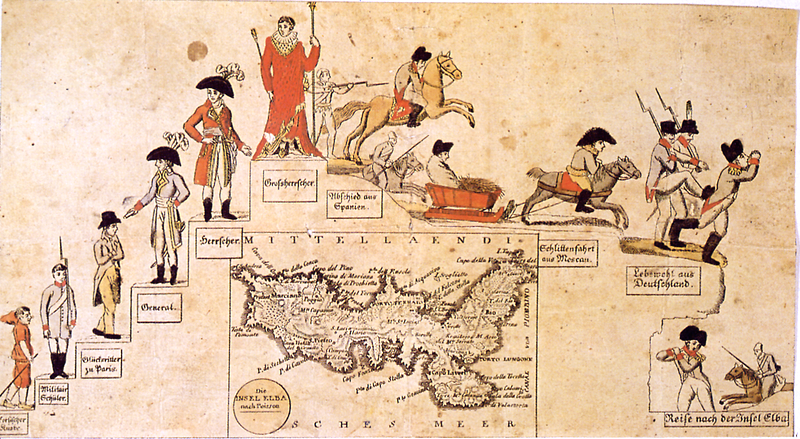
The map of Elba in The Rise and Fall of Napoleon, 1814 cartoon by Johann Michael Voltz

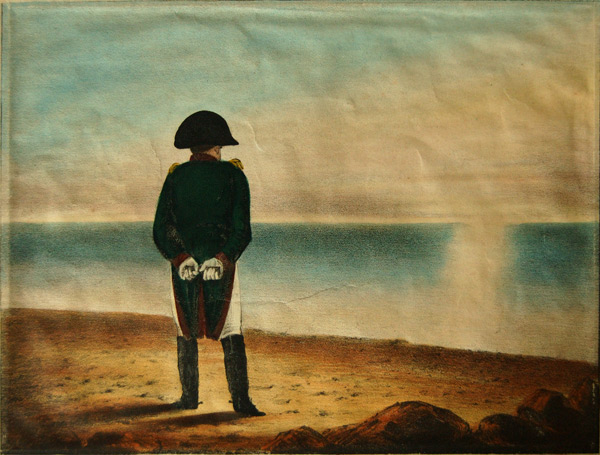
Napoleon on Elba

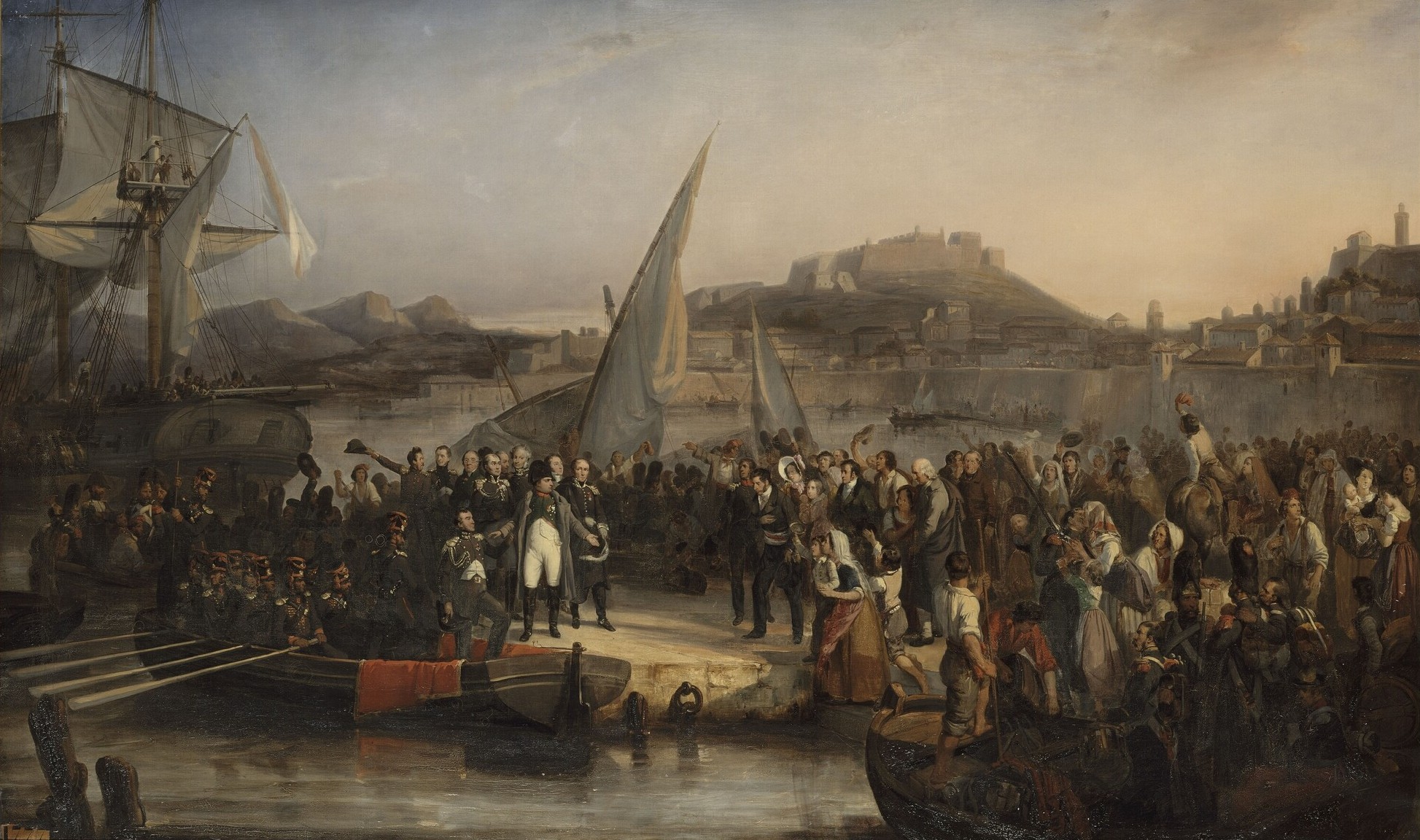
Napoleon's Departure from Elba by Joseph Beaume, 1836. Napoleon Bonaparte leaving Elba on 26 February 1815

=== Early history ===
The island was originally inhabited by Ligures Ilvates and was called Ilva (Ἰλούα). It was well known from very ancient times for its iron resources and valued mines. The Greeks also called it Aethalia (Αἰθαλία or Αἰθάλεια) and Aethale (Αἰθάλη) from "smoky" (αἰθάλη), after the fumes of the metal producing furnaces.

Apollonius of Rhodes mentions it in his epic poem Argonautica, describing that the Argonauts rested here during their travels. He writes that signs of their visit were still visible in his day, including skin-coloured pebbles that they dried their hands on and large stones which they used at discus. Strabo (5.2.6) presents a slightly different account: "because the scrapings, which the Argonauts formed when they used their strigils, became congealed, the pebbles on the shore remain variegated still to this day." The port which is now called Porto Ferraio, was known in ancient times as the portus Argous (Ἀργῶος λιμήν), because it was believed that the Argonauts landed there on their return voyage.

The island was then settled by the Etruscans, who started mining iron at Elba, and later (after 480 BC) by the Romans, who called the island Ilva.

=== Middle Ages and early modern ===
In the early medieval period, Elba was invaded by the Ostrogoths and the Lombards, and later it became a possession of the Republic of Pisa. After the battle of Meloria, the Republic of Genoa took possession of Elba, but it was regained by Pisa in 1292. The island was retained for two centuries by the Appiani family, Lords of Piombino, when they sold Pisa to the house of Visconti of Milan in 1399.

In 1544, the Barbary pirates from North Africa devastated Elba and the coasts of Tuscany. In 1546, part of the island was handed over to Cosimo I de' Medici, Grand Duke of Tuscany, who fortified Portoferraio and renamed it "Cosmopoli", while the rest of the island was returned to the Appiani in 1577. In 1596, Philip II of Spain captured Porto Longone and had two fortresses built there. This part of Elba came into the direct power of Spain through the State of the Presidi, including Porto Longone. In 1736, the sovereignty of this part of Elba was claimed by the Kingdom of Naples but remained abandoned.

=== Late modern and contemporary ===
The British landed on the island of Elba in 1796, after the occupation of Livorno by the French Republican troops, to protect the 4,000 French royalists who had found asylum in Portoferraio two years earlier. In 1801, the Peace of Luneville gave Elba to the Kingdom of Etruria, and it was transferred to France in 1802 by the Peace of Amiens.

The French Emperor Napoleon was exiled to Elba, after his forced abdication following the Treaty of Fontainebleau, and conveyed to the island on HMS Undaunted by Captain Thomas Ussher; he arrived at Portoferraio on 4 May 1814. He was allowed to keep a personal guard of 400 men and was nominally sovereign of Elba, a step down from Emperor of the French. The nearby seas were patrolled by the French and British navies to ensure he could not escape. During his nearly ten months on the island Napoleon energetically carried out a series of economic and social reforms. On 26 February 1815 he managed to escape back to France with about 1,000 men.

At the Congress of Vienna, Elba was given to the Grand Duchy of Tuscany. In 1860, it became part of the new unified Kingdom of Italy.

During the Second World War, the island was liberated from German occupation by the French 1^{er} Corps d'Armée supported by British forces including Royal Naval Commandos on 17 June 1944, in Opération Brassard. Faulty intelligence and strong defences made the battle more difficult than expected.

In 1954, BOAC Flight 781 crashed in the waters off the coast of Elba.

In recent decades, thanks to its rich cultural heritage, cuisine and nature, the island has become an important international tourist destination.

== Geography ==
Elba is the largest remaining stretch of land from the ancient tract that once connected the Italian peninsula to Corsica. The northern coast faces the Ligurian Sea, the eastern coast the Piombino Channel, the southern coast the Tyrrhenian Sea, and the Corsica Channel divides the western tip of the island from neighbouring Corsica.

=== Geology ===
The island itself is made up of slices of rocks which once formed part of the ancient Tethyan seafloor. These rocks have been through at least two orogenies, the Alpine orogeny and the Apennine orogeny. The second of these two events was associated with subduction of the Tethyan oceanic crust underneath Italy and the obduction of parts of the ancient seafloor onto the continents. Later extension within the stretched inner part of the Apennine Mountains caused adiabatic melting and the intrusion of the Mount Capanne and the La Serra-Porto Azzuro granitoids. These igneous bodies brought with them skarn fluids which dissolved and replaced some of the carbonate units, precipitating iron-rich minerals in their place. One of the iron-rich minerals, ilvaite, was first identified on the island and takes its name from the Latin word for Elba. More recently, high-angle faults formed within the tectonic pile, allowing for the migration of iron-rich fluids through the crust. The deposits left behind by these fluids formed the island's rich seams of iron ore.

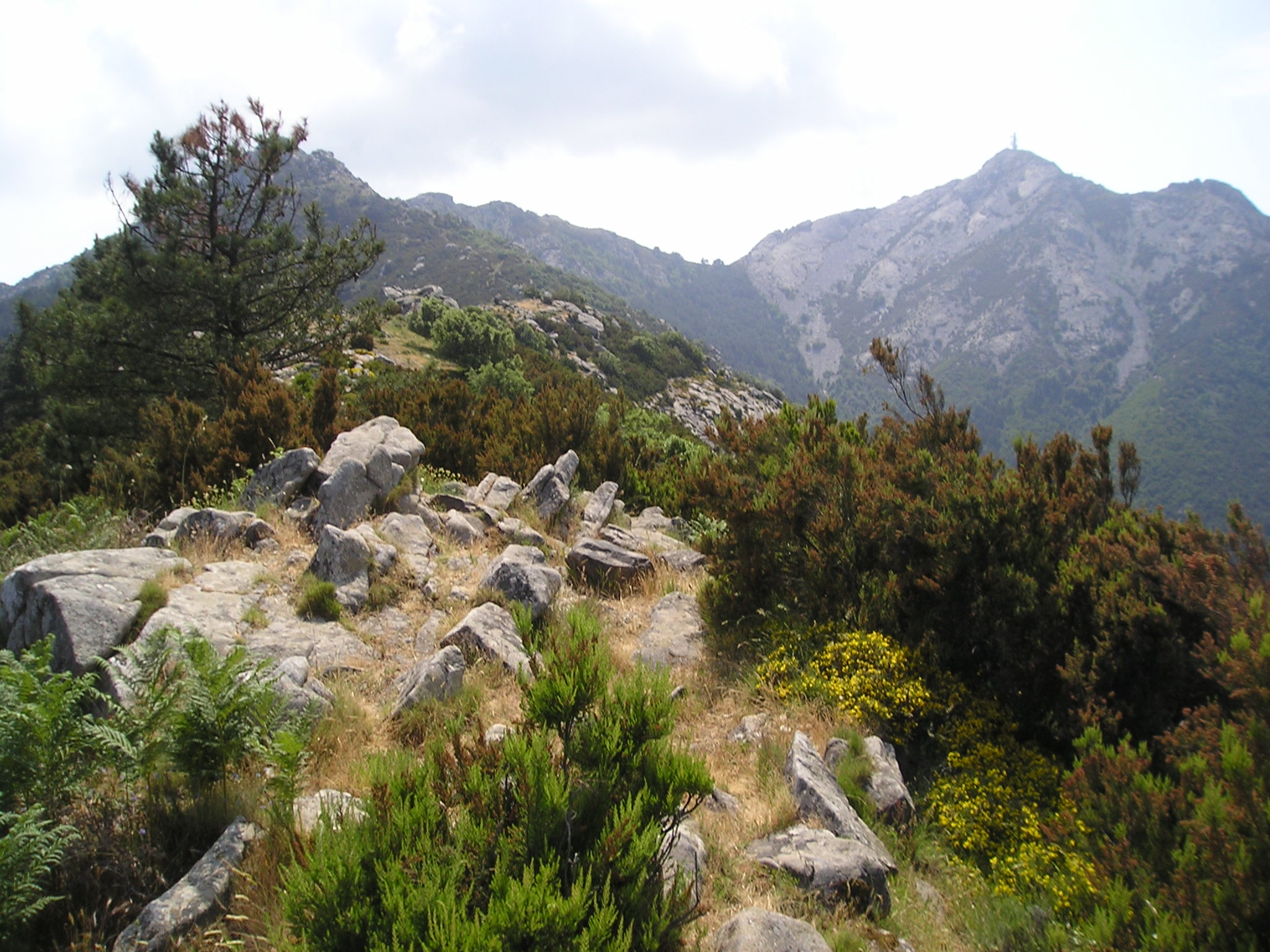
Mount Capanne

The terrain is quite varied and is thus divided into several areas based on geomorphology. The mountainous and most recent part of the island can be found to the west, the centre of which is dominated by Mount Capanne (at a height of 1,018 metres, or 3,340 feet), also called the "roof of the Tuscan Archipelago". The mountain is home to many animal species including the mouflon and wild boar, two species that flourish despite the continuous influx of tourists. The central part of the island is a mostly flat section with the width being reduced to just four kilometres (2.5 mi). It is where the major centres can be found: Portoferraio, Campo nell'Elba. To the east is the oldest part of the island, formed over 3 million years ago. In the hilly area, dominated by Monte Calamita, are the deposits of iron that made Elba famous.

=== Hydrography ===
Rivers rarely exceed 3 km (2 mi) in length, and it is common for the shorter ones to dry up during the summer. The largest rivers, sorted by length, are:

- Fosso San Francesco 6.5 km (4.0 mi);
- Fosso Barion, 5.1 km (3.2 mi);
- Fosso Redinoce, 2 km (1.2 mi)

Between Poggio and Marciana, at the foot of Mount Capanne, is a spring called Fonte Napoleone, known for its quality.

=== Climate ===
The climate of the island is predominantly Mediterranean, except for Mount Capanne, where winters tend to be moderately cold. Precipitation is concentrated in autumn and comprises a normal rainfall. The island lies in the rain shadow of the large and mountainous island of Corsica, so precipitation totals are somewhat reduced from the mainland (most of the island receives less than 750 mm (30 inches) annually). Snowfall in winter is rare in the lowlands and melts quickly. The table below shows the average temperatures for the islands by month.

Climate data for Monte Calamita, Elba Island (1991–2020)
Month	Jan	Feb	Mar	Apr	May	Jun	Jul	Aug	Sep	Oct	Nov	Dec	Year
Mean daily maximum °C (°F)	9.9 (49.8)	10.2 (50.4)	12.7 (54.9)	15.5 (59.9)	19.7 (67.5)	24.0 (75.2)	27.4 (81.3)	27.8 (82.0)	23.5 (74.3)	18.8 (65.8)	14.2 (57.6)	10.9 (51.6)	17.9 (64.2)
Daily mean °C (°F)	7.8 (46.0)	7.7 (45.9)	9.8 (49.6)	12.5 (54.5)	16.3 (61.3)	20.4 (68.7)	23.6 (74.5)	24.0 (75.2)	20.2 (68.4)	16.3 (61.3)	12.1 (53.8)	8.8 (47.8)	15.0 (58.9)
Mean daily minimum °C (°F)	5.7 (42.3)	5.3 (41.5)	7.1 (44.8)	9.6 (49.3)	13.2 (55.8)	16.9 (62.4)	19.9 (67.8)	20.4 (68.7)	17.0 (62.6)	13.9 (57.0)	10.0 (50.0)	6.9 (44.4)	12.2 (53.9)
Average precipitation mm (inches)	48.3 (1.90)	52.5 (2.07)	47.2 (1.86)	43.6 (1.72)	39.5 (1.56)	25.1 (0.99)	15.4 (0.61)	20.0 (0.79)	66.5 (2.62)	74.4 (2.93)	82.6 (3.25)	63.1 (2.48)	578.2 (22.78)
Average precipitation days (≥ 1.0 mm)	6.3	6.3	5.7	5.7	5.2	2.9	1.5	1.7	4.8	6.2	7.9	7.8	62
Average relative humidity (%)	77.5	74.0	72.8	72.7	72.8	71.0	68.8	70.3	74.1	78.5	80.0	78.2	74.2
Average dew point °C (°F)	4.1 (39.4)	3.1 (37.6)	4.9 (40.8)	7.5 (45.5)	11.2 (52.2)	14.8 (58.6)	16.9 (62.4)	17.7 (63.9)	15.1 (59.2)	12.3 (54.1)	8.8 (47.8)	5.2 (41.4)	10.1 (50.2)
Source: NOAA

Climate data for Elba
Month	Jan	Feb	Mar	Apr	May	Jun	Jul	Aug	Sep	Oct	Nov	Dec	Year
Record high °C (°F)	17.6 (63.7)	18.0 (64.4)	22.0 (71.6)	24.6 (76.3)	29.6 (85.3)	33.4 (92.1)	35.0 (95.0)	37.2 (99.0)	32.0 (89.6)	27.0 (80.6)	24.6 (76.3)	17.2 (63.0)	37.2 (99.0)
Mean daily maximum °C (°F)	9.6 (49.3)	10.0 (50.0)	12.0 (53.6)	14.2 (57.6)	18.8 (65.8)	22.7 (72.9)	26.5 (79.7)	26.7 (80.1)	22.6 (72.7)	18.0 (64.4)	13.4 (56.1)	10.5 (50.9)	17.1 (62.8)
Daily mean °C (°F)	7.4 (45.3)	7.5 (45.5)	9.2 (48.6)	11.4 (52.5)	15.6 (60.1)	19.3 (66.7)	22.7 (72.9)	23.1 (73.6)	19.5 (67.1)	15.4 (59.7)	11.2 (52.2)	8.5 (47.3)	14.2 (57.6)
Mean daily minimum °C (°F)	5.3 (41.5)	5.0 (41.0)	6.3 (43.3)	8.5 (47.3)	12.3 (54.1)	15.8 (60.4)	19.0 (66.2)	19.5 (67.1)	16.4 (61.5)	12.9 (55.2)	9.0 (48.2)	6.5 (43.7)	11.4 (52.5)
Record low °C (°F)	−7.4 (18.7)	−5.4 (22.3)	−5.4 (22.3)	1.2 (34.2)	3.4 (38.1)	5.0 (41.0)	12.2 (54.0)	11.6 (52.9)	7.6 (45.7)	2.0 (35.6)	−1.0 (30.2)	−5.4 (22.3)	−7.4 (18.7)
Average precipitation mm (inches)	59.5 (2.34)	75.6 (2.98)	56.2 (2.21)	57.8 (2.28)	31.6 (1.24)	26.8 (1.06)	13.8 (0.54)	41.5 (1.63)	75.0 (2.95)	101.6 (4.00)	88.7 (3.49)	50.5 (1.99)	678.6 (26.71)
Average precipitation days (≥ 1.0 mm)	6.7	6.2	6.9	7.0	5.0	3.5	1.6	2.4	5.0	7.9	7.3	5.8	65.3
Average relative humidity (%)	77	76	75	76	76	73	68	72	76	80	81	79	76
Mean monthly sunshine hours	133.3	118.7	155.0	183.0	195.3	237.0	275.9	257.3	201.0	151.9	117.0	114.7	2,140.1
Source 1: Servizio Meteorologico (temperature and precipitation data 1971–2000), NOAA(Extremes 1991-2020)
Source 2: Servizio Meteorologico (relative humidity and sun data 1961–1990)

== Demographics ==
As of 2026, the population is 31,362, of which 49.8% are male, and 50.2% are female. Minors make up 12.3% of the population, and seniors make up 27.7%.

Historical population

Year	Pop.	±%
1861	20,900	—
1871	23,095	+10.5%
1881	24,213	+4.8%
1901	25,043	+3.4%
1911	29,474	+17.7%
1921	29,491	+0.1%
1931	29,932	+1.5%
1936	30,384	+1.5%

Year	Pop.	±%
1951	26,043	−14.3%
1961	28,535	+9.6%
1971	27,620	−3.2%
1981	27,639	+0.1%
1991	27,948	+1.1%
2001	29,034	+3.9%
2011	30,736	+5.9%
2021	31,495	+2.5%

Source: ISTAT

=== Immigration ===
As of 2025, immigrants make up 12.8% of the population.

== Sport ==
Elba
- Association: Elba Island Football Association
- Confederation: CONIFA

First international
- Sicily 4–4 Elba (Sicily; 11 September 2021)

Biggest win
- Elba 5–0 Raetia (Capoliveri, Elba; 16 July 2022)

Biggest defeat
- Elba 0–2 Sardinia (Capoliveri, Elba; 11 September 2021)

The Elba football team represents the island. They were approved as a ConIFA member at the Annual General Meeting 2020. It is not affiliated with FIFA or UEFA, and therefore cannot compete for the FIFA World Cup or in the UEFA European Championship. It is, however, affiliated to ConIFA, and play in the ConIFA European Football Cup.

Elba Island played their first game as a ConIFA member on 11 September 2021 against the Sicily Football Team scoring a 4–4 tie against them.

== Transport ==
The island is connected to the mainland via the four ferry companies, Toremar, Moby Lines, Blunavy and Sardinia Ferries, all offering routes between Piombino and Portoferraio, the capital located in the north, Cavo, Rio Marina and Porto Azzurro, on the east coast of the island.

There is an airport on the island, Marina di Campo Airport. It is served by Silver Air with flights to the Italian mainland.

=== Cycling ===
The island has a network of trails for road racers looking for more technical routes for their training, trails and dirt roads for bikers to have fun on, and accessible routes for families with children who need safe and relaxing routes. On the road from Rio nell'Elba going to Porto Azzurro is the "Fonte di Coppi". Towards the end of his career, Fausto Coppi, the "campionissimo", came here to train on the roads of Elba. He still retained a celebrity status but was no longer at the peak of his career that ended with his death a few years later. The plaque on the fountain reads: "1960–2010, here the champion quenched his thirst, after fifty years on the run".

== Gallery ==
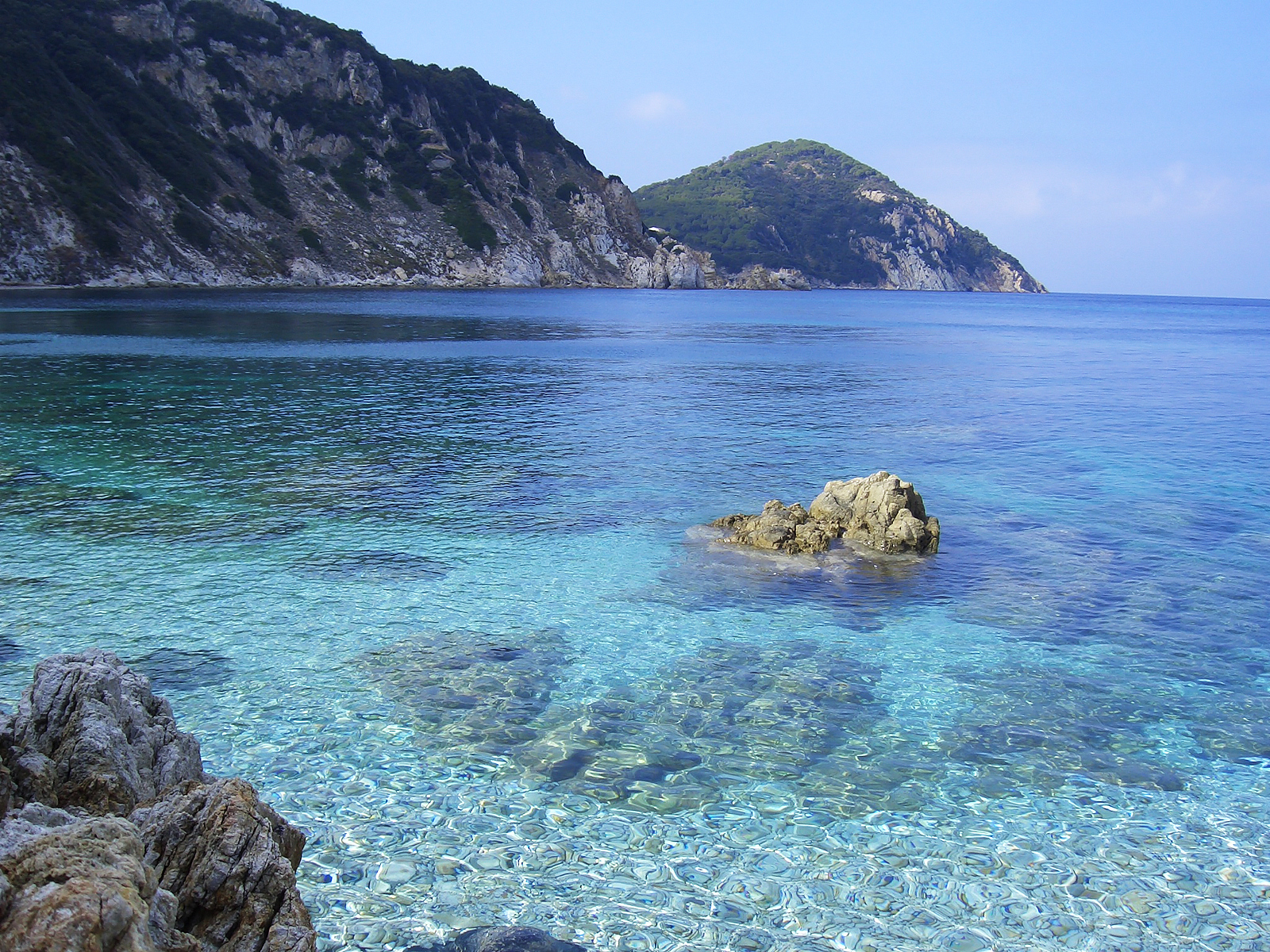
Enfola Beach

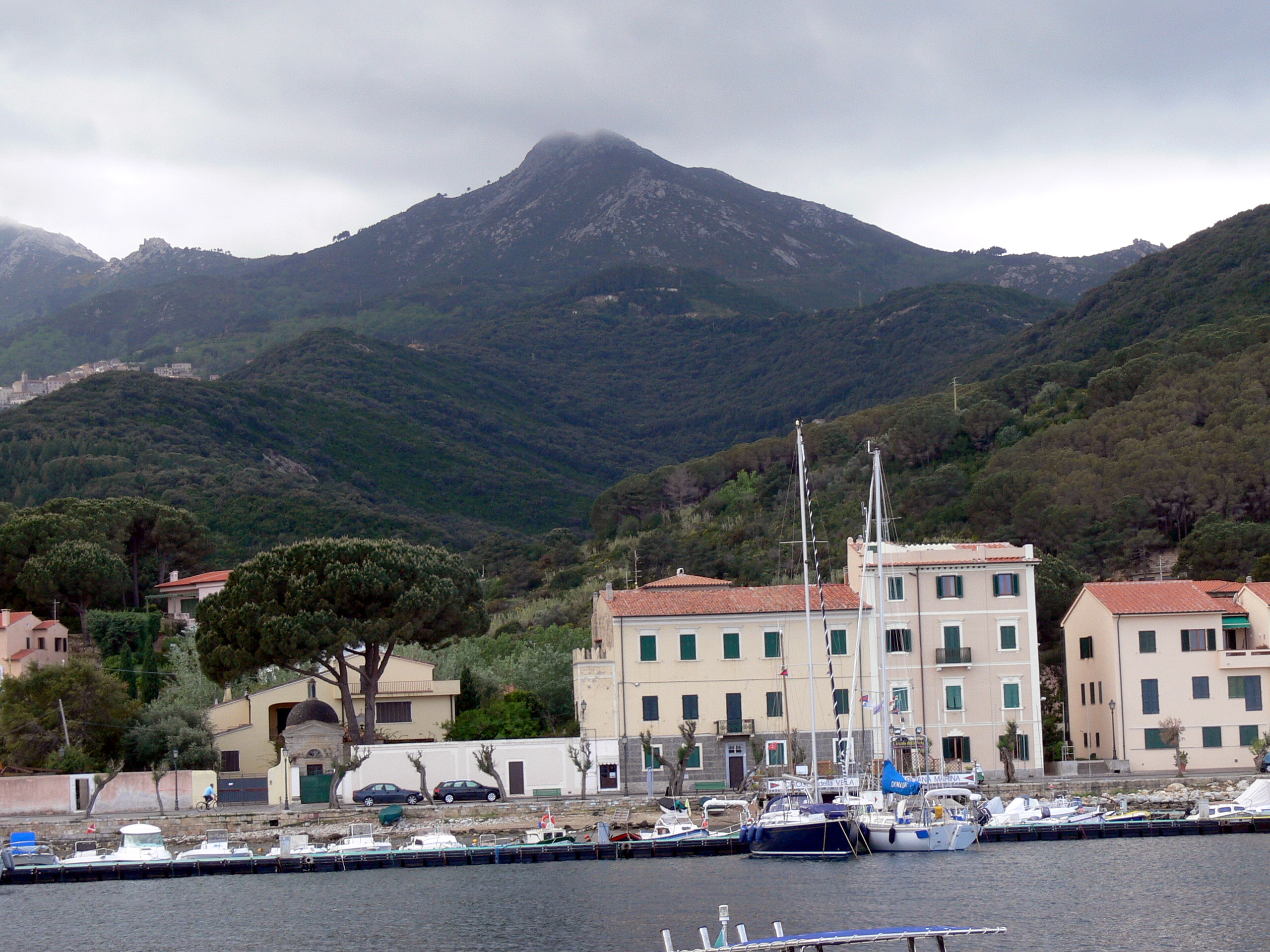
Marciana Marina

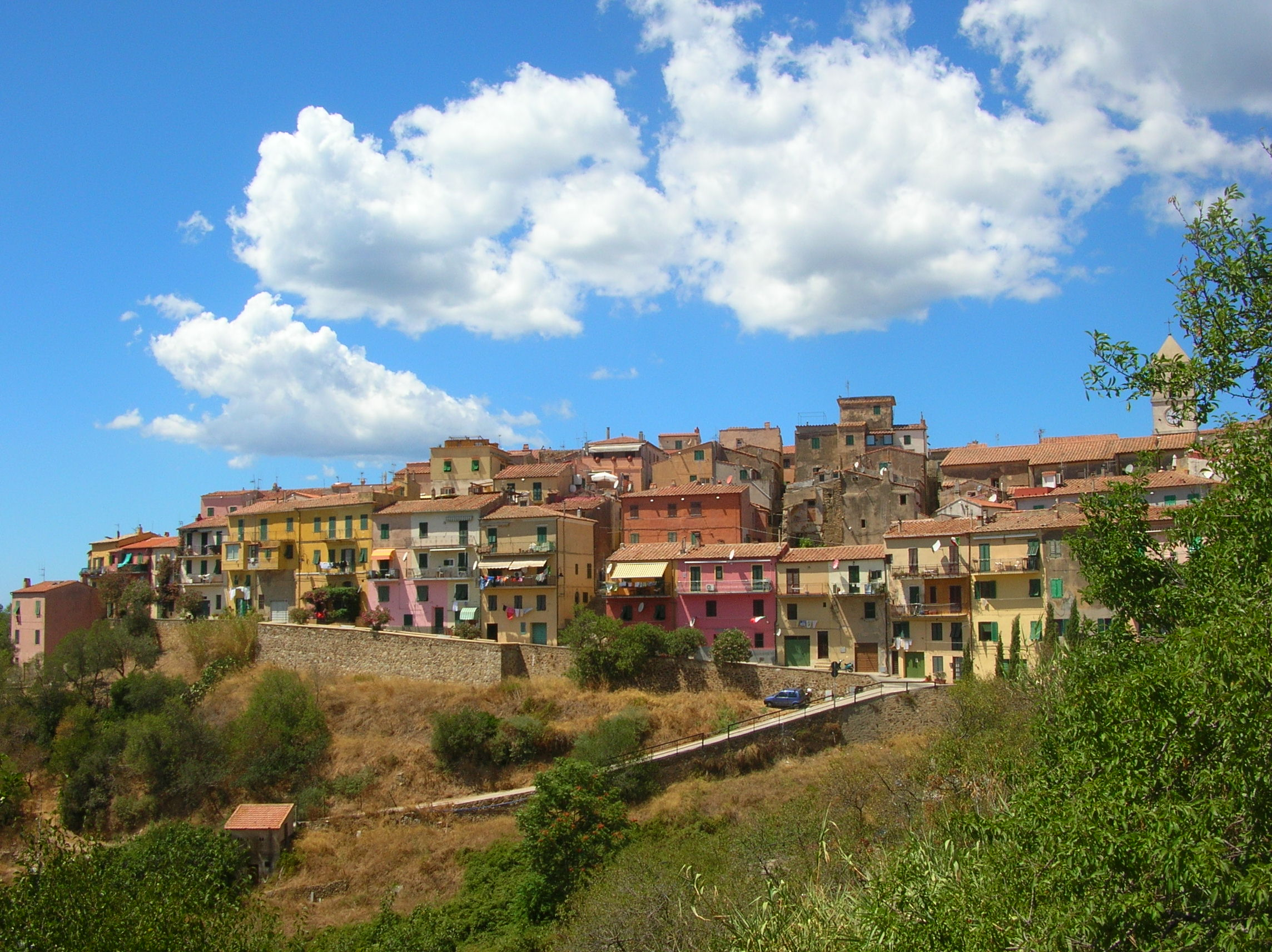
Capoliveri

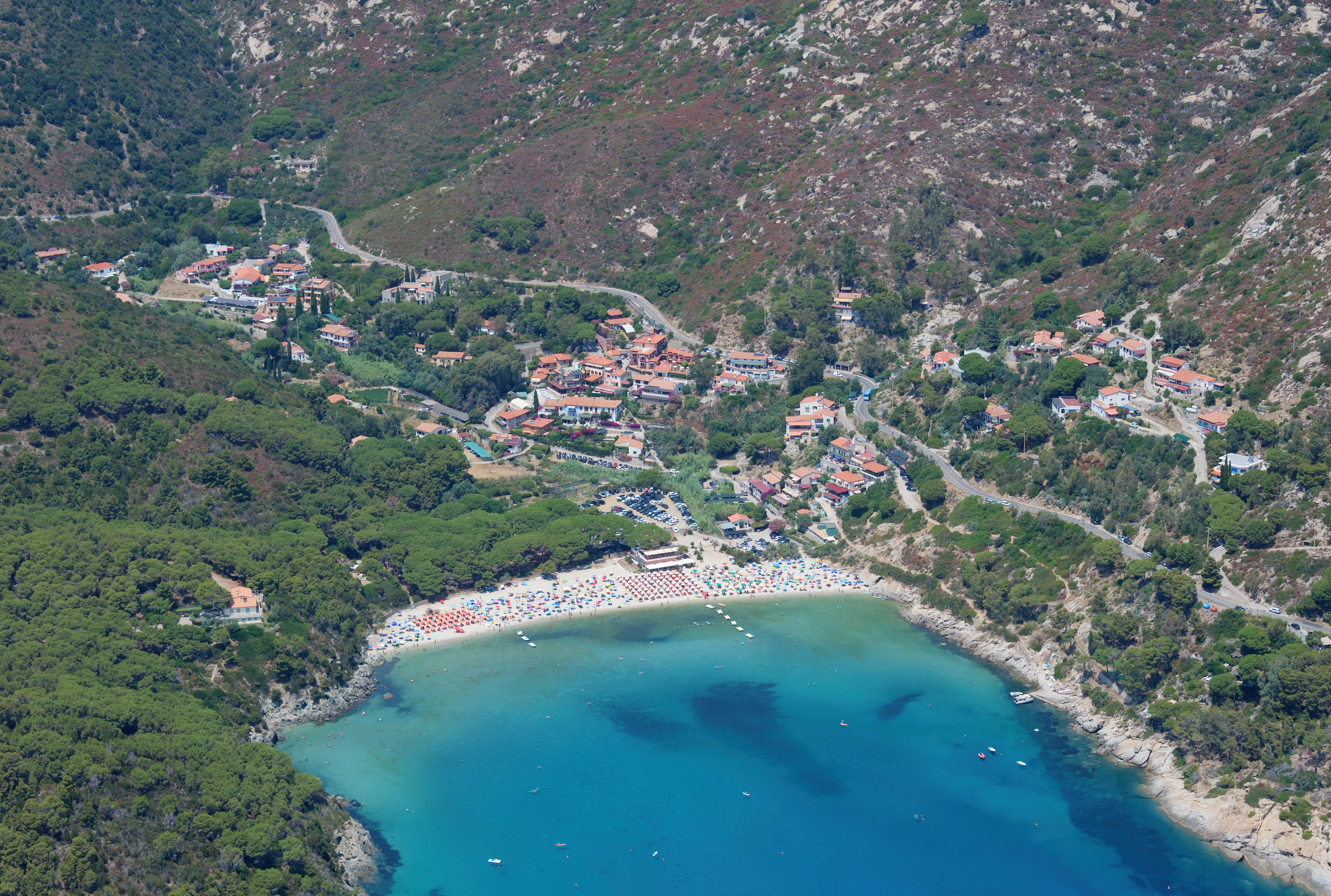
Fetovaia beach

Flag of Elba

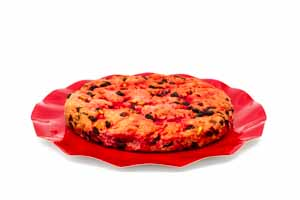
Schiaccia briaca (drunken cake) from Elba and Aleatico (Elban wine) used in the recipe

== See also ==
- List of islands of Italy
- Tuscan Archipelago
- The Count of Monte Cristo, 1844 novel by Alexandre Dumas
