= Principality of Elba =

1814–1815 Napoleon-ruled monarchy in Tuscany

Principality of Elba Principato d'Elba (Italian)
- 1814–1815
- Flag Coat of arms

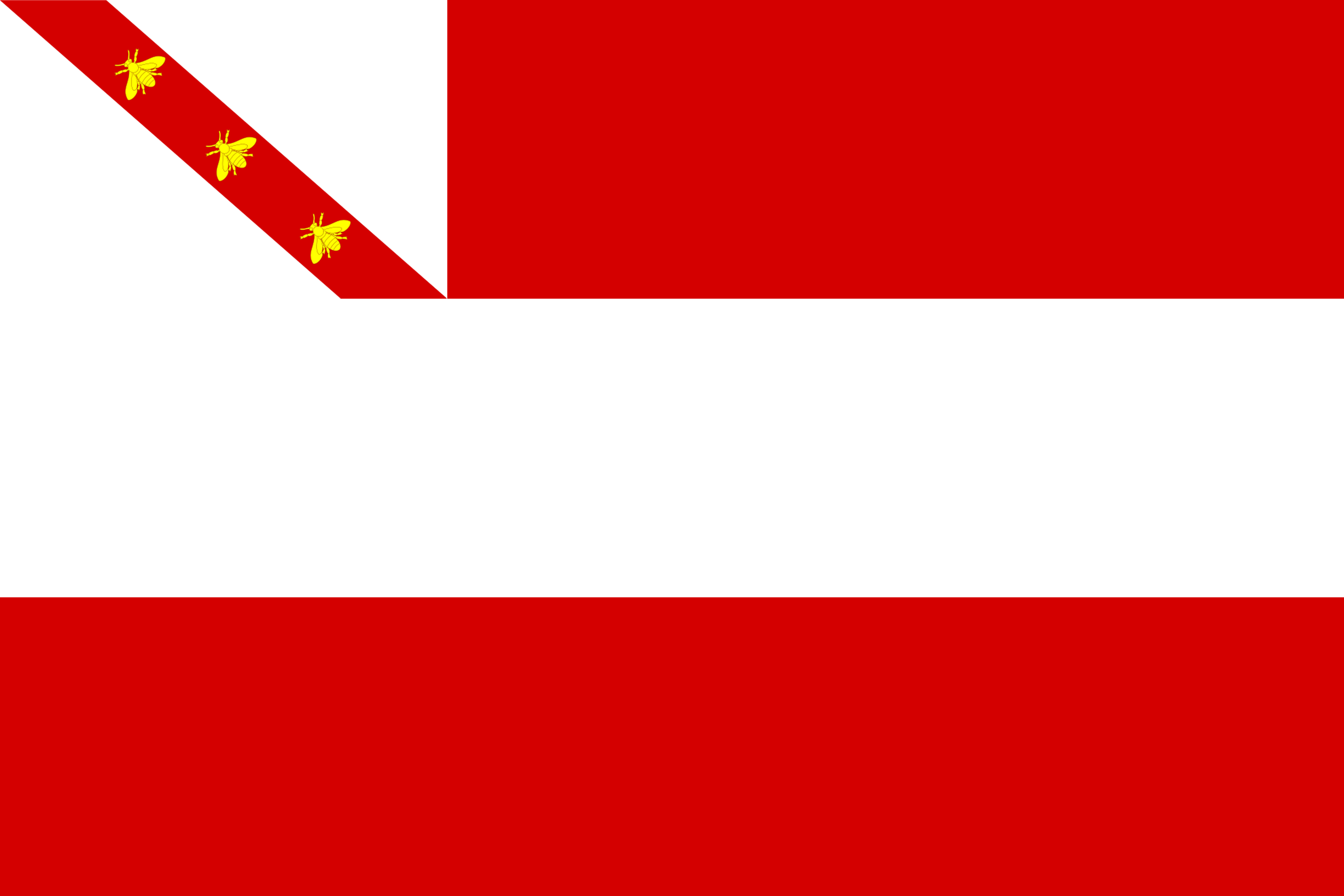
- Naval Jack

- Location of the Principality of Elba within Europe
- Capital: Portoferraio; 42°49′N 10°19′E
- Common languages: Italian, Elbano dialect
- Religion: Roman Catholic
- Demonym: Elban
- Government: Absolute monarchy
- Sovereign Prince of Elba
  - 1814–1815: Napoleon
- Governor of Elba
  - 1814–1815: Antoine Drouot
- Historical era: Napoleonic Wars
  - Treaty of Fontainebleau: 11 April 1814
  - Napoleon's departure: 26 February 1815
  - Congress of Vienna: 9 June 1815

Area
  - Total: 244.99 km^{2} (94.59 sq mi)
- Currency: Tuscan lira
Preceded by	Succeeded by
First French Empire	Grand Duchy of Tuscany
- Today part of: Italy

The Principality of Elba (Italian: Principato d'Elba) was a non-hereditary monarchy established on the Mediterranean island of Elba following the Treaty of Fontainebleau on 11 April 1814. It lasted less than a year, and its only head was Napoleon Bonaparte, who returned to rule in France before his ultimate defeat and the dissolution of the principality.

== Formation ==
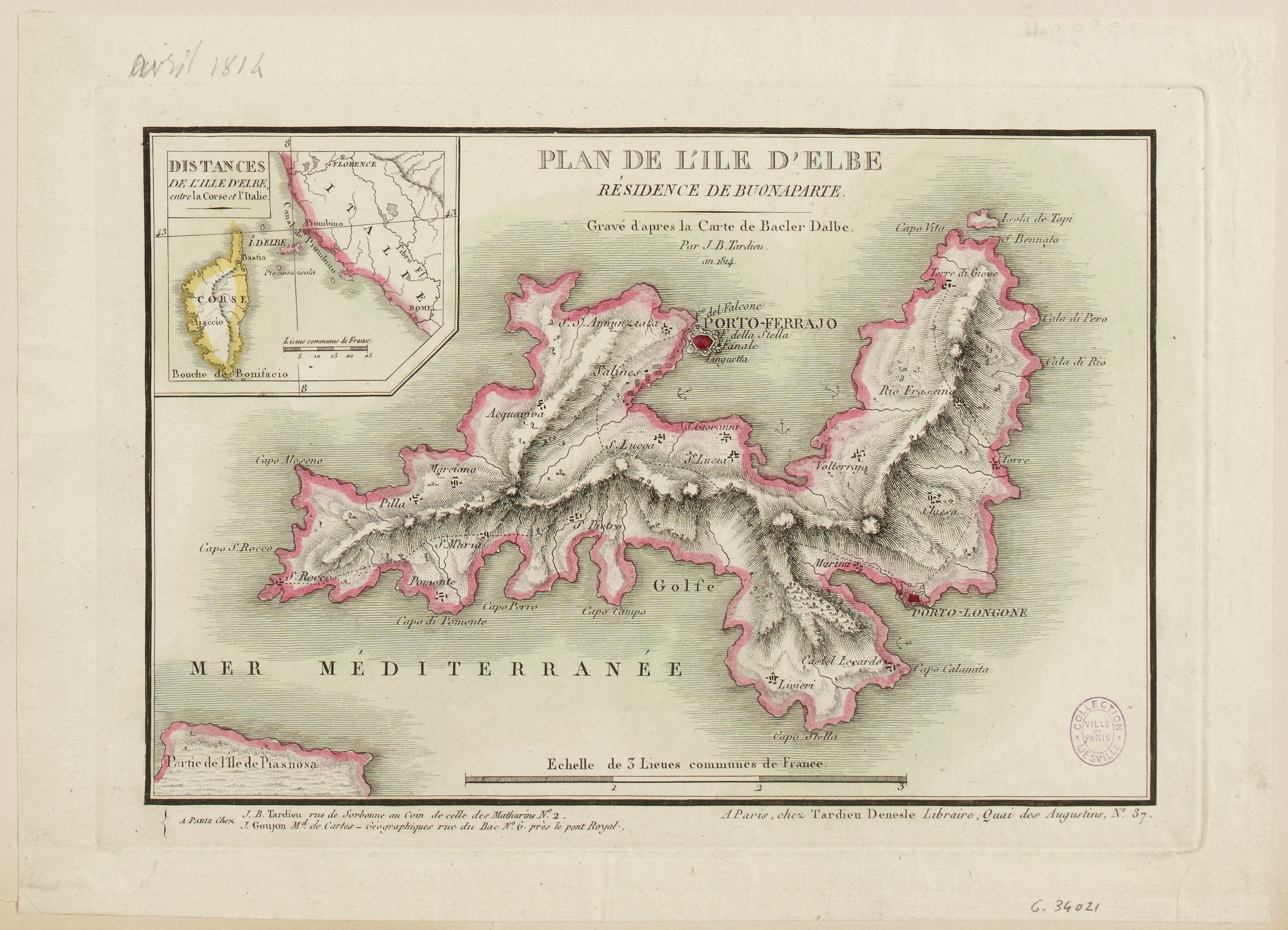
Map of Elba, 1814

Sovereignty over the island, which until then had been part of the French département of Méditerranée, was given to Napoleon I of France after his abdication following the War of the Sixth Coalition. Article 3 of the treaty stipulated that Elba was to be "an independent principality possessed by him in complete sovereignty and as personal property". His rule was to persist until his death, at which point control of the principality would pass to Tuscany. The former emperor of the French was also granted a stipend of two million francs per year to be paid by France.

== Napoleon's rule ==
In his few months on Elba, as well as creating a small navy and army, Napoleon developed the island's iron mines, oversaw the construction of new roads, issued decrees on modern agricultural methods, and overhauled the island's legal and educational system.

=== Napoleon's residence ===
The Villa Napoleonica (or Villa San Martino) is one of the two residences occupied in Portoferraio by Napoleon Bonaparte during his exile on the Island of Elba, where it was his summer residence. The second, the Palazzina dei Mulini, is located in the historic center of the town of Portoferraio, 3.5 km (2.2 mi) northeast of San Martino.

In 1839, Anatole Demidoff, a Russian industrialist and patron, a great admirer of Napoleon and husband of a niece of the emperor, Princess Mathilde Bonaparte, had the Florentine architect Niccolò Matas build the Demidoff Gallery at the foot of the original building.

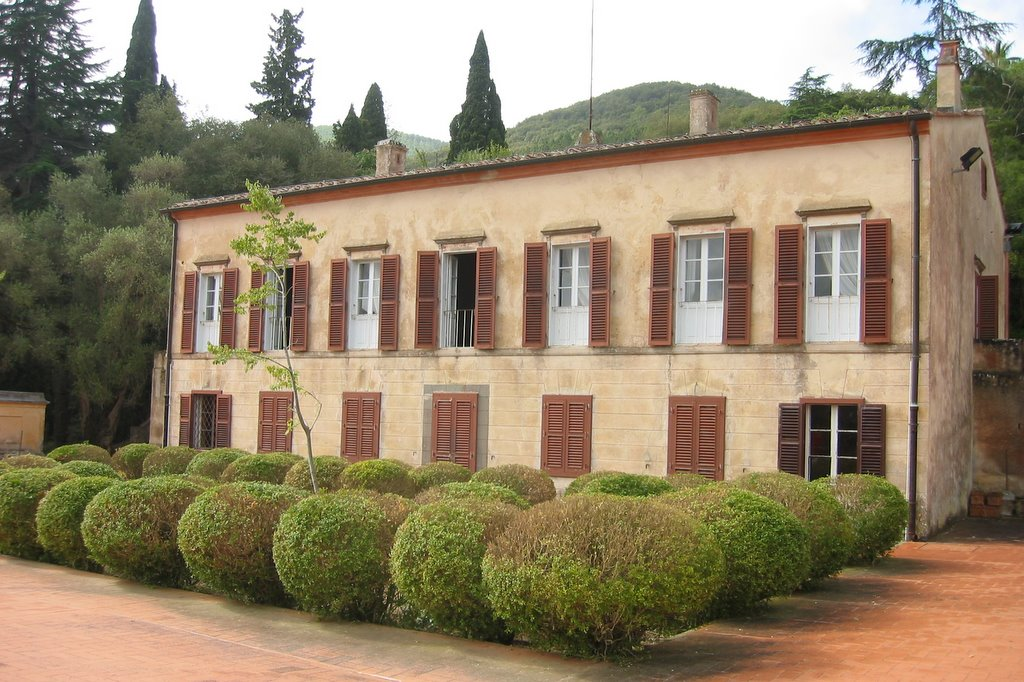
Villa San Martino

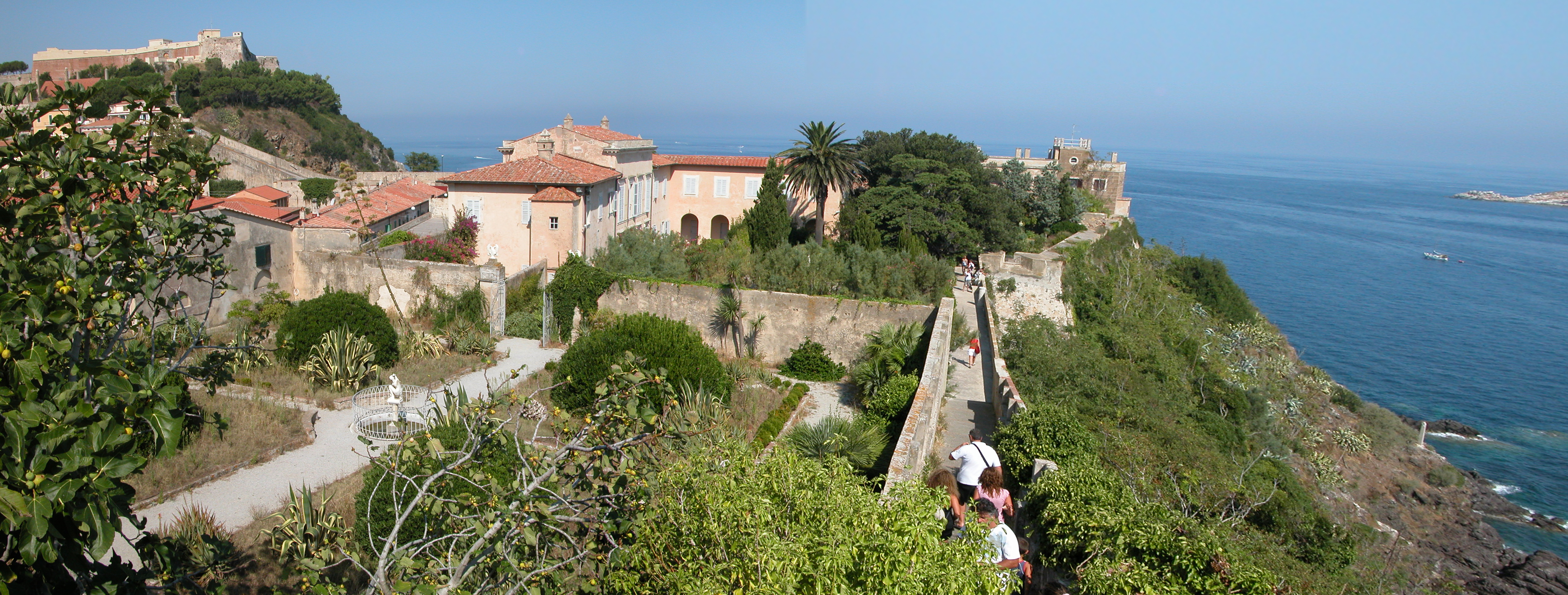
Palazzina dei Mulini

=== Cabinet ===
- Napoleon Bonaparte – Sovereign of Elba
- General Antoine Drouot – Governor of Elba
- Count Henri-Gatien Bertrand – grand marshal and chief of staff
- General Pierre Cambronne – commander of the Elban Guard
- Carlo Paoli – Mayor (Gonfaloniere) of Portoferraio
- Pietro Traditi – senior civil administrator
- Giuseppe Balbiani – treasurer and finance administrator

== Military ==
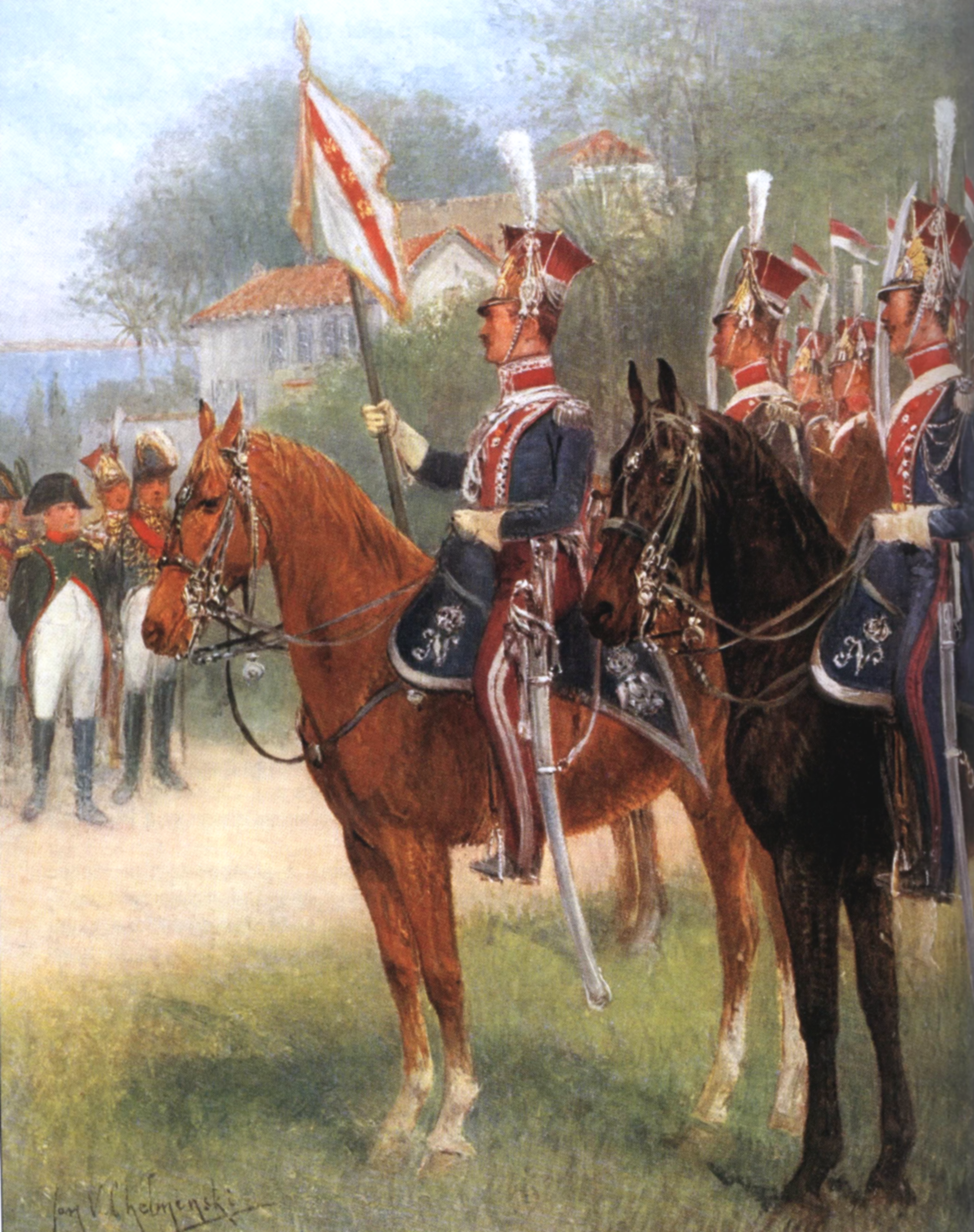
Napoleon inspecting the Elba squadron of the 1st Polish Light Cavalry Regiment

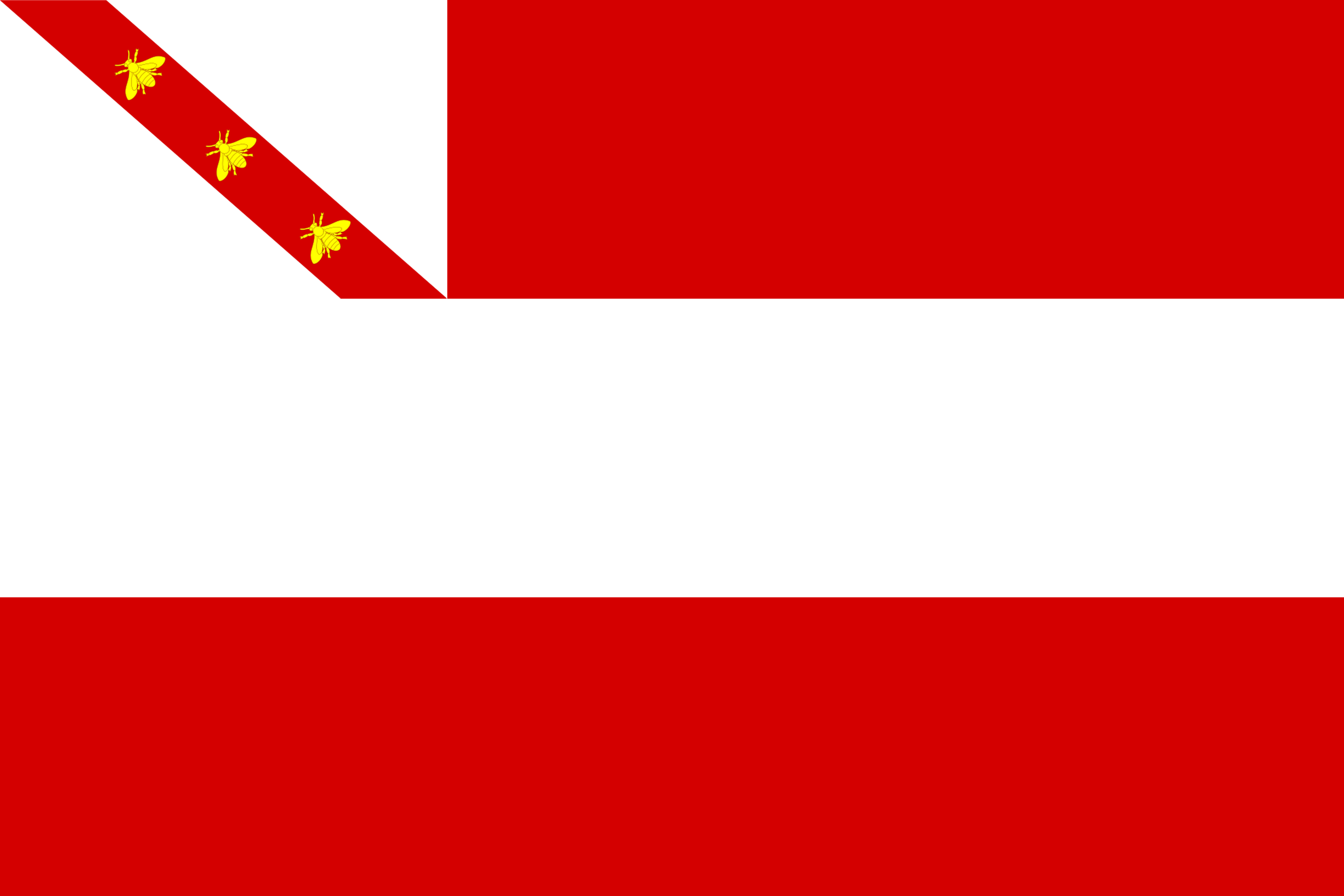
Naval jack of Elba

As allowed by the Treaty of Fontainebleau, Napoleon brought 870 men to the island with him from France. The army was made up of 566 from the elite Garde Impériale (both infantry and cavalry), and the remaining 300 were from a small battalion of grenadiers. The army was under the supervision of General Antoine Drouot and commanded by General Pierre Cambronne and the staff headquarters. The navy consisted of 66 men and one ship: the double-masted, 18-gunned brig, Inconstant. A small flotilla of two other sloops also accompanied Inconstant. The fleet was first commanded by Lieutenant François-Louis Taillade; however, after nearly losing Inconstant in a storm, Taillade was replaced by Lieutenant Jean François Chautard, who later ferried Napoleon back from Elba in 1815. Paoli Filidoro was appointed captain of the Gendarmerie and operated under Giuseppe Balbiani as intendant general. The combined armed forces by 1815 on Elba numbered about 1,000 men, costing over half of the island's treasury to pay, equip, and feed.

=== Commander ===
Pierre Jacques Étienne Cambronne was the commander of the guard for Napoleon Bonaparte during his exile in the Empire of Elba from 1814 to 1815. He led the small but loyal force tasked with protecting Napoleon and maintaining order on the island. Cambronne remained devoted to Napoleon and later rejoined him during the Hundred Days, fighting at the Battle of Waterloo. He became famous for his alleged defiant response when asked to surrender, cementing his reputation for loyalty and courage.

== Dissolution ==
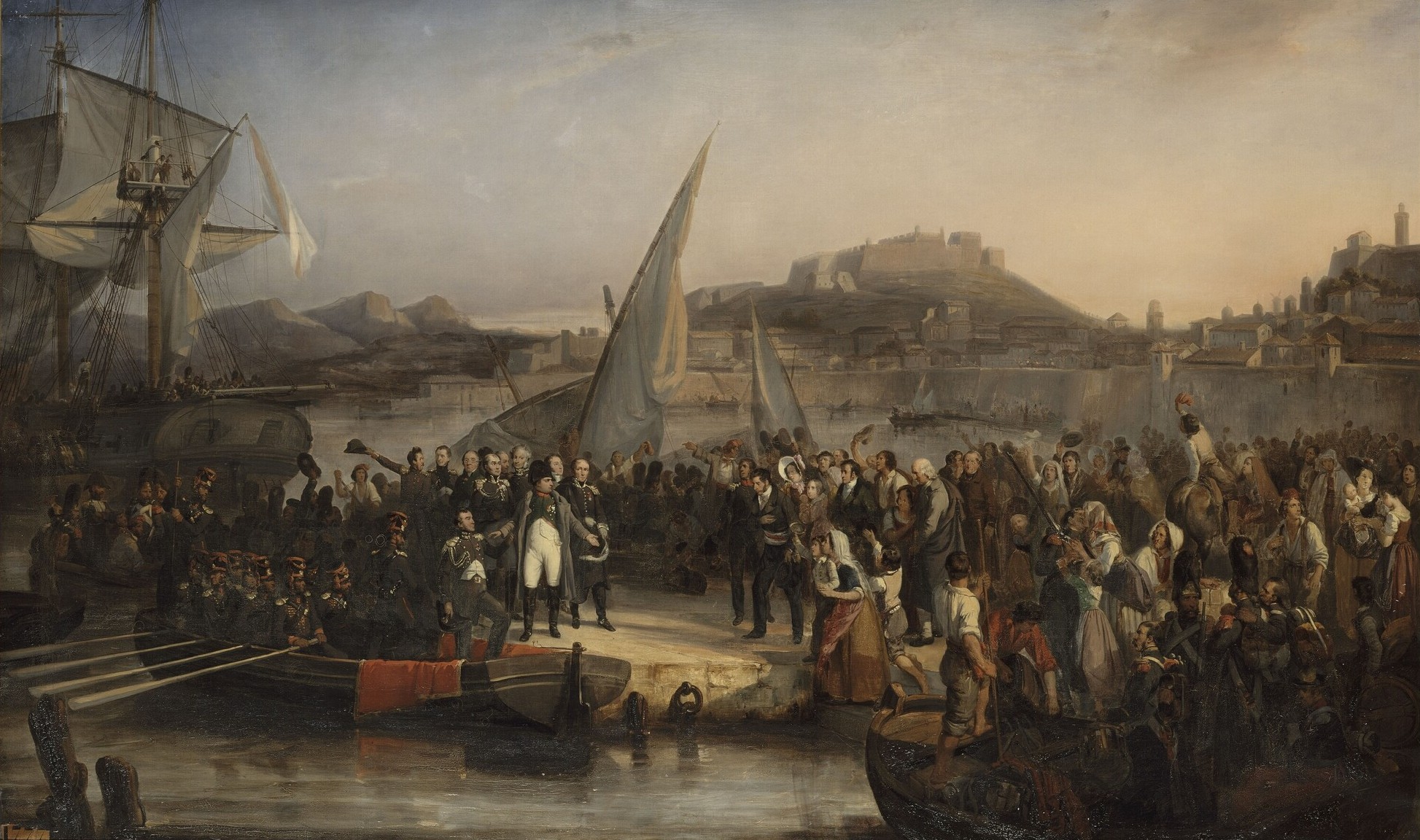
Napoleon's Departure from Elba by Joseph Beaume, 1836

On 26 February 1815, after ruling Elba for nearly ten months, Napoleon escaped from the island and landed in southern France to retake power, beginning the War of the Seventh Coalition. After his defeat at the Battle of Waterloo, Napoleon was transported by Britain to the island of Saint Helena, where he remained a prisoner until his death in 1821. At the Congress of Vienna, sovereignty of the island was transferred to the Grand Duchy of Tuscany.

== See also ==
- Napoleon I's first abdication
- Elba
- Napoleon Bonaparte
