= List of Lufthansa destinations =

Lufthansa serves a total of 229 airports. The list presents each destination by city, country, and airport name, with airline hubs indicated.

== List ==
| Country/region | City | Airport | Notes | Refs |
|---|---|---|---|---|
| Albania | Tirana | Tirana International Airport Nënë Tereza | | |
| Algeria | Algiers | Houari Boumediene Airport | | |
| Angola | Luanda | Dr. António Agostinho Neto International Airport | | |
| Angola | Luanda | Quatro de Fevereiro Airport | Airport closed | |
| Antigua and Barbuda | Antigua | V.C. Bird International Airport | Terminated | |
| Argentina | Buenos Aires | Ezeiza International Airport | | |
| Armenia | Yerevan | Zvartnots International Airport | | |
| Australia | Melbourne | Melbourne Airport | Terminated | |
| Australia | Sydney | Sydney Airport | Terminated | |
| Austria | Graz | Graz Airport | | |
| Austria | Innsbruck | Innsbruck Airport | Terminated | |
| Austria | Klagenfurt | Klagenfurt Airport | Terminated | |
| Austria | Linz | Linz Airport | Terminated | |
| Austria | Salzburg | Salzburg Airport | | |
| Austria | Vienna | Vienna International Airport | | |
| Azerbaijan | Baku | Heydar Aliyev International Airport | | |
| Bahamas | Nassau | Lynden Pindling International Airport | Terminated | |
| Bahrain | Manama | Bahrain International Airport | Terminated | |
| Bangladesh | Dhaka | Shahjalal International Airport | Terminated | |
| Belarus | Minsk | Minsk National Airport | Terminated | |
| Belgium | Brussels | Brussels Airport | | |
| Bolivia | La Paz | El Alto International Airport | Terminated | |
| Bosnia and Herzegovina | Sarajevo | Sarajevo International Airport | | |
| Brazil | Rio de Janeiro | Rio de Janeiro/Galeão International Airport | | |
| Brazil | São Paulo | São Paulo/Guarulhos International Airport | | |
| Bulgaria | Sofia | Sofia Airport | | |
| Bulgaria | Varna | Varna Airport | | |
| Cameroon | Douala | Douala International Airport | Terminated | |
| Canada | Calgary | Calgary International Airport | Terminated | |
| Canada | Montreal | Montréal–Trudeau International Airport | | |
| Canada | Toronto | Toronto Pearson International Airport | | |
| Canada | Vancouver | Vancouver International Airport | | |
| Cape Verde | Sal | Amílcar Cabral International Airport | Terminated | |
| Chile | Santiago | Arturo Merino Benítez International Airport | Terminated | |
| China | Beijing | Beijing Capital International Airport | | |
| China | Guangzhou | Guangzhou Baiyun International Airport | Terminated | |
| China | Guangzhou | Old Guangzhou Baiyun International Airport | Airport closed | |
| China | Nanjing | Nanjing Lukou International Airport | Terminated | |
| China | Qingdao | Qingdao Jiaodong International Airport | Terminated | |
| China | Qingdao | Qingdao Liuting International Airport | Airport closed | |
| China | Shanghai | Shanghai Pudong International Airport | | |
| China | Shenyang | Shenyang Taoxian International Airport | Terminated | |
| Colombia | Bogotá | El Dorado International Airport | | |
| Costa Rica | San José | Juan Santamaría International Airport | | |
| Croatia | Dubrovnik | Dubrovnik Airport | Seasonal | |
| Croatia | Pula | Pula Airport | Seasonal | |
| Croatia | Rijeka | Rijeka Airport | Seasonal | |
| Croatia | Split | Split Airport | Seasonal | |
| Croatia | Zadar | Zadar Airport | Seasonal | |
| Croatia | Zagreb | Zagreb Airport | | |
| Cyprus | Larnaca | Larnaca International Airport | | |
| Cyprus | Paphos | Paphos International Airport | | |
| Czech Republic | Brno | Brno–Tuřany Airport | Terminated | |
| Czech Republic | Prague | Václav Havel Airport Prague | | |
| Democratic Republic of Congo | Kinshasa | N'djili Airport | Terminated | |
| Denmark | Aalborg | Aalborg Airport | Terminated | |
| Denmark | Billund | Billund Airport | | |
| Denmark | Copenhagen | Copenhagen Airport | | |
| Dominican Republic | Santo Domingo | Las Américas International Airport | Terminated | |
| Ecuador | Guayaquil | José Joaquín de Olmedo International Airport | Terminated | |
| Ecuador | Quito | Mariscal Sucre International Airport | Terminated | |
| Egypt | Alexandria | El Nouzha Airport | Airport closed | |
| Egypt | Cairo | Cairo International Airport | | |
| Egypt | Hurghada | Hurghada International Airport | | |
| Egypt | Sharm El Sheikh | Sharm El Sheikh International Airport | | |
| Equatorial Guinea | Malabo | Malabo International Airport | | |
| Eritrea | Asmara | Asmara International Airport | Terminated | |
| Estonia | Tallinn | Tallinn Airport | | |
| Ethiopia | Addis Ababa | Addis Ababa Bole International Airport | Terminated | |
| Finland | Helsinki | Helsinki Airport | | |
| Finland | Ivalo | Ivalo Airport | Seasonal | |
| Finland | Kittilä | Kittilä Airport | Seasonal | |
| Finland | Kuusamo | Kuusamo Airport | Seasonal | |
| Finland | Rovaniemi | Rovaniemi Airport | Seasonal | |
| Finland | Turku | Turku Airport | Terminated | |
| France | Bastia | Bastia–Poretta Airport | Seasonal | |
| France | Biarritz | Biarritz Pays Basque Airport | Seasonal | |
| France | Bordeaux | Bordeaux–Mérignac Airport | | |
| France | Figari | Figari–Sud Corse Airport | | |
| France | Lille | Lille Airport | Terminated | |
| France | Lyon | Lyon–Saint-Exupéry Airport | | |
| France | Marseille | Marseille Provence Airport | | |
| France | Montpellier | Montpellier–Méditerranée Airport | | |
| France | Nantes | Nantes Atlantique Airport | | |
| France | Nice | Nice Côte d'Azur Airport | | |
| France | Paris | Charles de Gaulle Airport | | |
| France | Paris | Orly Airport | Terminated | |
| France | Rennes | Rennes Airport | | |
| France | Saint-Tropez | La Môle–Saint-Tropez Airport | Terminated | |
| France | Strasbourg | Strasbourg Airport | | |
| France | Toulouse | Toulouse–Blagnac Airport | | |
| Gabon | Libreville | Libreville International Airport | Terminated | |
| Georgia | Tbilisi | Tbilisi International Airport | | |
| Germany | Berlin | Berlin Brandenburg Airport | | |
| Germany | Berlin | Berlin Tegel Airport | Airport closed | |
| Germany | Bremen | Bremen Airport | | |
| Germany | Cologne/Bonn | Cologne Bonn Airport | | |
| Germany | Dortmund | Dortmund Airport | Terminated | |
| Germany | Dresden | Dresden Airport | | |
| Germany | Düsseldorf | Düsseldorf Airport | | |
| Germany | Frankfurt | Frankfurt Airport | Hub | |
| Germany | Friedrichshafen | Friedrichshafen Airport | Terminated | |
| Germany | Hamburg | Hamburg Airport | | |
| Germany | Hanover | Hannover Airport | | |
| Germany | Heringsdorf | Heringsdorf Airport | Seasonal | |
| Germany | Leipzig/Halle | Leipzig/Halle Airport | | |
| Germany | Munich | Munich Airport | Hub | |
| Germany | Munich | Munich-Riem Airport | Airport closed | |
| Germany | Münster/Osnabrück | Münster Osnabrück Airport | | |
| Germany | Nuremberg | Nuremberg Airport | | |
| Germany | Paderborn | Paderborn Lippstadt Airport | Terminated | |
| Germany | Rostock/Laage | Rostock–Laage Airport | Terminated | |
| Germany | Stuttgart | Stuttgart Airport | | |
| Germany | Sylt | Sylt Airport | Seasonal | |
| Ghana | Accra | Kotoka International Airport | Terminated | |
| Greece | Athens | Athens International Airport | | |
| Greece | Athens | Ellinikon International Airport | Airport closed | |
| Greece | Heraklion | Heraklion International Airport | Seasonal | |
| Greece | Kalamata | Kalamata Airport | | |
| Greece | Mykonos | Mykonos Airport | | |
| Greece | Rhodes | Rhodes International Airport | | |
| Greece | Thessaloniki | Thessaloniki Airport | Seasonal | |
| Greece | Zakynthos | Zakynthos International Airport | | |
| Hong Kong | Hong Kong | Hong Kong International Airport | | |
| Hong Kong | Hong Kong | Kai Tak Airport | Airport closed | |
| Hungary | Budapest | Budapest Ferenc Liszt International Airport | | |
| Hungary | Debrecen | Debrecen International Airport | | |
| Iceland | Reykjavík | Keflavík International Airport | | |
| India | Bengaluru | Kempegowda International Airport | | |
| India | Chennai | Chennai International Airport | | |
| India | Delhi | Indira Gandhi International Airport | | |
| India | Hyderabad | Rajiv Gandhi International Airport | Terminated | |
| India | Kolkata | Netaji Subhas Chandra Bose International Airport | Terminated | |
| India | Mumbai | Chhatrapati Shivaji Maharaj International Airport | | |
| India | Pune | Pune Airport | | |
| Indonesia | Denpasar | Ngurah Rai International Airport | Terminated | |
| Indonesia | Jakarta | Soekarno–Hatta International Airport | Terminated | |
| Iran | Mashhad | Mashhad International Airport | Terminated | |
| Iran | Tehran | Imam Khomeini International Airport | | |
| Iraq | Baghdad | Baghdad International Airport | Terminated | |
| Iraq | Erbil | Erbil International Airport | | |
| Ireland | Cork | Cork Airport | Seasonal | |
| Ireland | Dublin | Dublin Airport | | |
| Ireland | Knock | Ireland West Airport | Seasonal | |
| Ireland | Shannon | Shannon Airport | Seasonal | |
| Israel | Eilat | Ovda Airport | Terminated | |
| Israel | Eilat | Ramon Airport | Suspended | |
| Israel | Tel Aviv | Ben Gurion Airport | | |
| Italy | Ancona | Marche Airport | | |
| Italy | Bari | Bari Karol Wojtyła Airport | | |
| Italy | Bergamo | Milan Bergamo Airport | Terminated | |
| Italy | Bologna | Bologna Guglielmo Marconi Airport | | |
| Italy | Cagliari | Cagliari Elmas Airport | | |
| Italy | Catania | Catania–Fontanarossa Airport | | |
| Italy | Elba | Marina di Campo Airport | Terminated | |
| Italy | Florence | Florence Airport | | |
| Italy | Genoa | Genoa Cristoforo Colombo Airport | | |
| Italy | Lamezia Terme | Lamezia Terme International Airport | Seasonal | |
| Italy | Milan | Milan Linate Airport | | |
| Italy | Milan | Milan Malpensa Airport | | |
| Italy | Naples | Naples International Airport | | |
| Italy | Olbia | Olbia Costa Smeralda Airport | | |
| Italy | Palermo | Palermo Airport | | |
| Italy | Perugia | Perugia San Francesco d'Assisi – Umbria International Airport | Terminated | |
| Italy | Pisa | Pisa International Airport | | |
| Italy | Rome | Rome Fiumicino Airport | | |
| Italy | Trieste | Trieste Airport | | |
| Italy | Turin | Turin Airport | | |
| Italy | Venice | Venice Marco Polo Airport | | |
| Italy | Verona | Verona Villafranca Airport | | |
| Ivory Coast | Abidjan | Félix-Houphouët-Boigny International Airport | Terminated | |
| Jamaica | Kingston | Norman Manley International Airport | Terminated | |
| Japan | Nagoya | Chubu Centrair International Airport | Terminated | |
| Japan | Osaka | Itami Airport | Terminated | |
| Japan | Osaka | Kansai International Airport | | |
| Japan | Tokyo | Haneda Airport | | |
| Japan | Tokyo | Narita International Airport | Terminated | |
| Jersey | Jersey | Jersey Airport | Seasonal | |
| Jordan | Amman | Queen Alia International Airport | | |
| Kazakhstan | Almaty | Almaty International Airport | | |
| Kazakhstan | Astana | Nursultan Nazarbayev International Airport | | |
| Kenya | Nairobi | Jomo Kenyatta International Airport | | |
| Kuwait | Kuwait City | Kuwait International Airport | Seasonal | |
| Latvia | Riga | Riga International Airport | | |
| Lebanon | Beirut | Beirut–Rafic Hariri International Airport | | |
| Libya | Benghazi | Benina International Airport | Terminated | |
| Libya | Tripoli | Tripoli International Airport | Terminated | |
| Lithuania | Vilnius | Vilnius Airport | | |
| Luxembourg | Luxembourg | Luxembourg Airport | | |
| Malaysia | Kuala Lumpur | Kuala Lumpur International Airport | Resumes 25 October 2026 | |
| Malaysia | Kuala Lumpur | Sultan Abdul Aziz Shah Airport | Terminated | |
| Maldives | Malé | Velana International Airport | | |
| Malta | Luqa | Malta International Airport | | |
| Mauritius | Port Louis | Sir Seewoosagur Ramgoolam International Airport | | |
| Mexico | Cancún | Cancún International Airport | | |
| Mexico | Mexico City | Mexico City International Airport | | |
| Moldova | Chişinău | Chişinău International Airport | | |
| Morocco | Agadir | Agadir–Al Massira Airport | Terminated | |
| Morocco | Casablanca | Mohammed V International Airport | | |
| Morocco | Marrakesh | Marrakesh Menara Airport | | |
| Morocco | Tangier | Tangier Ibn Battouta Airport | Terminated | |
| Namibia | Windhoek | Hosea Kutako International Airport | Terminated | |
| Nepal | Kathmandu | Tribhuvan International Airport | Terminated | |
| Netherlands | Amsterdam | Amsterdam Airport Schiphol | | |
| Netherlands | Rotterdam | Rotterdam The Hague Airport | Terminated | |
| New Zealand | Auckland | Auckland Airport | Terminated | |
| Nigeria | Abuja | Nnamdi Azikiwe International Airport | | |
| Nigeria | Lagos | Murtala Muhammed International Airport | | |
| Nigeria | Port Harcourt | Port Harcourt International Airport | | |
| Norway | Bergen | Bergen Flesland Airport | | |
| Norway | Oslo | Oslo Gardermoen Airport | | |
| Norway | Stavanger | Stavanger Airport | | |
| Norway | Tromsø | Tromsø Airport | Seasonal | |
| Norway | Trondheim | Trondheim Airport | Seasonal | |
| Oman | Muscat | Muscat International Airport | Terminated | |
| Pakistan | Karachi | Jinnah International Airport | Terminated | |
| Pakistan | Lahore | Allama Iqbal International Airport | Terminated | |
| Panama | Panama City | Tocumen International Airport | Terminated | |
| Paraguay | Asunción | Silvio Pettirossi International Airport | Terminated | |
| Peru | Lima | Jorge Chávez International Airport | Terminated | |
| Philippines | Manila | Ninoy Aquino International Airport | Terminated | |
| Poland | Gdańsk | Gdańsk Lech Wałęsa Airport | | |
| Poland | Katowice | Katowice Airport | | |
| Poland | Kraków | Kraków John Paul II International Airport | | |
| Poland | Łódź | Łódź Władysław Reymont Airport | Terminated | |
| Poland | Lublin | Lublin Airport | | |
| Poland | Poznań | Poznań–Ławica Airport | | |
| Poland | Rzeszów | Rzeszów–Jasionka Airport | | |
| Poland | Warsaw | Warsaw Chopin Airport | | |
| Poland | Wrocław | Copernicus Airport Wrocław | | |
| Portugal | Faro | Faro Airport | Seasonal | |
| Portugal | Funchal | Madeira Airport | | |
| Portugal | Lisbon | Lisbon Airport | | |
| Portugal | Ponta Delgada | John Paul II Ponta Delgada Airport | Seasonal | |
| Portugal | Porto | Porto Airport | | |
| Puerto Rico | San Juan | Luis Muñoz Marín International Airport | Terminated | |
| Qatar | Doha | Hamad International Airport | Terminated | |
| Republic of the Congo | Pointe-Noire | Agostinho-Neto International Airport | Terminated | |
| Romania | Bucharest | Bucharest Henri Coandă International Airport | | |
| Romania | Cluj-Napoca | Cluj International Airport | | |
| Romania | Iasi | Iasi International Airport | | |
| Romania | Sibiu | Sibiu International Airport | | |
| Romania | Timișoara | Traian Vuia International Airport | | |
| Russia | Kazan | Kazan International Airport | Terminated | |
| Russia | Moscow | Moscow Domodedovo Airport | Terminated | |
| Russia | Moscow | Sheremetyevo International Airport | Terminated | |
| Russia | Moscow | Vnukovo International Airport | Terminated | |
| Russia | Nizhny Novgorod | Nizhny Novgorod International Airport | Terminated | |
| Russia | Novosibirsk | Tolmachevo Airport | Terminated | |
| Russia | Perm | Perm International Airport | Terminated | |
| Russia | Rostov-on-Don | Rostov-on-Don Airport | Airport closed | |
| Russia | Saint Petersburg | Pulkovo Airport | Terminated | |
| Russia | Samara | Kurumoch International Airport | Terminated | |
| Russia | Sochi | Sochi International Airport | Terminated | |
| Russia | Ufa | Ufa International Airport | Terminated | |
| Russia | Yekaterinburg | Koltsovo International Airport | Terminated | |
| Saudi Arabia | Dammam | King Fahd International Airport | | |
| Saudi Arabia | Jeddah | King Abdulaziz International Airport | | |
| Saudi Arabia | Riyadh | King Khalid International Airport | Suspended | |
| Senegal | Dakar | Léopold Sédar Senghor International Airport | Terminated | |
| Serbia | Belgrade | Belgrade Nikola Tesla Airport | | |
| Singapore | Singapore | Changi Airport | | |
| Sint Maarten | Philipsburg | Princess Juliana International Airport | Terminated | |
| Slovakia | Bratislava | Bratislava Airport | Terminated | |
| Slovenia | Ljubljana | Ljubljana Airport | | |
| South Africa | Cape Town | Cape Town International Airport | | |
| South Africa | Johannesburg | O. R. Tambo International Airport | | |
| South Korea | Busan | Gimhae International Airport | Terminated | |
| South Korea | Seoul | Gimpo International Airport | Terminated | |
| South Korea | Seoul | Incheon International Airport | | |
| Spain | Alicante | Alicante–Elche Miguel Hernández Airport | | |
| Spain | Asturias | Asturias Airport | Seasonal | |
| Spain | Barcelona | Josep Tarradellas Barcelona–El Prat Airport | | |
| Spain | Bilbao | Bilbao Airport | | |
| Spain | Fuerteventura | Fuerteventura Airport | | |
| Spain | Ibiza | Ibiza Airport | Seasonal | |
| Spain | Jerez de la Frontera | Jerez Airport | | |
| Spain | Las Palmas | Gran Canaria Airport | | |
| Spain | Madrid | Madrid–Barajas Airport | | |
| Spain | Málaga | Málaga Airport | | |
| Spain | Menorca | Menorca Airport | | |
| Spain | Palma de Mallorca | Palma de Mallorca Airport | | |
| Spain | Pamplona | Pamplona Airport | Suspended | |
| Spain | Santiago de Compostela | Santiago–Rosalía de Castro Airport | | |
| Spain | Seville | Seville Airport | | |
| Spain | Tenerife | Tenerife North Airport | Terminated | |
| Spain | Tenerife | Tenerife South Airport | | |
| Spain | Valencia | Valencia Airport | | |
| Sri Lanka | Colombo | Bandaranaike International Airport | Terminated | |
| Sudan | Khartoum | Khartoum International Airport | Terminated | |
| Sweden | Gothenburg | Göteborg Landvetter Airport | | |
| Sweden | Gothenburg | Torslanda Airport | Airport closed | |
| Sweden | Stockholm | Stockholm Arlanda Airport | | |
| Switzerland | Geneva | Geneva Airport | Terminated | |
| Switzerland | Zurich | Zurich Airport | | |
| Switzerland; France; Germany | Basel; Mulhouse; Freiburg | EuroAirport Basel Mulhouse Freiburg | | |
| Syria | Aleppo | Aleppo International Airport | Terminated | |
| Syria | Damascus | Damascus International Airport | Terminated | |
| Taiwan | Taipei | Taoyuan International Airport | Terminated | |
| Tanzania | Dar es Salaam | Julius Nyerere International Airport | Terminated | |
| Thailand | Bangkok | Don Mueang International Airport | Terminated | |
| Thailand | Bangkok | Suvarnabhumi Airport | | |
| Tunisia | Tunis | Tunis–Carthage International Airport | | |
| Turkey | Ankara | Ankara Esenboğa Airport | Terminated | |
| Turkey | Antalya | Antalya Airport | | |
| Turkey | Bodrum | Milas–Bodrum Airport | Seasonal | |
| Turkey | Bursa | Yenişehir Airport | Terminated | |
| Turkey | Istanbul | Atatürk Airport | Airport closed | |
| Turkey | Istanbul | Istanbul Airport | | |
| Turkey | İzmir | İzmir Adnan Menderes Airport | | |
| Turkmenistan | Ashgabat | Ashgabat International Airport | Terminated | |
| Uganda | Kampala | Entebbe International Airport | Terminated | |
| Ukraine | Donetsk | Donetsk International Airport | Airport closed | |
| Ukraine | Kyiv | Boryspil International Airport | Terminated | |
| Ukraine | Lviv | Lviv International Airport | Terminated | |
| Ukraine | Odessa | Odesa International Airport | Terminated | |
| United Arab Emirates | Abu Dhabi | Zayed International Airport | Terminated | |
| United Arab Emirates | Dubai | Dubai International Airport | | |
| United Kingdom | Aberdeen | Aberdeen Airport | Terminated | |
| United Kingdom | Belfast | Belfast City Airport | Terminated | |
| United Kingdom | Birmingham | Birmingham Airport | | |
| United Kingdom | Bristol | Bristol Airport | Terminated | |
| United Kingdom | Edinburgh | Edinburgh Airport | | |
| United Kingdom | Glasgow | Glasgow Airport | Terminated | |
| United Kingdom | Liverpool | Liverpool John Lennon Airport | Terminated | |
| United Kingdom | London | Gatwick Airport | Terminated | |
| United Kingdom | London | Heathrow Airport | | |
| United Kingdom | London | London Stansted Airport | | |
| United Kingdom | Manchester | Manchester Airport | | |
| United Kingdom | Newcastle upon Tyne | Newcastle International Airport | Terminated | |
| United States | Atlanta | Hartsfield Jackson Atlanta International Airport | | |
| United States | Austin | Austin–Bergstrom International Airport | | |
| United States | Boston | Logan International Airport | | |
| United States | Charlotte | Charlotte Douglas International Airport | | |
| United States | Chicago | O'Hare International Airport | | |
| United States | Columbus | John Glenn Columbus International Airport | Begins 5 May 2027 | |
| United States | Dallas | Dallas Fort Worth | | |
| United States | Denver | Denver International Airport | | |
| United States | Detroit | Detroit Metropolitan Airport | | |
| United States | Houston | George Bush Intercontinental Airport | | |
| United States | Los Angeles | Los Angeles International Airport | | |
| United States | Miami | Miami International Airport | | |
| United States | New York | John F. Kennedy International Airport | | |
| United States | Newark | Newark Liberty International Airport | | |
| United States | Phoenix | Phoenix Sky Harbor International Airport | Begins 3 August 2027 | |
| United States | Raleigh | Raleigh–Durham International Airport | | |
| United States | San Diego | San Diego International Airport | | |
| United States | San Francisco | San Francisco International Airport | | |
| United States | Seattle | Seattle–Tacoma International Airport | | |
| United States | St. Louis | St. Louis Lambert International Airport | | |
| United States | Washington | Dulles International Airport | | |
| Vietnam | Hanoi | Noi Bai International Airport | Terminated | |
| Vietnam | Ho Chi Minh City | Tan Son Nhat International Airport | Terminated | |
