= Oreste Del Buono =

Italian writer, translator, journalist, critic

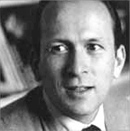
- Born: 5 March 1923; Poggio, Marciana, Marciana, Island of Elba, Livorno, Italy
- Died: 30 September 2003 (aged 80); Rome, Italy
- Education: University of Milan
- Occupations: Author; Journalist; Translator; Literary critic Screenwriter
- Parent(s): Alessandro del Buono; Vincenzina Tesei

Oreste Del Buono (5 March 1923 – 30 September 2003) was an Italian author, journalist, translator, literary critic and screenwriter.

== Life ==
=== Family provenance ===
Oreste Del Buono (often identified both by himself and by others simply as "OdB") was born at Poggio, a small village a couple of kilometers inland from the western coast of the island of Elba. He was the eldest of the three children of Alessandro and Vincenzina Tesei del Buono. The family was an ancient and distinguished one. Oreste's mother's younger brother, Teseo Tesei (1909–1941) was a naval officer who later became a noted war hero. His paternal grandfather, Pilade Del Buono (1852 - 1930), was an entrepreneurial mining engineer and briefly a prominent politician.

=== Early years ===
While he was still young, Oreste Del Buono's grandfather suffered major financial losses in Venezuela and "Villa del Pianello", till then his childhood home, was sold. His parents moved the family first to Florence and then to Rome where del Buono attended a Montessori school. He moved to Milan for the 1935/36 school year, and here he completed his school career at the recently established but already prestigious "Giovanni Berchet classical lyceum". He went on to enrol at the Milan university faculty of law in 1941 and then, without finishing his course of study, and possibly in response to pressure from his mother, enlisted in the navy in July 1943, just a few days before The Leader was dismissed from office by what would at the time have been seen by many as his own "Fascist Grand Council".

On 8 September 1943 the new Italian government, reacting to evidently irresistible pressure from the advancing Anglo-American forces in the south, proclaimed an armistice. The German military moved rapidly to disarm the armed forces of their former Italian allies, liberate Mussolini and create a puppet Italian state covering central and northern Italy. Shortly after the proclamation of the armistice, Oreste Del Buono was captured by the Germans during the fighting for control of the Island of Brioni He spent a year and a half as a prisoner of war, detained in the remote concentration camp by the Gerlos Pass, located among the high mountains east of Innsbruck. He managed to escape but after finding himself unable to get very far, and briefly taking refuge in another concentration camp in the area where he was "denounced by a Polish inmate", he found himself reporting back to the concentration camp from which he had escaped, explaining to the camp commander – if his later autobiographical recall is to be believed – "You were not there: how could I tell you I was going away?". (Note: "Lei non-c’era, come potevo dirle che me ne andavo?")

== Work ==
=== Translations ===
Del Buono was a prolific translator, principally from French. Areas of special expertise included science fiction, detective fiction sport and advertising. On the subject of advertising he also contributed a regular column in the Milan-based magazine, Panorama between April 1987 and February 1992. The column subsequently resurfaced in L'espresso, a rival publication. Among his more notable literary translations into Italian were those of Шинель (The Overcoat) by Gogol, Flaubert's Madame Bovary, Proust's Du côté de chez Swann from the seven volume "À la recherche du temps perdu" set and Le Bleu du Ciel (Blue of Noon)by Georges Bataille. Among his other translations worthy of note were books by André Gide, Guy de Maupassant, Michel Butor, Michel Tournier, Marguerite Yourcenar, Nathalie Sarraute, Denis Diderot, Benjamin Constant and Claude Gutman. His portfolio of English translations included works by Raymond Chandler, Robert Louis Stevenson, Arthur Conan Doyle, Oscar Wilde, Horace Walpole and Ian Fleming.

=== Novels ===
Del Buono was a fringe member of the Group 63 circle of "Neoavanguardia" novelists. His 1961 novel "Per pura ingratitudine", published by Feltrinelli, was representative of this genre. His first novel, "Racconto d'inverno", had appeared in 1945, and remains one of his most striking books. It shares its name, presumably consciously, with the Italian version of Shakespeare's 1623 Winter's Tale. Although the book is classified as a novel, much of the telling detail is lifted unapologetically from the author's personal experiences during the eighteen months that he spent as an involuntary guest at a German mountain concentration camp during 1943–45. His other novels included "Un intero minuto" ("An entire minute", 1959), "L'amore senza storie" (1960), "Né vivere né morire" ("Neither living nor dead", 1966), "Un tocco in più" ("One more touch", 1966), "I peggiori anni della nostra vita" ("The worst years of our life", 1971), "La nostra età", ("Our era" 1974), "La parte difficile" ("The difficult bit", 1975 and republished 2003), "La parte difficile" ("Come back!", 1976), "Un'ombra dietro il cuore" ("A shadow behind the heart", 1978), "Il comune spettatore" ("The shared viewer", 1979), "Se m'innamorassi di te" ("Falling in love with you", 1980), "La talpa di città" ("The urban mole", 1984), "La nostra classe dirigente" ("Our ruling class", 1986), "La debolezza di scrivere" ("The weakness for writing", 1987), "La vita sola" ("One life", 1989), "Acqua alla gola" ("Water down the throat", 1992) and "Amici, amici degli amici, maestri" ("Friends, friend of friends, leaders", 1994).

=== Literary journalist-commentator ===
He worked as a contributing editor for a number of Italy's larger newspaper and magazine publishers, including Rizzoli, Bompiani and Garzanti. He used the opportunities this gave him to introduce readers to many foreign writers who had hitherto be unknown domestically. But he also brought to the fore and then nurtured works by a large number of younger and otherwise unknown Italian authors such as Achille Campanile, Giovannino Guareschi and Giorgio Scerbanenco, Carletto Manzoni, Tiziano Sclavi, Renato Olivieri, Marcello Marchesi, Giorgio Forattini Emilio Giannelli, Augusto De Angelis, Paolo Villaggio and Giulio Angioni. Above all, he was an enthusiastic promoter of what one or two more staid critics might have dismissed as "popular culture". He teamed up with the young Umberto Eco to compile a tongue-in-cheek but resolutely straight-faced collection of seven essays in celebration of James Bond. He also compiled an early Encyclopaedia of Italian popular comics ("fumetti"). Published in 1969, at a time when many intellectuals were inclined to take a dismissive approach to "kids' comics", the work pioneered a more serious evaluation of an important tranche of popular culture. A generation later the del Buono approach had for many become mainstream.

His appointment as editorial director of linus in 1972 brought him to the attention of a wider public. He ran the publication till 1981. The magazine focused exclusively on "fumetti". Del Buono's long-standing fascination with children's (and adults') comics del Buono to be identified in a number of quarters as "the man who discovered Peanuts in (and for) Italy".

An important aspect of del Buono's literary contribution was its sheer eclecticism. His volume on Billy Wilder, comprising two monograph's on the cinema legend, was published in 1958. Over the years he also made himself an authority on another icon of the big screen, Federico Fellini. In 1980/81 he enjoyed a brief career as a pundit and sports commentator, featuring on the news broadcasts fronted by Maurizio Costanzo on the short-lived PIN (non-government owned television channel) launched by the Rizzoli Group. He also worked on the Turinese newspaper La Stampa, imposing his own approach on the Specchio dei tempi (Mirror of the times) column which he contributed in succession to Giulio De Benedetti.

=== Broadcast media ===
Del Buono's television work included his 1965 collaboration with Franco Enriquez on the screenplay for the television mini-series version of Resurrezione (based on Tolstoy's 1899 novel Resurrection).

For the RAI, the national broadcaster, he worked with Carmelo Bene to develop Le interviste impossibili ("The impossible interviews"), focusing on fantasy interviews with celebrities from the past. Subjects included Edmondo De Amicis, Fyodor Dostoevsky and Vladimir Mayakovsky. The actor Bene played the parts of the interviewees.

== Publications (selection) ==
- Racconto d'inverno, Milano, Edizioni di Uomo, 1945.
- La parte difficile, Milano, Mondadori, 1947.
- Acqua alla gola, Milano, Mondadori, 1953.
- L'amore senza storie, Milano, Feltrinelli, 1958.
- Billy Wilder (saggistica), Parma, Guanda, 1958.
- Un intero minuto, Milano, Feltrinelli, 1969.
- Per pura ingratitudine, Milano, Feltrinelli, 1961.
- Facile da usare, Milano, Feltrinelli, 1962.
- Alberto Moravia (saggistica), Milano, Feltrinelli, 1962.
- Niente per amore (teatro), Milano, Feltrinelli, 1962.
- Né vivere né morire, Milano, Mondadori, 1963.
- La terza persona, Milano, Mondadori, 1965.
- Federico Fellini (saggistica), Monza, Cinestudio, 1965.
- Un tocco in più (saggistica, con Gianni Rivera), Milano, Rizzoli, 1966.
- Piero della Francesca (saggistica), Milano, Rizzoli, 1967.
- Dalla Corea al Quirinale (saggistica, con Gianni Rivera), Milano, Rizzoli, 1968.
- I peggiori anni della nostra vita, Torino, Einaudi, 1971.
- La fine del romanzo, Torino, Einaudi, 1973.
- Poco da ridere. Storia privata della satira politica dall'«Asino» a «Linus» (saggistica), Bari, De Donato, 1976.
- Il comune spettatore (saggistica), Milano, Garzanti, 1979.
- Se mi innamorassi di te, Milano, Longanesi, 1980.
- La talpa di città, Roma-Napoli, Theoria, 1984.
- Amori neri, Roma-Napoli, Theoria, 1985.
- La nostra classe dirigente, Milano, Mondadori, 1986.
- La debolezza di scrivere, Venezia, Marsilio, 1987.
- La vita sola, Venezia, Marsilio, 1989. Premio Nazionale Letterario Pisa di Narrativa.
- Amici, amici degli amici, maestri..., Milano, Baldini & Castoldi, 1994.
Also worthy of mention are the anthologies he compiled and edited, sometimes in collaboration with his friend Lietta Tornabuoni and his many translations of literary classics from French and English.
