= Campo nell'Elba =

- Comune
- Comune di Campo nell'Elba
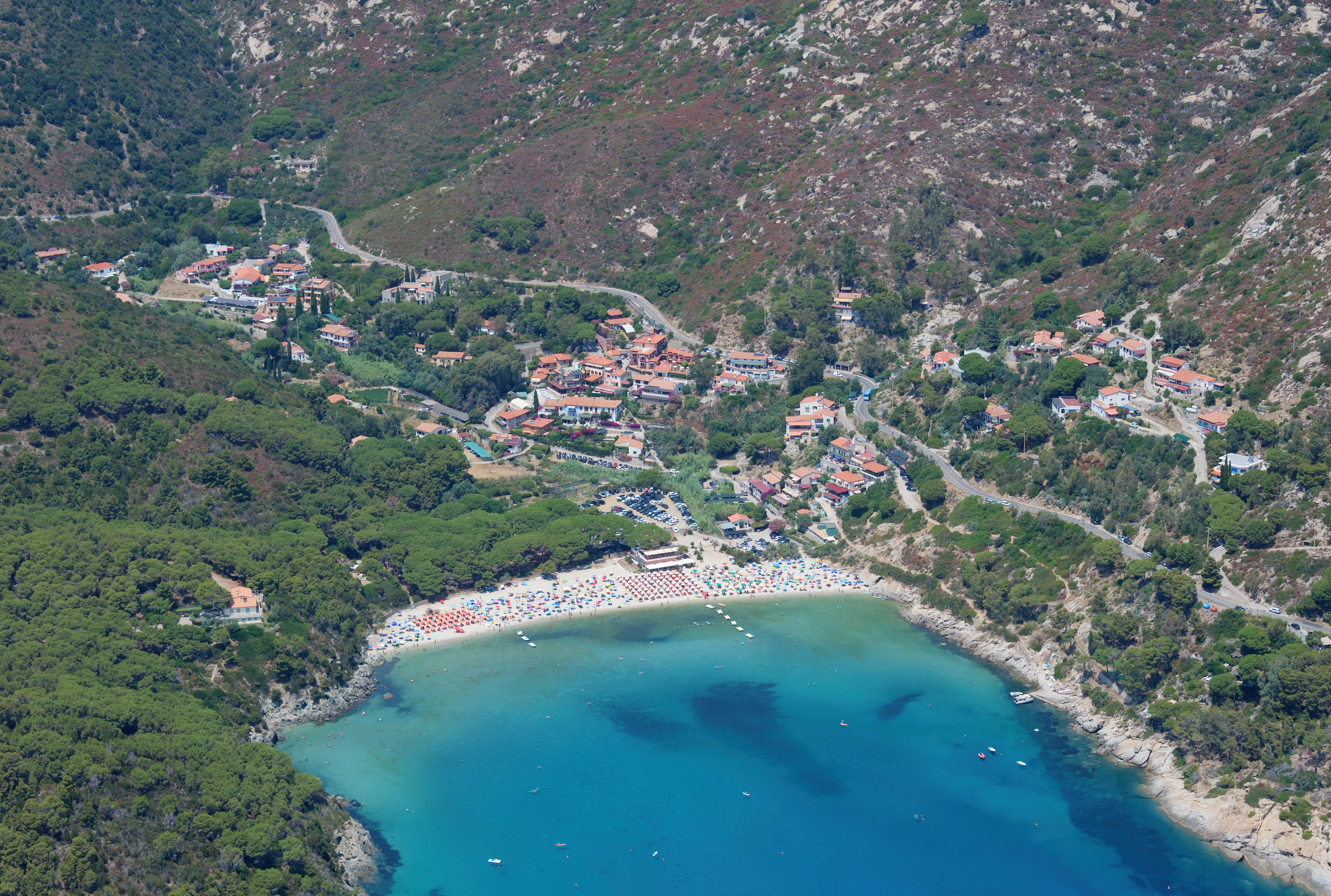
- Beach of Fetovaia

- Flag

- Location within Italy Location within Tuscany
- Coordinates: 42°45′N 10°14′E
- Country: Italy
- Region: Tuscany
- Province: Livorno (LI)
- Frazioni: La Pila, Marina di Campo, Pianosa, San Piero in Campo, Sant'Ilario in Campo, Seccheto

Government
  - Mayor: Davide Montauti

Area
  - Total: 55.79 km^{2} (21.54 sq mi)
- Elevation: 2 m (6.6 ft)

Population (2026)
  - Total: 4,629
  - Density: 82.97/km^{2} (214.9/sq mi)
- Demonym: Campesi
- Time zone: UTC+1 (CET)
  - Summer (DST): UTC+2 (CEST)
- Postal code: 57034
- Dialing code: 0565
- Patron saint: St. Gaetano of Thiene
- Saint day: August 7
- Website: Official website

Campo nell'Elba (Italian for 'Field on Elba') is a comune (municipality) on the island of Elba, in the Province of Livorno in the region of Tuscany in Italy, located about 140 kilometres (87 mi) southwest of Florence and about 90 kilometres (56 mi) south of Livorno. It has 4,629 inhabitants.

Campo nell'Elba borders the municipalities of Capoliveri, Marciana, and Portoferraio.

== Demographics ==
As of 2026, the population is 4,629, of which 50.2% are male, and 49.8% are female. Minors make up 12.2% of the population, and seniors make up 27.2%.

Historical population

Year	Pop.	±%
1861	2,165	—
1871	2,939	+35.8%
1881	2,834	−3.6%
1901	3,623	+27.8%
1911	3,038	−16.1%
1921	3,723	+22.5%
1931	3,288	−11.7%
1936	3,696	+12.4%

Year	Pop.	±%
1951	4,231	+14.5%
1961	4,064	−3.9%
1971	4,066	+0.0%
1981	4,148	+2.0%
1991	4,274	+3.0%
2001	4,155	−2.8%
2011	4,553	+9.6%
2021	4,706	+3.4%

Source: ISTAT

=== Immigration ===
As of 2025, immigrants make up 12.6% of the population. The 5 largest foreign countries of birth are Moldova, Romania, Switzerland, Ukraine, and Germany.

== See also ==
- Monte Capanne
- Marina di Campo Airport
- Monte Poro Lighthouse
