= San Piero in Campo =

- Frazione
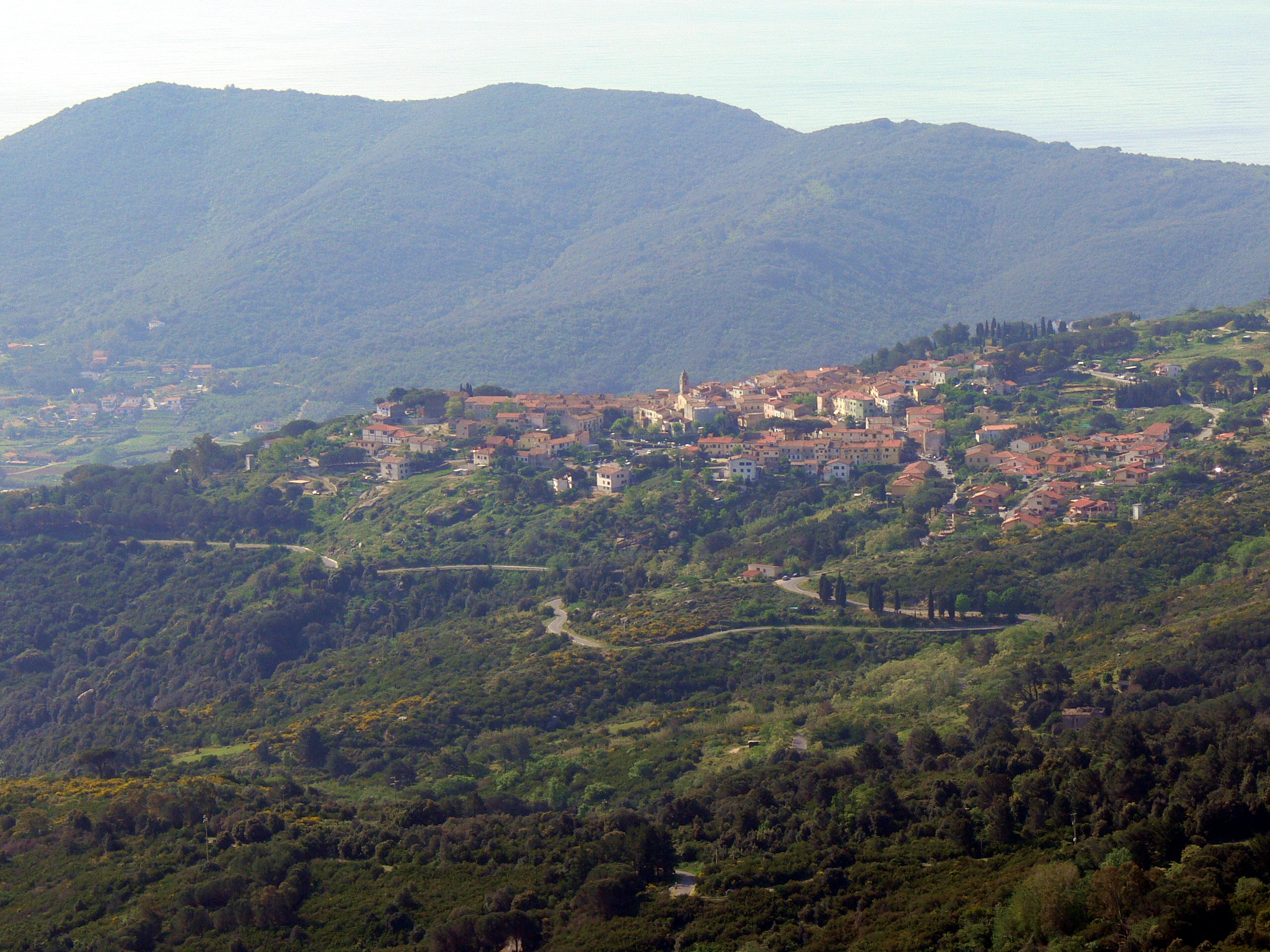
- View of San Piero in Campo

- Location of San Piero in Campo in Italy
- Coordinates: 42°45′9″N 10°12′37″E
- Country: Italy
- Region: Tuscany
- Province: Livorno (LI)
- Comune: Campo nell'Elba
- Elevation: 227 m (745 ft)

Population (2011)
  - Total: 589
- Time zone: UTC+1 (CET)
  - Summer (DST): UTC+2 (CEST)
- Postal code: 57034
- Dialing code: (+39) 0565

San Piero in Campo is a village in Tuscany, central Italy, administratively a frazione of the comune of Campo nell'Elba, province of Livorno. At the time of the 2011 census its population was 589.

San Piero in Campo is located on the Elba Island and it is about 3 km from the municipal seat of Marina di Campo.

== Bibliography ==
- Guide d'Italia. Toscana. Milan: Touring Club Italiano. 2012. p. 464.
- Zecchini, Michelangelo (2001). Isola d'Elba. Le origini. Lucca.
