= La Pila =

- Frazione
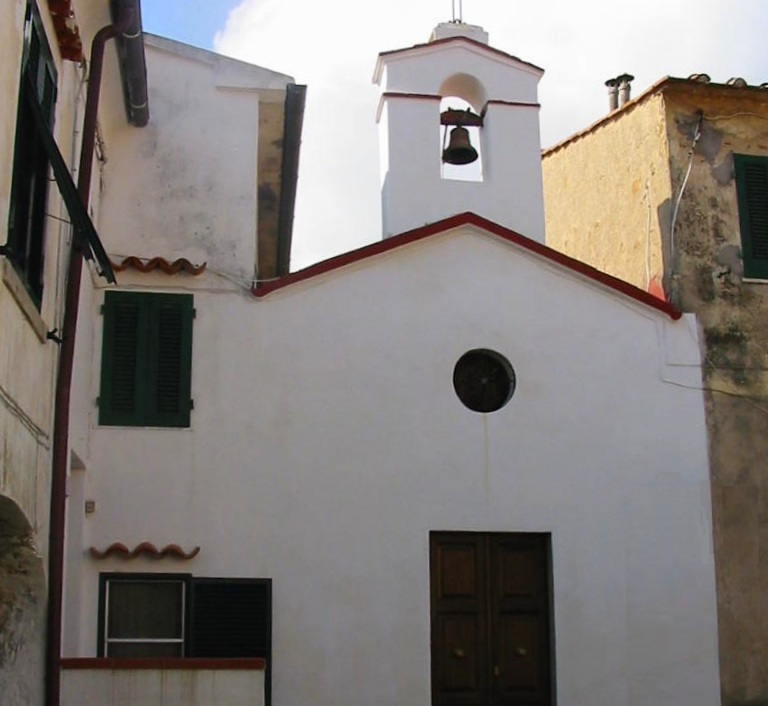
- The chapel of San Martino in La Pila

- Location of La Pila in Italy
- Coordinates: 42°45′47″N 10°13′58″E
- Country: Italy
- Region: Tuscany
- Province: Livorno (LI)
- Comune: Campo nell'Elba
- Elevation: 9 m (30 ft)

Population (2011)
  - Total: 405
- Time zone: UTC+1 (CET)
  - Summer (DST): UTC+2 (CEST)
- Postal code: 57034
- Dialing code: (+39) 0565

La Pila is a village in Tuscany, central Italy, administratively a frazione of the comune of Campo nell'Elba, province of Livorno. At the time of the 2011 census its population was 405.

La Pila is located on the Elba Island and it is about 3 km from the municipal seat of Marina di Campo.

== Airport ==
- Marina di Campo Airport

== Bibliography ==
- Ferruzzi, Silvestre (2010). Signum. Pisa.
