= Sant'Ilario =

Sant'Ilario may refer to:

- Sant'Ilario in Campo, a village in Tuscany, central Italy, a frazione of the comune of Campo nell'Elba, province of Livorno.
- Sant'Ilario d'Enza, a municipality in the Province of Reggio Emilia in the Italian region Emilia-Romagna.
- Sant'Ilario dello Ionio, a local municipality in the Province of Reggio Calabria in the Italian region Calabria
