= Silver Air (Czech Republic) =

| IATA | ICAO | Call sign |
|---|---|---|
| - | SLD | SILVERLINE |
- Founded: 1995
- Hubs: Budapest Ferenc Liszt Int. Marina di Campo Airport
- Fleet size: 2
- Destinations: 7 (5 passenger, 2 cargo)
- Headquarters: Prague, Czech Republic
- Website: silverair.cz

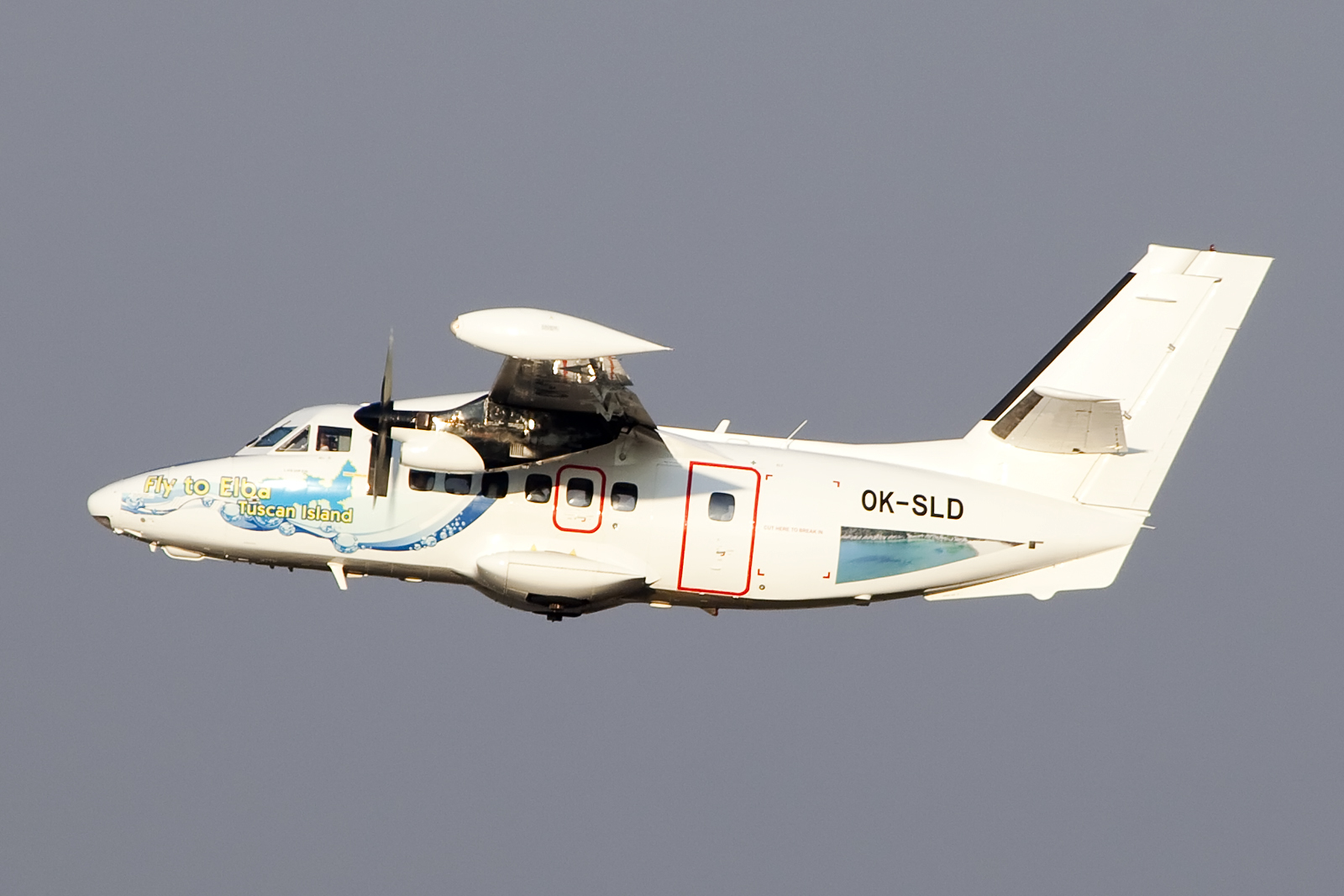
Silver Air Let L-410 Turbolet in "fly to Elba, Tuscan island" livery

Silver Air spol. s r.o. is a small Czech airline headquartered in Prague, offering both passenger and cargo services. It was established in 1995 and started flight operations in February 1997. Even though it is a Czech airline, passenger services are based at Marina di Campo Airport in Elba Island Italy and operated on behalf of local travel and/or tourism entities. Cargo services are exclusively located in Romania.

== Destinations ==
As of April 2022, Silver Air serves the following passenger destinations:

Italy

- Bologna – Bologna Guglielmo Marconi Airport seasonal'
- Florence – Florence-Peretola Airport
- Milan – Linate Airport seasonal
- Pisa – Pisa International Airport

Switzerland

- Lugano – Lugano Airport seasonal

Operations from and to Marina di Campo Airport are subject to yearly or even seasonally decisions of Tuscany regional government, Livorno province administration, Elba Island municipalities union. Silver Air has to just follow instructions coming from above and schedules may be retuned even at short notice.

=== Cargo ===
Romania

- Timișoara – Timișoara Traian Vuia International Airport
- Cluj-Napoca – Cluj International Airport

== Fleet ==
The Silver Air fleet includes the following aircraft (as of 10 September 2015):

- 2 Let L-410 Turbolet
