= Seccheto =

- Frazione
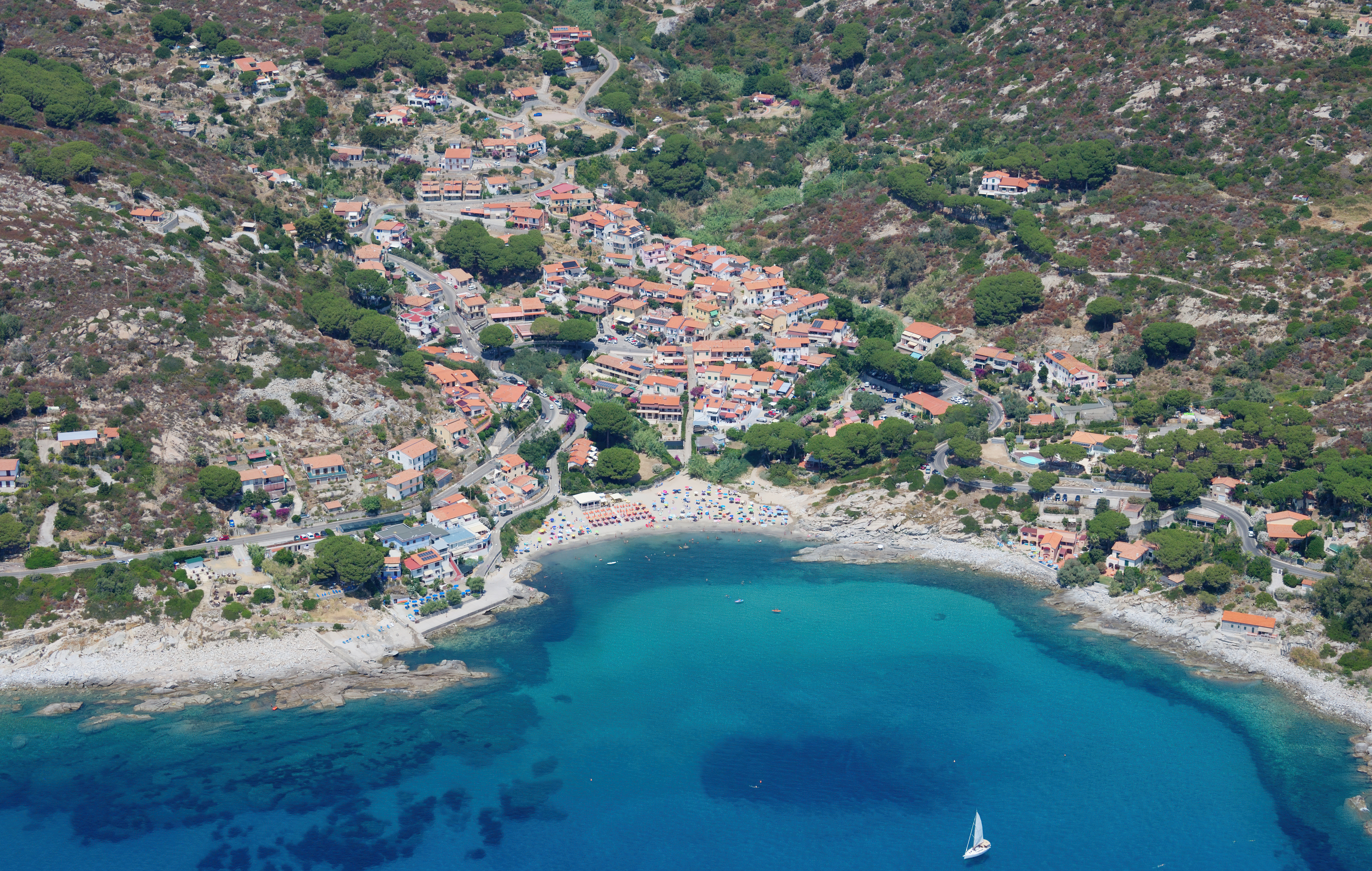

- Location of Seccheto in Italy
- Coordinates: 42°44′13″N 10°10′36″E
- Country: Italy
- Region: Tuscany
- Province: Livorno (LI)
- Comune: Campo nell'Elba
- Elevation: 3 m (9.8 ft)

Population (2011)
  - Total: 193
- Time zone: UTC+1 (CET)
  - Summer (DST): UTC+2 (CEST)
- Postal code: 57034
- Dialing code: (+39) 0565

Seccheto is a village in Tuscany, central Italy, administratively a frazione of the comune of Campo nell'Elba, province of Livorno. At the time of the 2011 census its population was 193.

Seccheto is located on the Elba Island and it is about 6 km from the municipal seat of Marina di Campo.

== Bibliography ==
- Guide d'Italia. Toscana. Milan: Touring Club Italiano. 2012. p. 464.
