= Pomonte =

Pomonte may refer to:

- Pomonte, Fara in Sabina, a village in the province of Rieti, Italy
- Pomonte, Gualdo Cattaneo, a village in the province of Perugia, Italy
- Pomonte, Marciana, a town in the province of Livorno, Italy
- Pomonte, Scansano, a village in the province of Grosseto, Italy
