= Patresi =

- Frazione
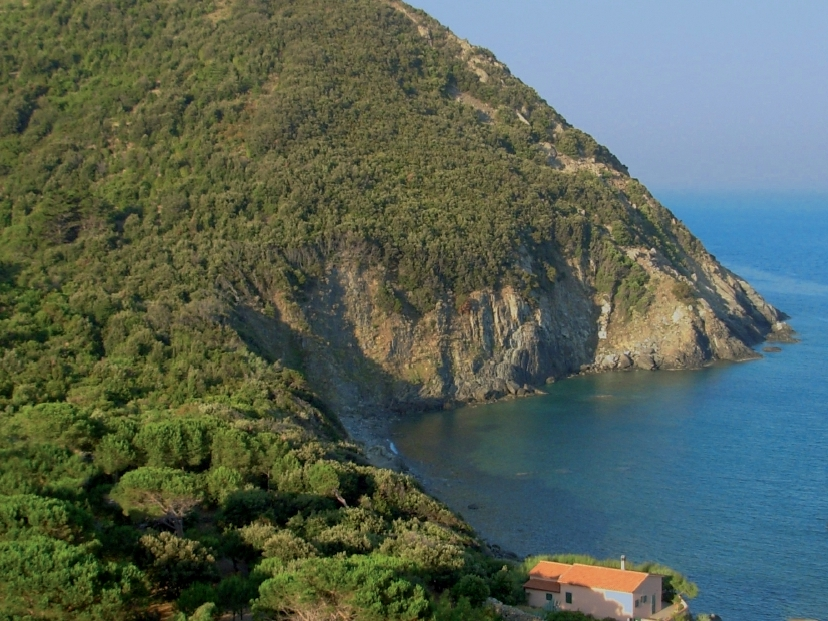

- Location of Patresi in Italy
- Coordinates: 42°47′38″N 10°7′5″E
- Country: Italy
- Region: Tuscany
- Province: Livorno (LI)
- Comune: Marciana
- Elevation: 127 m (417 ft)

Population (2011)
  - Total: 99
- Time zone: UTC+1 (CET)
  - Summer (DST): UTC+2 (CEST)
- Postal code: 57030
- Dialing code: (+39) 0565

Patresi is a village in Tuscany, central Italy, administratively a frazione of the comune of Marciana, province of Livorno. At the time of the 2011 census its population was 99.

Patresi is located on the Elba Island and it is about 4 km from Marciana.

== Bibliography ==
- Zecchini, Michelangelo (2001). Isola d'Elba. Le origini. Lucca.
