= Colle d'Orano =

- Frazione
- Location of Colle d'Orano in Italy
- Coordinates: 42°47′15″N 10°6′45″E
- Country: Italy
- Region: Tuscany
- Province: Livorno (LI)
- Comune: Marciana
- Elevation: 140 m (460 ft)

Population (2011)
  - Total: 92
- Time zone: UTC+1 (CET)
  - Summer (DST): UTC+2 (CEST)
- Postal code: 57030
- Dialing code: (+39) 0565

Colle d'Orano is a village in Tuscany, central Italy, administratively a frazione of the comune of Marciana, province of Livorno. At the time of the 2011 census its population was 92.

Colle d'Orano is located on the Elba Island and it is about 6 km from Marciana.

== Bibliography ==
- Zecchini, Michelangelo (2001). Isola d'Elba. Le origini. Lucca.
- Zecchini, Michelangelo (1971). L'archeologia nell'Arcipelago Toscano. Pisa.
