= Monte Poro Lighthouse =

Monte Poro
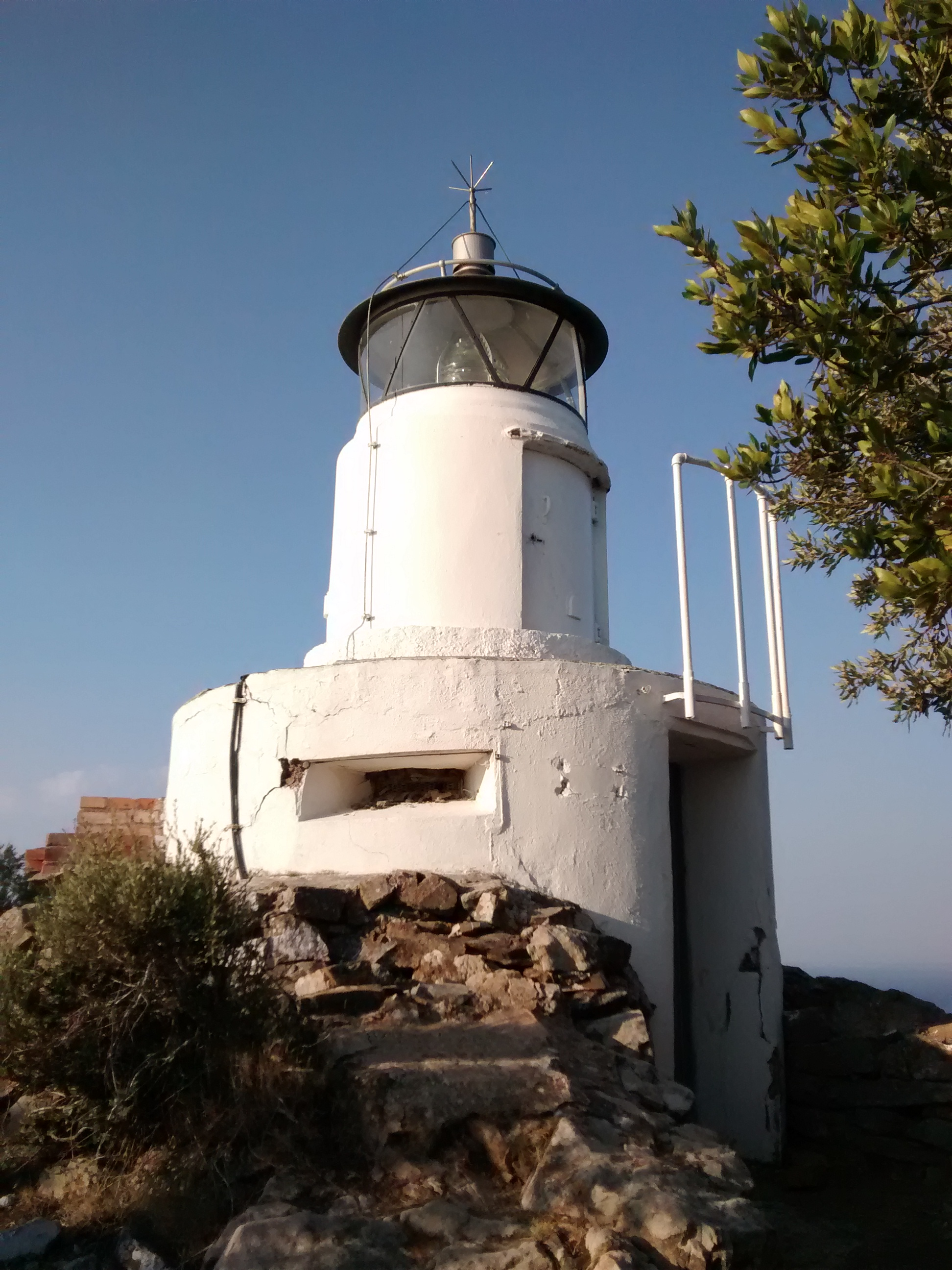
- Monte Poro Lighthouse
- Location: Marina di Campo; Elba; Italy
- Coordinates: 42°43′40″N 10°14′15″E

Tower
- Constructed: 1968
- Foundation: concrete base
- Construction: concrete tower
- Height: 2 metres (6.6 ft)
- Shape: cylindrical tower with lantern
- Markings: white tower, grey metallic lantern roof
- Power source: mains electricity
- Operator: Arcipelago Toscano National Park

Light
- Focal height: 160 metres (520 ft)
- Lens: Type OF 375; Focal length: 187,5 mm
- Intensity: main: MaxiHalo-60 EFF reserve: LABI 100 W
- Range: main: 16 nautical miles (30 km; 18 mi) reserve: 12 nautical miles (22 km; 14 mi)
- Characteristic: Fl W 5s.
- Italy no.: 2054 E.F.

Monte Poro Lighthouse (Italian: Faro di Monte Poro) is an active lighthouse located on the summit of Monte Poro, in the south western part of Elba on the Tyrrhenian Sea, a region covered by Macchia Mediterranea. The place was of some strategic interest during World War II because close to the lighthouse are the ruins of a German position.

== Description ==
The lighthouse, built in 1968, consists of a cylindrical squat tower, 2 metres (6.6 ft) high, with lantern. The tower is mounted on a cylindrical equipment building similar to a pillbox because provided with a stepped embrasure. The equipment building and the tower are white, the lantern roof is grey metallic.

The light is positioned at 160 metres (520 ft) above sea level and emits a white flash in a 5 seconds period, visible up to a distance of 16 nautical miles (30 km; 18 mi). The lighthouse is completely automated and managed by the Arcipelago Toscano National Park with the identification code number 2054 E.F.

== See also ==
- List of lighthouses in Italy
