= Chiessi =

- Frazione
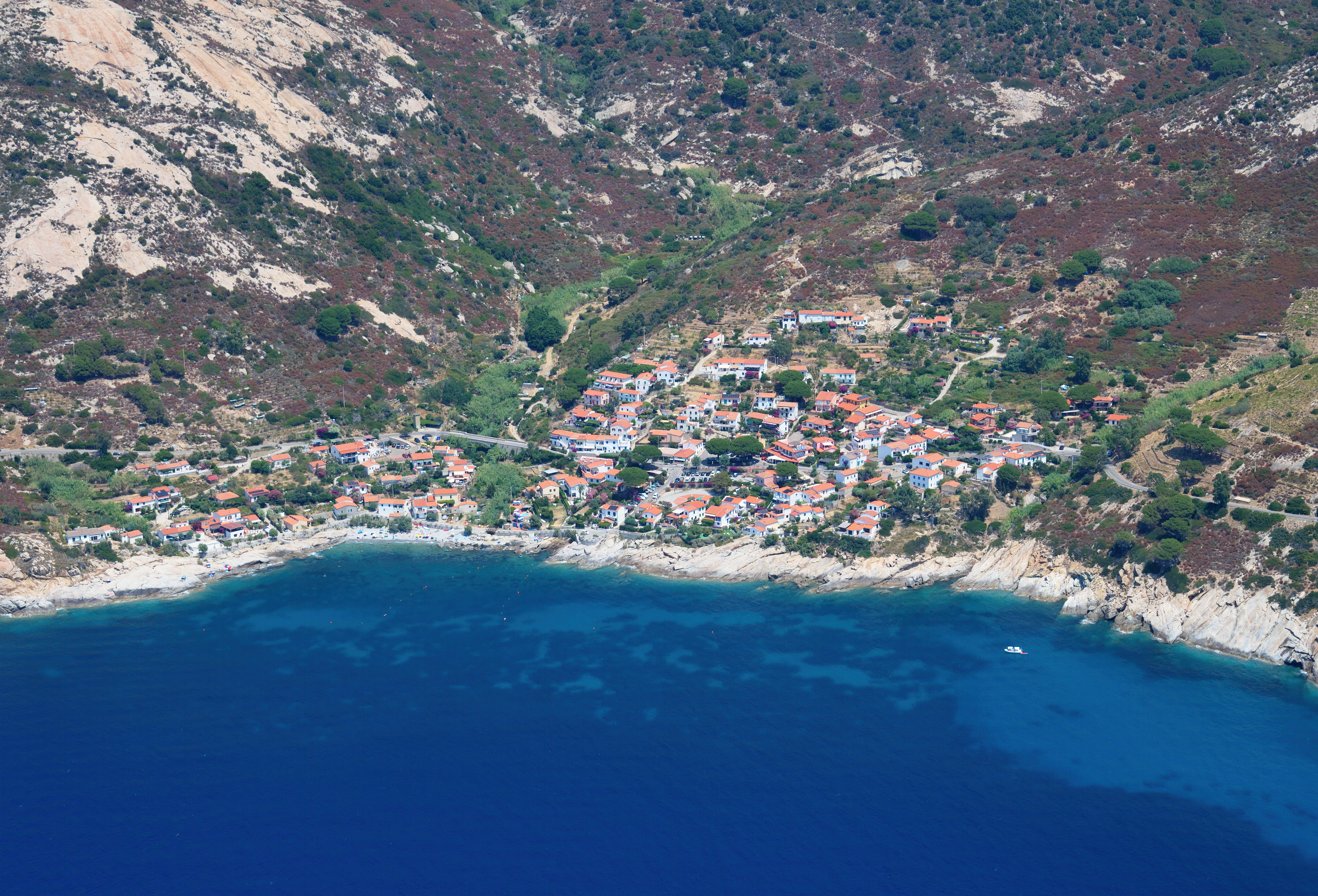
- Aerial view of Chiessi

- Location of Chiessi in Italy
- Coordinates: 42°45′32″N 10°6′39″E
- Country: Italy
- Region: Tuscany
- Province: Livorno (LI)
- Comune: Marciana
- Elevation: 22 m (72 ft)

Population (2011)
  - Total: 159
- Time zone: UTC+1 (CET)
  - Summer (DST): UTC+2 (CEST)
- Postal code: 57030
- Dialing code: (+39) 0565

Chiessi is a village in Tuscany, central Italy, administratively a frazione of the comune of Marciana, province of Livorno. At the time of the 2011 census its population was 159.

Chiessi is located on the Elba Island and it is about 8 km from Marciana.

== Bibliography ==
- Zecchini, Michelangelo (1982). Relitti romani dell'Isola d'Elba. Lucca: Fazzi.
- Zecchini, Michelangelo (1971). L'archeologia nell'Arcipelago Toscano. Pisa.
