= Zanca-Sant'Andrea =

- Frazione
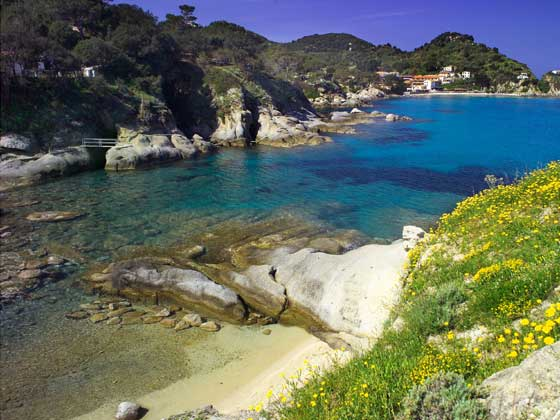

- Location of Zanca-Sant'Andrea in Italy
- Coordinates: 42°48′23″N 10°8′26″E
- Country: Italy
- Region: Tuscany
- Province: Livorno (LI)
- Comune: Marciana
- Elevation: 148 m (486 ft)

Population (2011)
  - Total: 188
- Time zone: UTC+1 (CET)
  - Summer (DST): UTC+2 (CEST)
- Postal code: 57030
- Dialing code: (+39) 0565

Zanca-Sant'Andrea is a village in Tuscany, central Italy, administratively a frazione of the comune of Marciana, province of Livorno. At the time of the 2011 census its population was 188.

The village is located on the Elba Island and includes the hamlets of Sant'Andrea and Zanca. It is about 6 km from Marciana.

== Bibliography ==
- Guide d'Italia. Toscana. Milano: Touring Club Italiano. 2012. p. 464.
- Zecchini, Michelangelo (2001). Isola d'Elba. Le origini. Lucca.
