= Sant'Ilario in Campo =

- Frazione
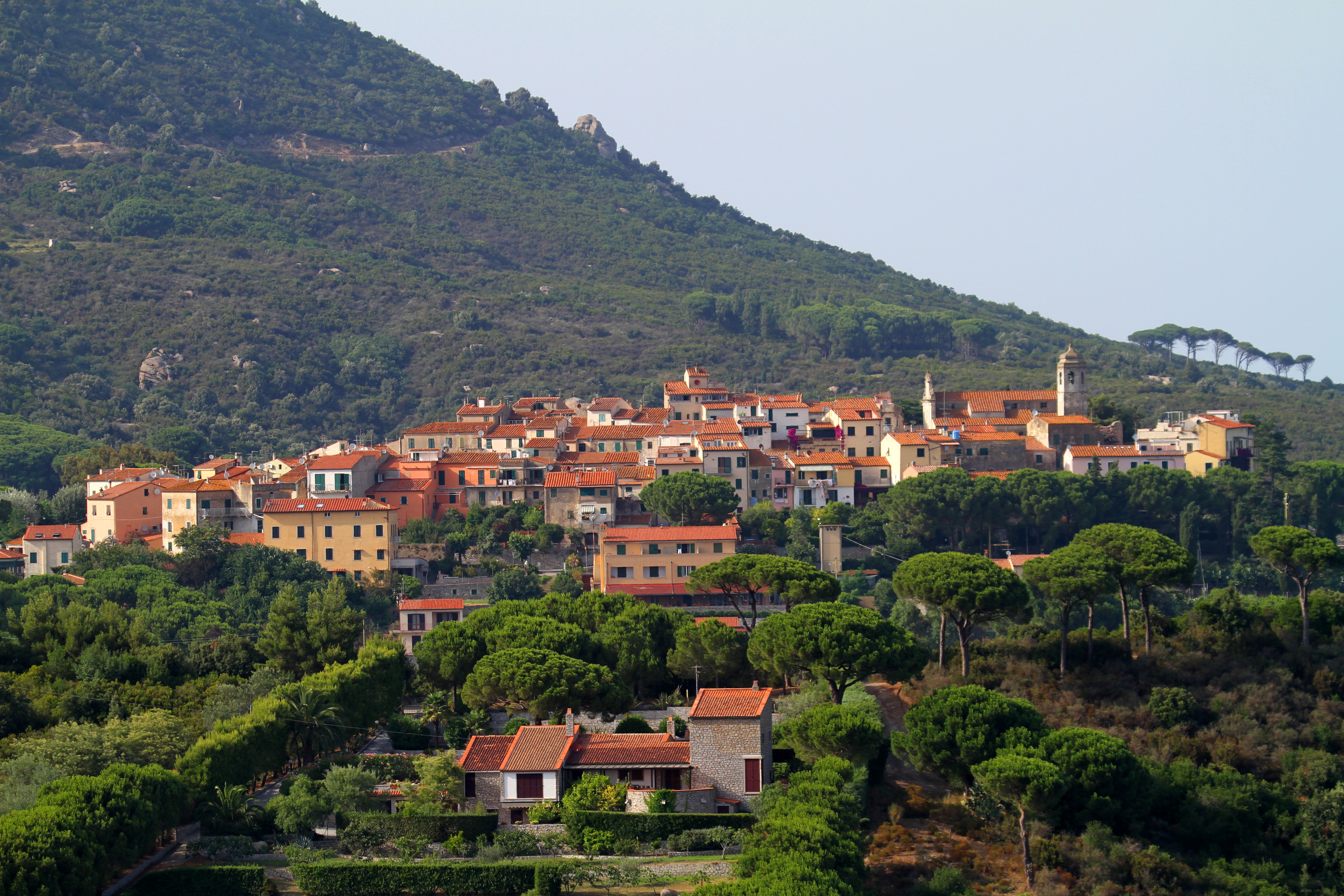
- View of Sant'Ilario in Campo

- Location of Sant'Ilario in Campo in Italy
- Coordinates: 42°45′50″N 10°12′51″E
- Country: Italy
- Region: Tuscany
- Province: Livorno (LI)
- Comune: Campo nell'Elba
- Elevation: 180 m (590 ft)

Population (2011)
  - Total: 157
- Time zone: UTC+1 (CET)
  - Summer (DST): UTC+2 (CEST)
- Postal code: 57034
- Dialing code: (+39) 0565

Sant'Ilario in Campo is a village in Tuscany, central Italy, administratively a frazione of the comune of Campo nell'Elba, province of Livorno. At the time of the 2011 census its population was 157.

Sant'Ilario is located on the Elba Island and it is about 5 km from the municipal seat of Marina di Campo.

== Bibliography ==
- Emanuele Repetti (1841). "Sant'Ilario in Campo". Dizionario Geografico Fisico Storico della Toscana. Florence. Archived from the original on 2015-09-23.
