= Procchio =

- Frazione
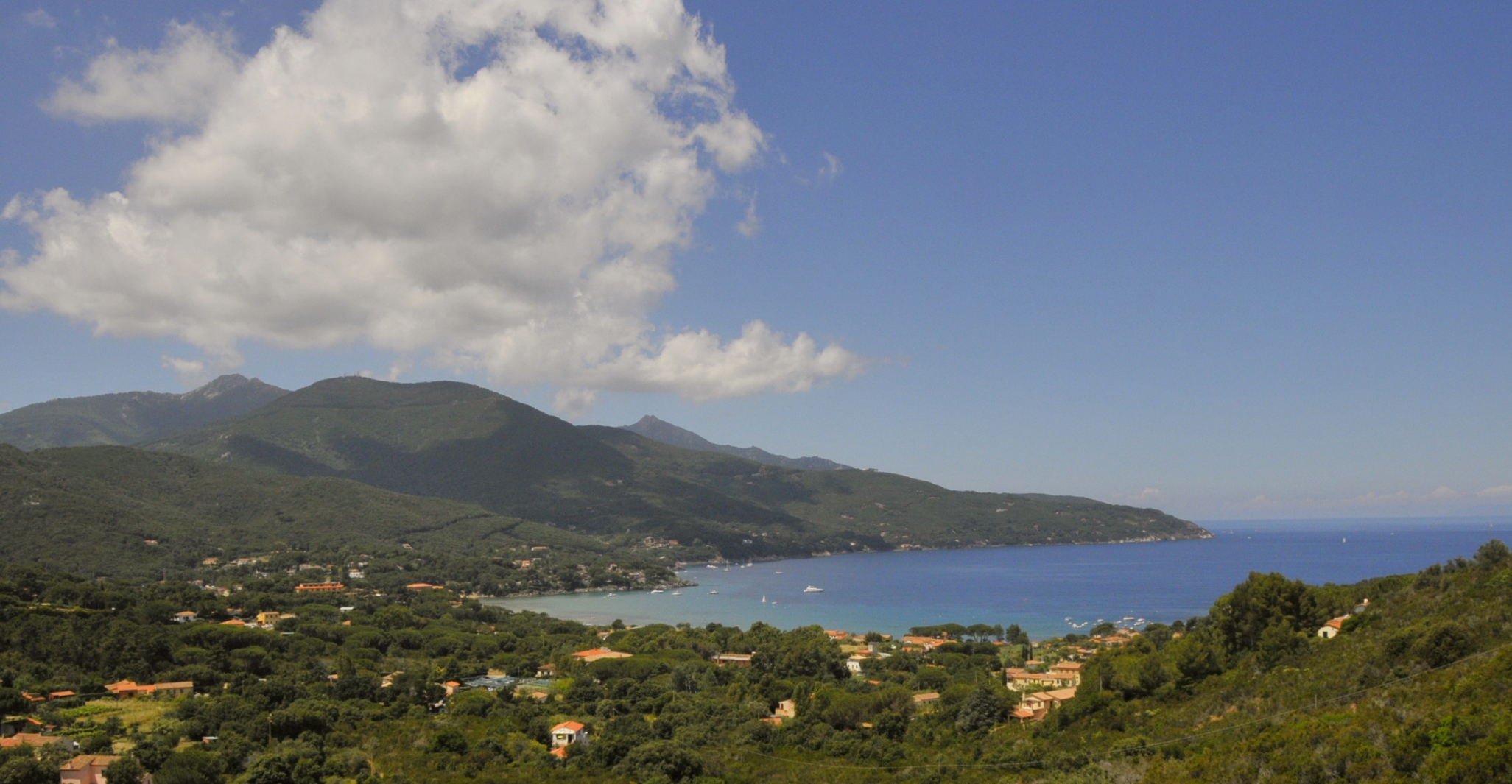
- View of Procchio

- Location of Procchio in Italy
- Coordinates: 42°47′9″N 10°14′39″E
- Country: Italy
- Region: Tuscany
- Province: Livorno (LI)
- Comune: Marciana
- Elevation: 6 m (20 ft)

Population (2011)
  - Total: 441
- Time zone: UTC+1 (CET)
  - Summer (DST): UTC+2 (CEST)
- Postal code: 57030
- Dialing code: (+39) 0565

Procchio is a village in Tuscany, central Italy, administratively a frazione of the comune of Marciana, province of Livorno. At the time of the 2011 census its population was 441.

Procchio is located on the island of Elba, and it is about 10 km from Marciana.

== Bibliography ==
- Zecchini, Michelangelo (2001). Isola d'Elba. Le origini. Lucca.
- Zecchini, Michelangelo (1971). L'archeologia nell'Arcipelago Toscano. Pisa.
