= Pomonte, Marciana =

Pomonte
- Frazione
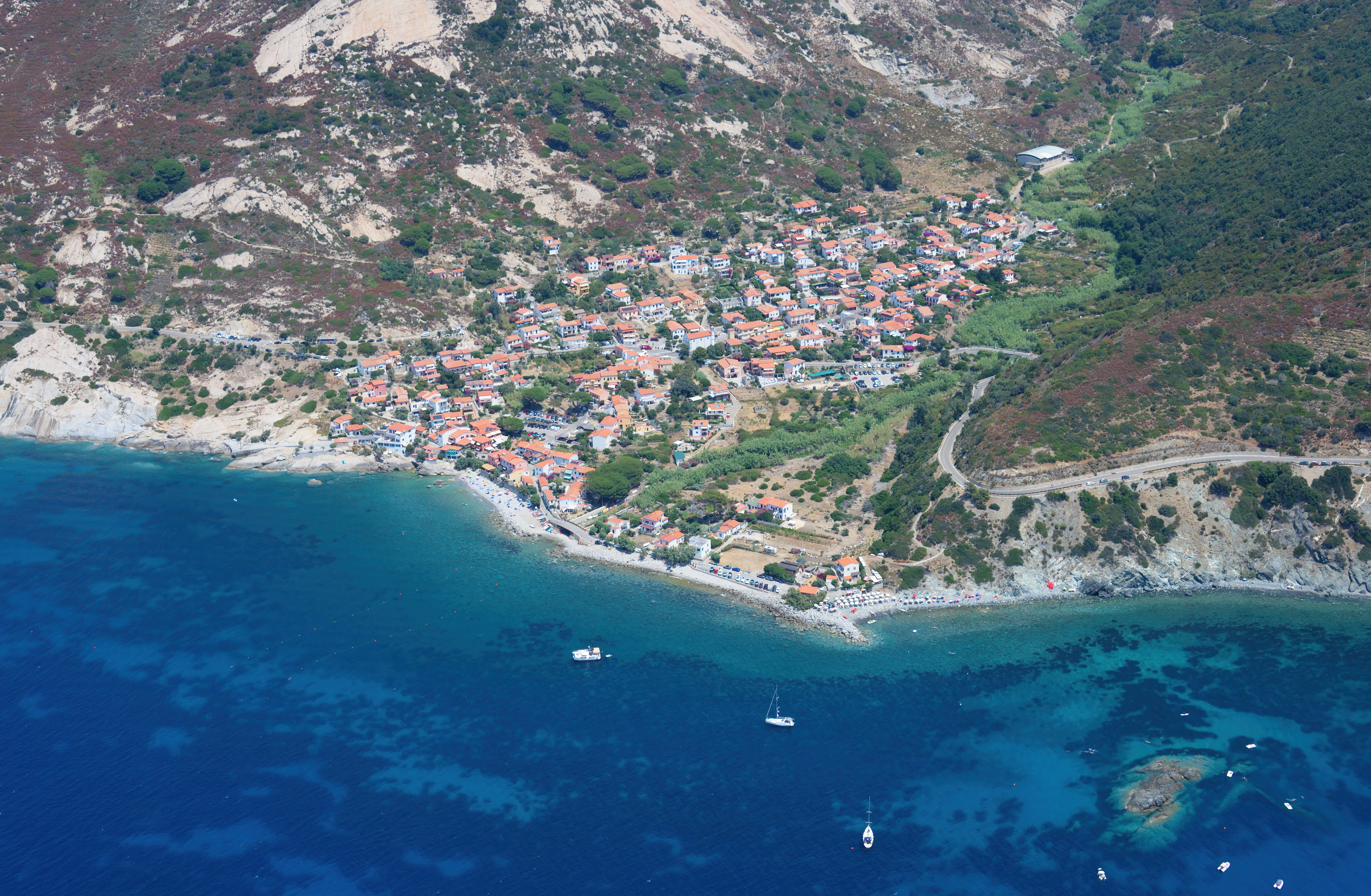
- Aerial view of Pomonte

- Location of Pomonte in Italy
- Coordinates: 42°44′56″N 10°7′8″E
- Country: Italy
- Region: Tuscany
- Province: Livorno (LI)
- Comune: Marciana
- Elevation: 20 m (66 ft)

Population (2011)
  - Total: 299
- Time zone: UTC+1 (CET)
  - Summer (DST): UTC+2 (CEST)
- Postal code: 57030
- Dialing code: (+39) 0565

Pomonte is a village in Tuscany, central Italy, administratively a frazione of the comune of Marciana, province of Livorno. At the time of the 2011 census its population was 299.

Pomonte is located on the Elba Island and it is about 8 km from Marciana.

== Bibliography ==
- Ferruzzi, Silvestre (2013). Pedemonte e Montemarsale. Pontedera.
- Zecchini, Michelangelo (2001). Isola d'Elba. Le origini. Lucca.
- Zecchini, Michelangelo (1971). L'archeologia nell'Arcipelago Toscano. Pisa.
