= Poggio, Marciana =

Poggio
- Frazione
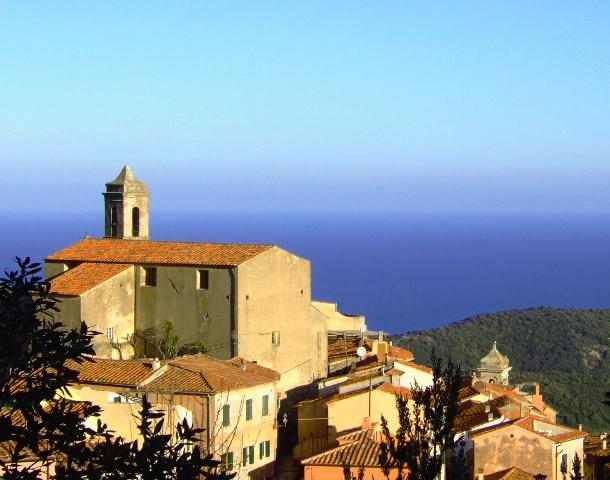
- View of Poggio

- Location of Poggio in Italy
- Coordinates: 42°47′15″N 10°10′59″E
- Country: Italy
- Region: Tuscany
- Province: Livorno (LI)
- Comune: Marciana
- Elevation: 330 m (1,080 ft)

Population (2011)
  - Total: 241
- Time zone: UTC+1 (CET)
  - Summer (DST): UTC+2 (CEST)
- Postal code: 57030
- Dialing code: (+39) 0565

Poggio is a village in Tuscany, central Italy, administratively a frazione of the comune of Marciana, province of Livorno. At the time of the 2011 census its population was 241.

Poggio is located on the Elba Island and it is about 3 km from Marciana.

== Bibliography ==
- Ferruzzi, Silvestre (1990). Jovis Giove Podium Poggio. Asti.
- Zecchini, Michelangelo (2001). Isola d'Elba. Le origini. Lucca.
- Zecchini, Michelangelo (1971). L'archeologia nell'Arcipelago Toscano. Pisa.
