= Marina di Campo Airport =

Marina di Campo Airport Aeroporto di Marina di Campo
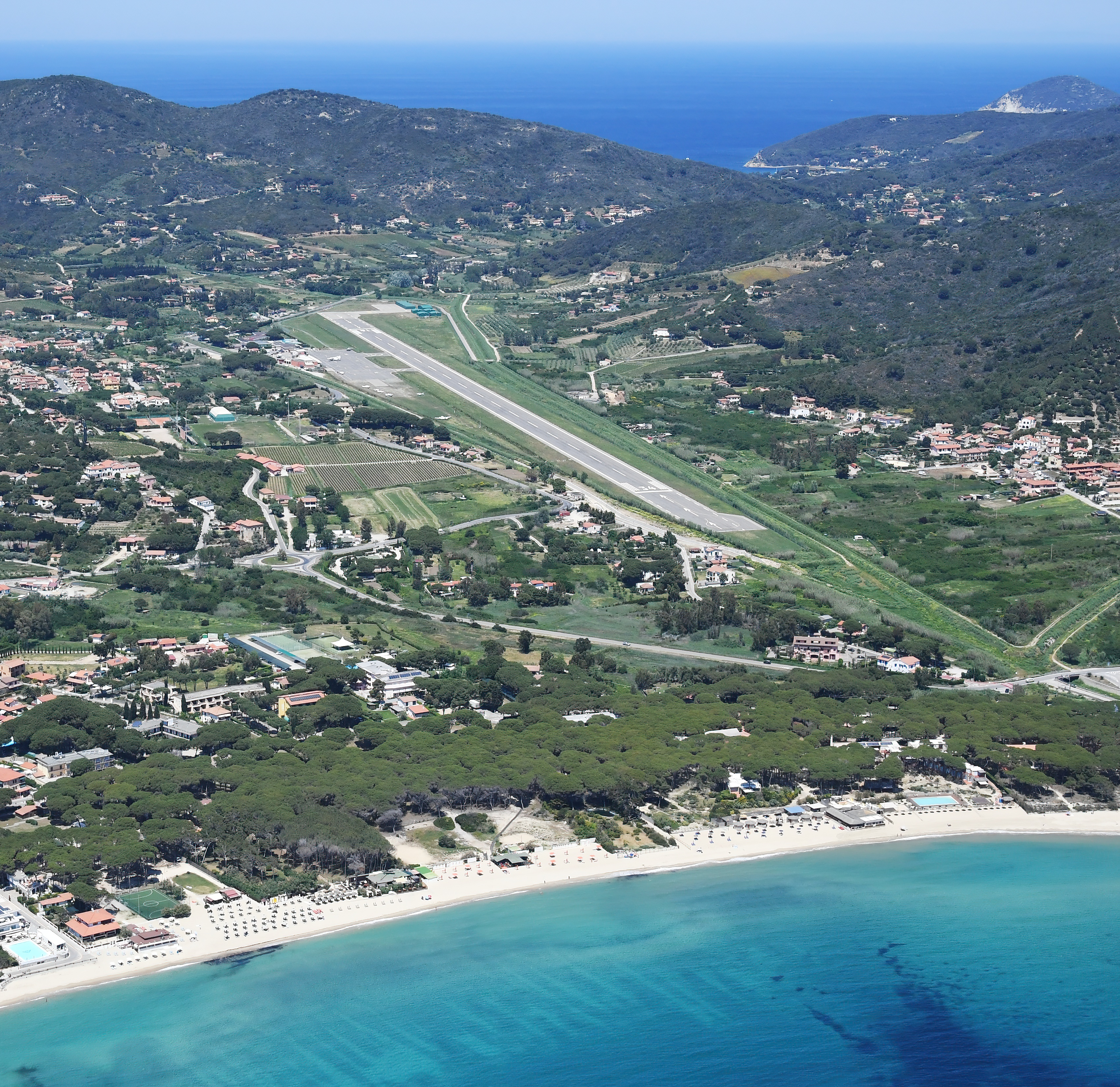
- IATA: EBA; ICAO: LIRJ

Summary
- Airport type: Public / Military
- Operator: Alatoscana S.p.A.
- Serves: Marina di Campo
- Location: Elba, Italy
- Elevation AMSL: 30 ft (9.1 m)
- Coordinates: 42°45′37″N 010°14′22″E
- Website: elba-airport.it

Map
- Location within Tuscany Location within Italy

Runways
Direction	Length		Surface
Direction	m	ft	Surface
16/34	949	3,114	Asphalt

Marina di Campo Airport (Italian: Aeroporto di Marina di Campo) (IATA: EBA, ICAO: LIRJ) is the airport of the Italian island of Elba, located in the village of La Pila, in Marina di Campo. It is also known as Teseo Tesei Airport (Italian: Aeroporto "Teseo Tesei"). It is the third airport of Tuscany in terms of passengers after Pisa International Airport and Florence Airport. The airport served until 31 October 2023 as a focus city of Silver Air which was the only airline operating regularly from the airport.

== History ==
Opened as a grass airstrip in 1963, the airport was taken over by Milan-based company Transair in 1966 and was developed to handle commercial traffic, with regional airline Transavio flying Britten-Norman Islanders and Piaggio P.166 aircraft to Pisa, Milan and Florence, although a tarmac runway was not opened until 1991. Transavio folded in 1990, but several other regional airlines including InterSky, Silver Air and Air Alps started operations in the following years. A new terminal was opened in 2013, with the old building remaining as a cafeteria, shopping centre and offices.

== Airlines and destinations ==
The following airlines offers scheduled services from and to Marina di Campo:

Airlines	Destinations
Air Mountain	Seasonal charter: Sion
Private Wings	Seasonal charter: Bern St. Gallen/Altenrhein, Zurich
Small Fly Airlines	Florence, Pisa; Seasonal: Milan–Linate
