= Marciana =

- Comune
- Comune di Marciana
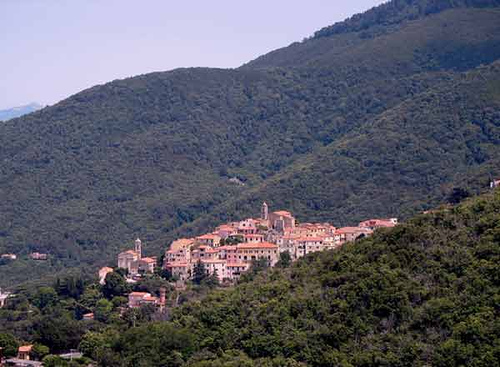
- View of Marciana

- Location within Italy Location within Tuscany
- Coordinates: 42°47′N 10°10′E
- Country: Italy
- Region: Tuscany
- Province: Livorno (LI)
- Frazioni: Chiessi, Colle d'Orano, Patresi, Poggio, Pomonte, Procchio, Zanca-Sant'Andrea

Government
  - Mayor: Anna Bulgaresi

Area
  - Total: 45.45 km^{2} (17.55 sq mi)
- Elevation: 375 m (1,230 ft)

Population (2026)
  - Total: 2,049
  - Density: 45.08/km^{2} (116.8/sq mi)
- Demonym: Marcianesi
- Time zone: UTC+1 (CET)
  - Summer (DST): UTC+2 (CEST)
- Postal code: 57030
- Dialing code: 0565
- Patron saint: St. Catherine of Alexandria
- Saint day: November 25
- Website: Official website

Marciana is a town and comune (municipality) on the island of Elba, in the Province of Livorno in the region of Tuscany in Italy. It has 2,049 inhabitants.

Marciana borders the municipalities of Campo nell'Elba, Marciana Marina, and Portoferraio.

== Demographics ==
As of 2026, the population is 2,049, of which 48.7% are male, and 51.3% are female. Minors make up 10.4% of the population, and seniors make up 32.3%.

Historical population

Year	Pop.	±%
1861	2,583	—
1871	2,440	−5.5%
1881	2,273	−6.8%
1901	2,275	+0.1%
1911	2,273	−0.1%
1921	2,445	+7.6%
1931	2,483	+1.6%
1936	2,495	+0.5%

Year	Pop.	±%
1951	2,309	−7.5%
1961	2,191	−5.1%
1971	2,186	−0.2%
1981	2,305	+5.4%
1991	2,244	−2.6%
2001	2,162	−3.7%
2011	2,208	+2.1%
2021	2,030	−8.1%

Source: ISTAT

=== Immigration ===
As of 2025, immigrants make up 10.3% of the population. The 5 largest foreign countries of birth are Romania, Moldova, Germany, Brazil, and Morocco.
