= Pisa International Airport =

International airport serving Pisa, Italy

Pisa International Airport Aeroporto Internazionale di Pisa

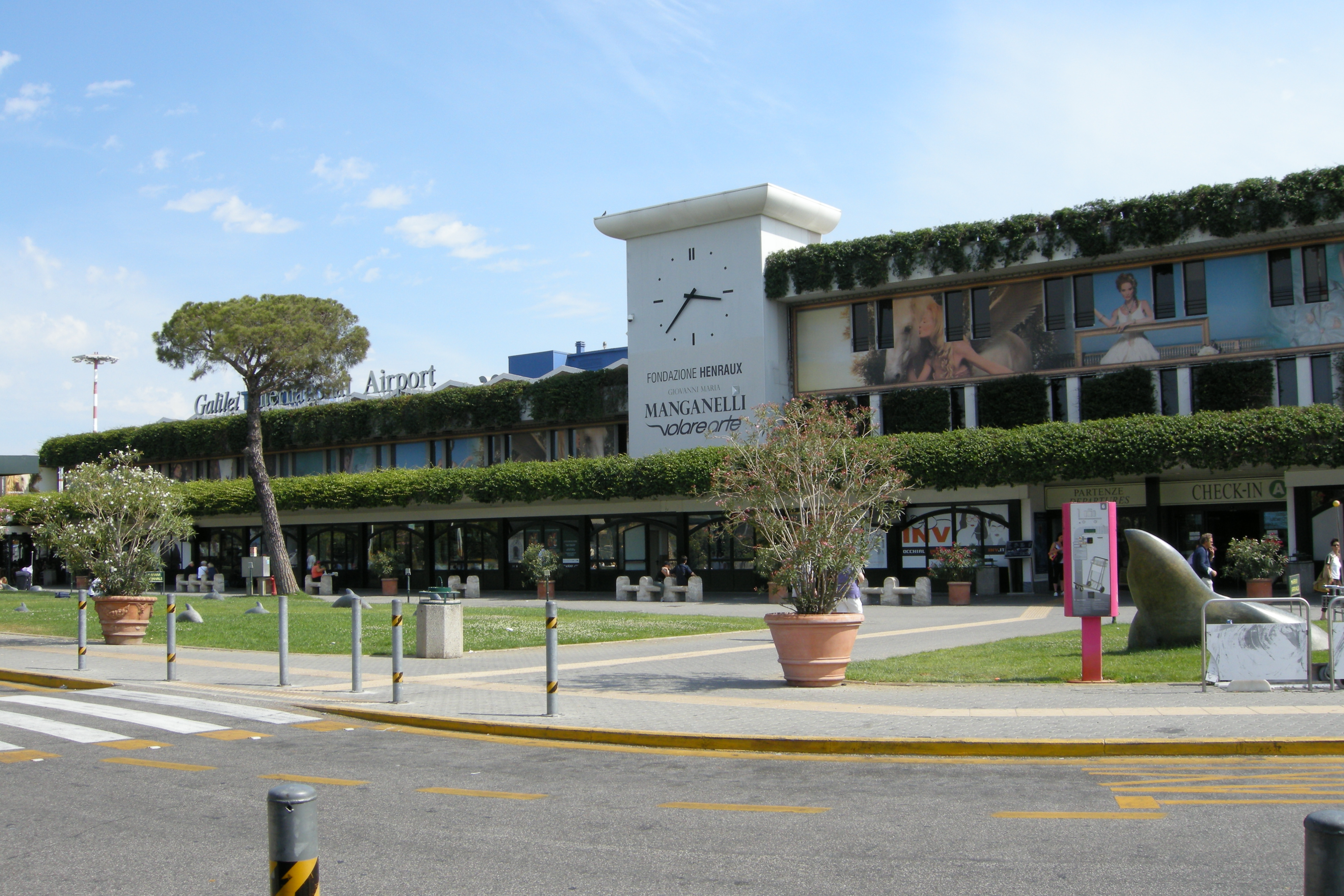
- IATA: PSA; ICAO: LIRP

Summary
- Airport type: Public / Military
- Operator: Aeronautica Militare Italiana / Toscana Aeroporti S.p.A.
- Serves: Pisa, Italy
- Focus city for: Ryanair
- Elevation AMSL: 6 ft (1.8 m)
- Coordinates: 43°41′02″N 010°23′33″E
- Website: pisa-airport.it

Map
- Location in Italy PSA (Italy)

Runways
Direction	Length		Surface
Direction	m	ft	Surface
03R/21L	2,993	9,819	Asphalt
03L/21R	2,792	9,160	Asphalt

Statistics (2024)
- Passengers: 5,547,008
- Passenger change 23–24: ▲8.6%
- Aircraft movements: 41,819
- Movements change 23–24: ▲4.9%
- Cargo (tons): 12,967
- Cargo change 23–24: ▲1.3%
- Source: Italian AIP at EUROCONTROL; Statistics from Assaeroporti

Pisa International Airport (IATA: PSA, ICAO: LIRP) — also named Galileo Galilei Airport — is an international airport located in Pisa, Italy. It is one of the two major airports in Tuscany, the other being Florence Airport. Pisa is ranked 10th in Italy in terms of passenger numbers. It is named after Galileo Galilei, the scientist and native of Pisa. The airport was first developed for the military in the 1930s and 1940s. The airport was used by 5,233,118 passengers in 2017. It serves as a focus city of Ryanair.

== History ==
During the end of World War II the airport was used as a base for the 15th Air Force of the United States Army Air Forces.

Delta Air Lines commenced direct flights to New York in June 2007. The route ended in 2016.

== Facilities ==
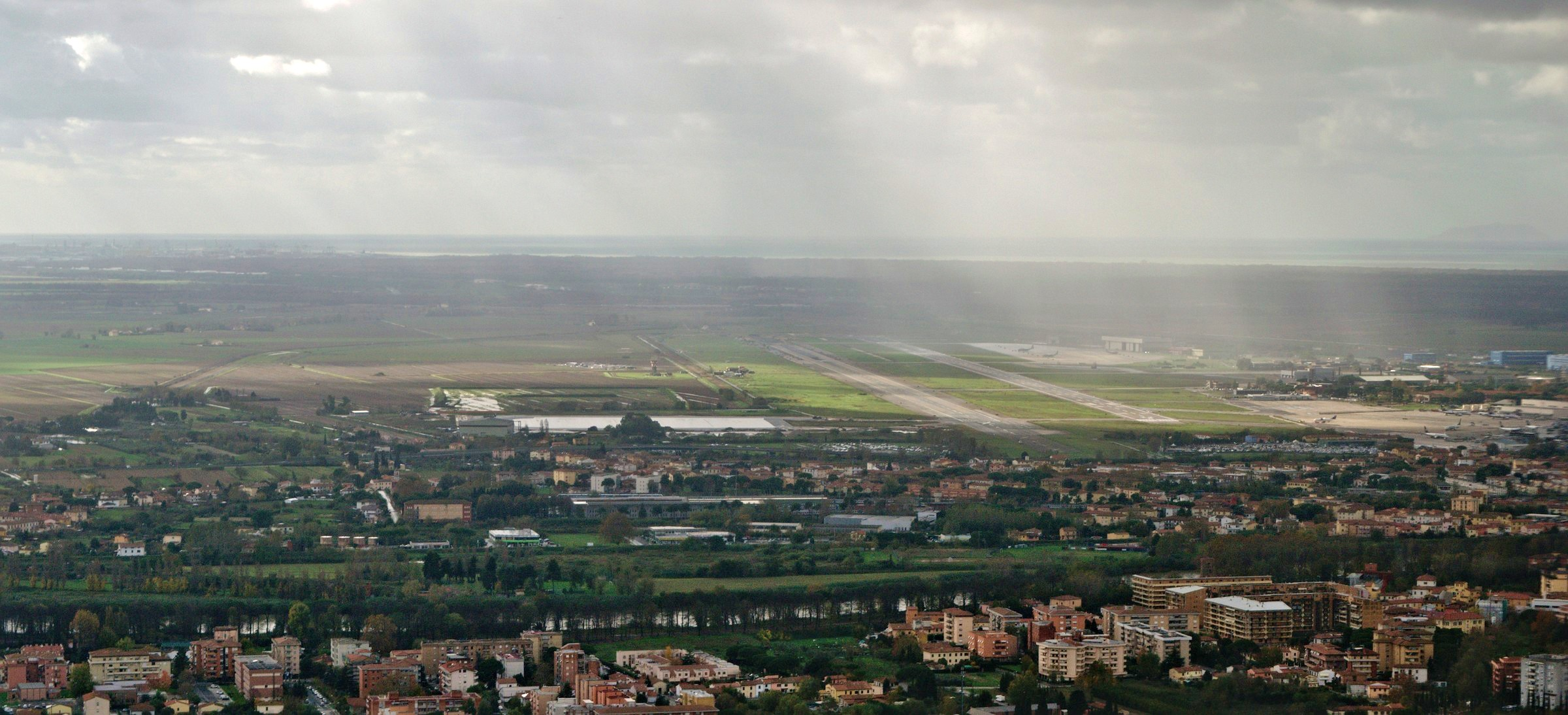
Aerial view

The airport is at an elevation of 6 feet (2 m) above mean sea level. It has two asphalt-paved runways: 04R/22L measuring 3,002 by 45 metres (9,849 ft × 148 ft) and 04L/22R measuring 2,793 by 43 metres (9,163 ft × 141 ft).

The terminal building has 16 gates (numbered 01–11 and 21–25), one of which (Gate 23) is equipped with a jetbridge; however, this is used by few airlines only. Gates 1–11 are on the ground floor and are for Schengen flights. Shuttle buses are used to take passengers to the plane. Gates 21–25 are non-Schengen and are on level one. Walk-boarding, bus-boarding and boarding by jetway are used here.

Besides civilian operations, the airport is also used extensively by the Aeronautica Militare (Italian Air Force) and is a base for, amongst others, the C-130 Hercules and C-27J Spartan transport aircraft. The airport is home to 46ª Brigata Aerea Silvio Angelucci (46th Air Brigade).

== Airlines and destinations ==
The following airlines operate regular scheduled and charter flights at Pisa Airport:

Airlines	Destinations
Aegean Airlines	Seasonal: Athens
Aeroitalia	Seasonal: Cagliari, Comiso
Air Arabia	Casablanca
Air Dolomiti	Seasonal: Frankfurt
AirBaltic	Seasonal: Riga
British Airways	London–Heathrow
easyJet	Bristol, London–Gatwick, London–Luton, Manchester, Paris–Orly; Seasonal: Berlin, Glasgow, London–Southend
Eurowings	Seasonal: Cologne–Bonn
Flydubai	Dubai–International
Jet2.com	Seasonal: Birmingham, Leeds/Bradford, Manchester
Norwegian Air Shuttle	Seasonal: Copenhagen, Helsinki, Oslo, Stockholm–Arlanda
Ryanair	Alghero, Amman–Queen Alia, Bari, Berlin, Birmingham, Bratislava, Brindisi, Brussels-Charleroi, Bucharest–Otopeni, Budapest, Cagliari, Catania, Copenhagen, Cork, Dublin, Eindhoven, Fuerteventura, Girona, Kraków, Lamezia Terme, London–Stansted, Madrid, Málaga, Malta, Manchester, Marrakesh, Palermo, Palma de Mallorca, Paris-Beauvais, Porto, Prague, Rabat, Reggio Calabria, Seville, Sofia, Tirana, Trapani, Valencia, Warsaw–Chopin, Wrocław; Seasonal: Brussels, Chania, Corfu, Edinburgh, Gdańsk, Glasgow–Prestwick, Gothenburg, Gran Canaria, Ibiza, Kaunas, Kefalonia, Kos, Lisbon, Memmingen, Rhodes, Sandefjord, Skiathos, Stockholm–Arlanda, Zadar
Scandinavian Airlines	Seasonal: Copenhagen, Oslo
Small Fly Airlines	Elba
Transavia	Amsterdam; Seasonal: Paris–Orly
Volotea	Toulouse (resumes 6 November 2026); Seasonal: Nantes, Olbia
Wizz Air	Bucharest–Otopeni, Iași, Palermo (begins 25 October 2026), Tirana, Warsaw–Chopin, Madrid (begins 3 November 2026); Seasonal: Belgrade

== Statistics ==
In 2006 and 2007, the airport was the fastest growing among Italy's top 15 airports, with passenger numbers up 30% in 2006 and 24% in 2007. In 2008 it was Italy's 11th-busiest airport, handling 3,963,717 and 4,011,525 passengers in 2010. In 2011 the growth rose to 11.3% and the airport carried 4,526,723 passengers.

== Ground transport ==
Since 2017 the airport has its own Pisa Mover shuttle service to and from Pisa Centrale railway station. A return ticket costs ten euros and the shuttle takes five minutes. The airport also has five passenger and one coach parking areas. Flibco coach operator offer regular shuttle services between Pisa International Airport and Florence city centre, making use of clearly marked bus stops outside the terminal with multiple daily departures, online ticketing and flexible rebooking options.

== Accidents and incidents ==
- On 27 January 1952, Seaboard & Western Airlines Douglas C-54A-5-DO overshot the runway on landing. Fire consumed the aircraft. The plane was carrying 50 cows, 47 of which were killed.
- On 23 November 2009, Italian Air Force Lockheed KC-130J Hercules MM62176 of the based 46 Aerobrigata crashed just after take-off. All five crew members were killed.

== See also ==
- Pisa Aeroporto railway station
- Florence Airport, Peretola – the second Tuscan international airport
- Marina di Campo Airport – another Tuscan airport
