= Marina di Campo =

- Frazione
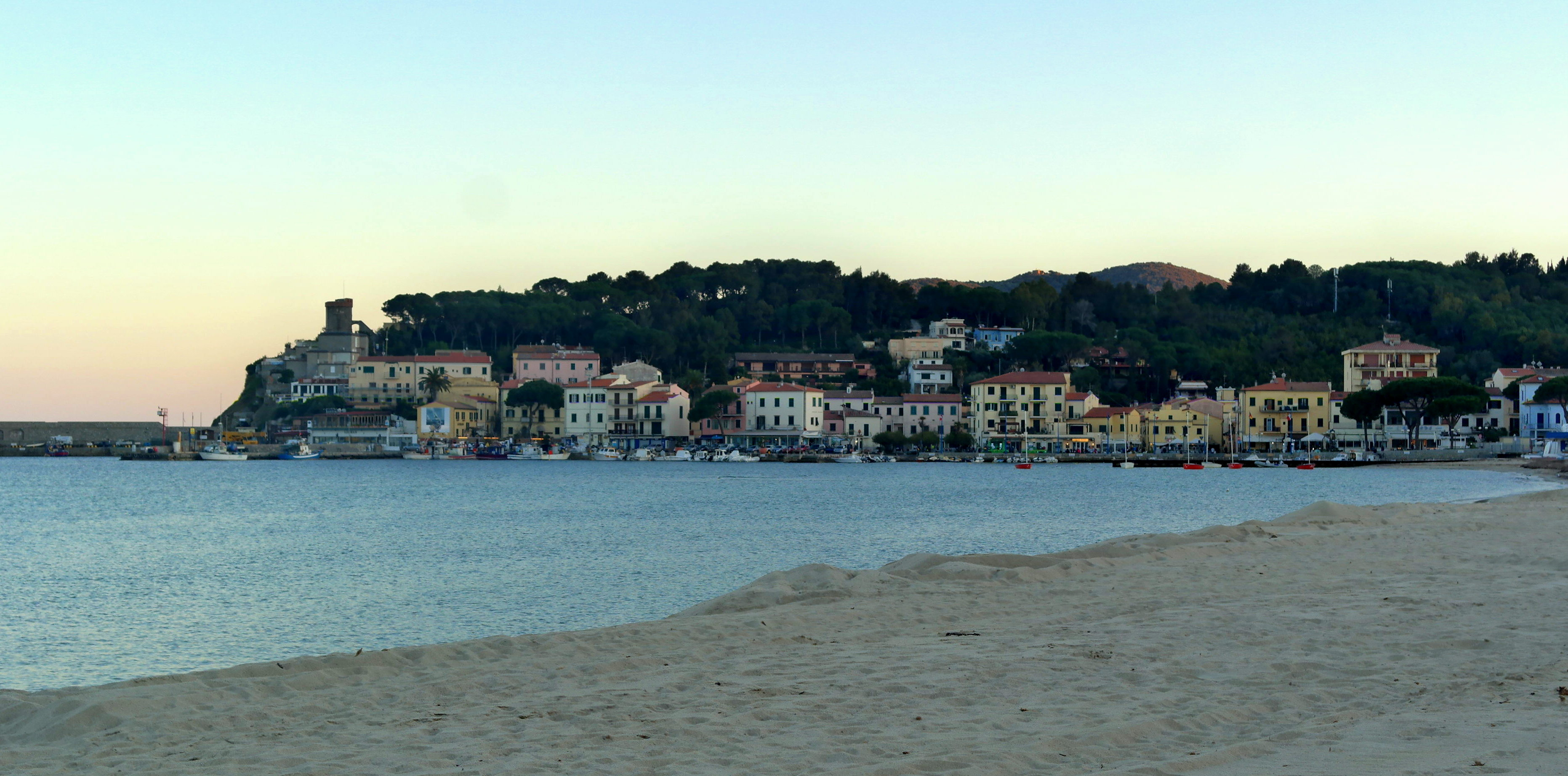
- View of Marina di Campo

- Location of Marina di Campo in Italy
- Coordinates: 42°47′15″N 10°10′59″E
- Country: Italy
- Region: Tuscany
- Province: Livorno (LI)
- Comune: Campo nell'Elba
- Elevation: 2 m (6.6 ft)

Population (2011)
  - Total: 2,104
- Time zone: UTC+1 (CET)
  - Summer (DST): UTC+2 (CEST)
- Postal code: 57034
- Dialing code: (+39) 0565

Marina di Campo is a town in Tuscany, central Italy, administratively a frazione of the comune of Campo nell'Elba, province of Livorno. At the time of the 2011 census its population was 2,104.

Marina di Campo is the main town and municipal seat of the municipality of Campo nell'Elba, on the Elba Island.

== Bibliography ==
- Emanuele Repetti (1835). "Torre di Campo-Campo-Golfo di Campo". Dizionario Geografico Fisico Storico della Toscana. Florence. Archived from the original on 2016-08-06.
- Guide d'Italia. Toscana. Milan: Touring Club Italiano. 2012. p. 464.
