= Ghent government in exile =

Louis XVIII's government-in-exile during the Hundred Days

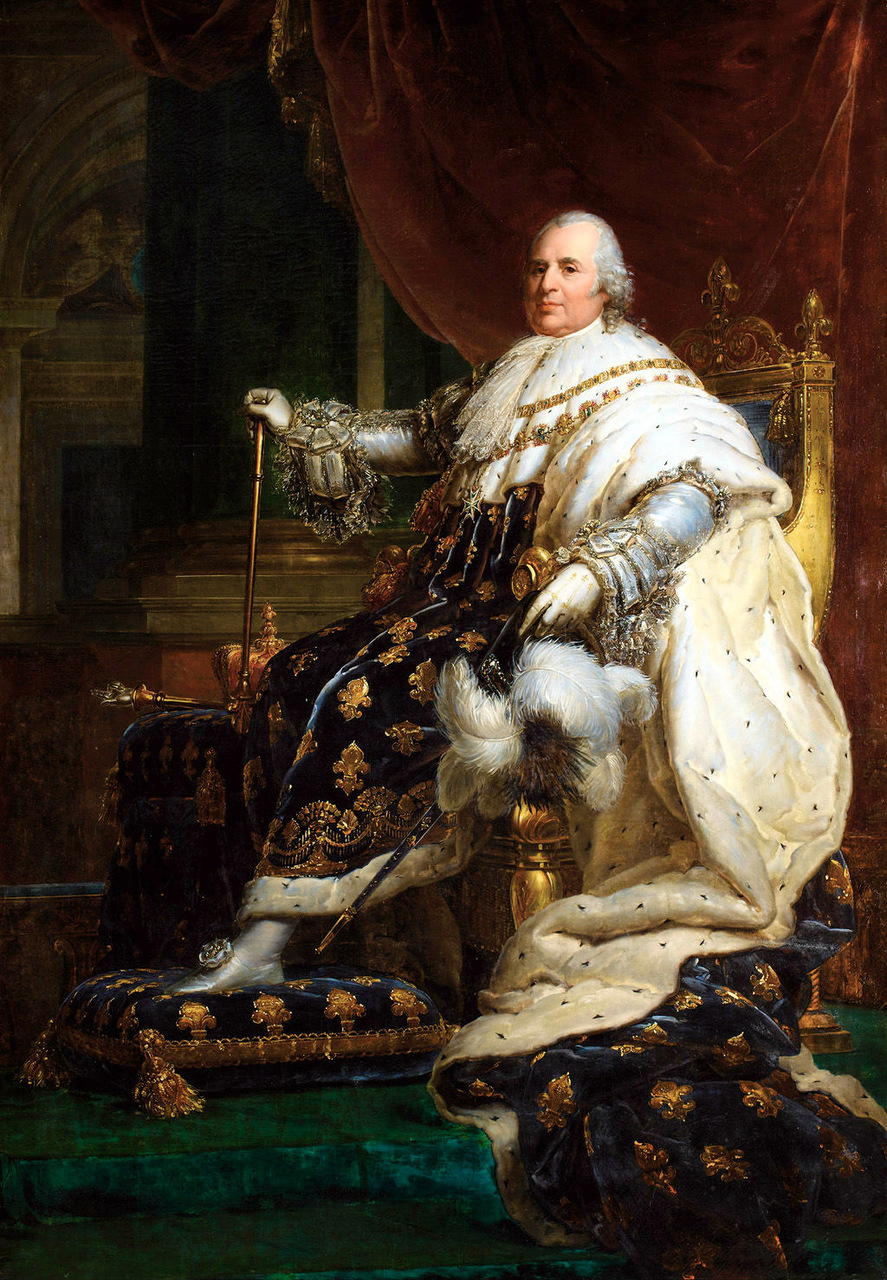
Portrait of Louis XVIII by François Gérard, 1814. Louis XVIII was forced to flee by Napoleon. He was eventually restored to the throne by Talleyrand and Fouché, and by the foreign powers who defeated Napoleon at Waterloo, forcing the latter into exile.

The Ghent government was Louis XVIII's government-in-exile during the Hundred Days. As Napoleon I rallied his forces and headed for Paris, the sovereign made some clumsy decisions. He deprived himself of national and international support, believing himself capable of restoring the situation. Louis XVIII finally reached an impasse by calling for the defense of the charter, refusing the intervention of foreign armies, and demanding loyalty from his army, which was largely loyal to Napoleonic memory. The king left Paris on March 19, 1815, and crossed the French borders on March 23, 1815, to settle in Ghent.

The government was made up of ministers who had followed him into exile, including Blacas, Beugnot, and Jaucourt. Others who remained loyal to the sovereign held ministerial posts, such as Chateaubriand, whom the sovereign disliked. In practice, this government had no real power, as it was located outside France's borders and closely watched by the Allied powers, who doubted the Bourbons would return. Despite this, Louis XVIII still believed in his destiny as king: he created a newspaper to rival the Moniteur universel and encouraged the Chouannerie to destabilize Napoleon's power. During its few months of existence, the Ghent government was the seat of rivalries within the sovereign's entourage. The ultraroyalist fringe hardened its positions, while constitutionalists like Guizot tried to influence the sovereign.

Napoleon's defeat at Waterloo on June 18, 1815, allowed Louis XVIII to consider a return to power. The foreign powers, convinced by Talleyrand, spoke out in his favor. In France, Fouché persuaded the chambers of the King's legitimacy to negotiate a peace treaty in a monarchical Europe. Louis XVIII returned to France on June 25, 1815, finally arriving in Paris on July 8, 1815. This return, marred by the excesses of the ultra-royalists, saw the start of the Second Restoration and the return of the Bourbons to the French throne until 1830.

== Napoleon's return and Bourbon worries ==
=== Part of the population in favor of the return ===
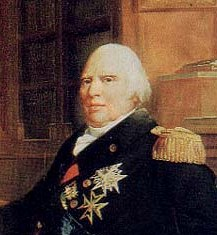
Louis XVIII failed to reassure the entire French population, leading some to hope for a return of the Empire.

That Napoleon should have sought to return to France is hardly extraordinary, since at the beginning of 1815 there was still a mass of Bonapartist opinion in the country, known to the authorities and the king himself from the moment he came to power. This mass was divided between soldiers, former members of the Grande Armée, who were dissatisfied with the new regime, and purchasers of national property from the Revolution, who were worried about the fate that would be reserved for them, even though the royal government showed no signs of threatening them, as the time was ripe for the reconciliation of all French people. Indeed, in his Saint-Ouen declaration, Louis XVIII said that the regime would never question the purchasers of national property, which disappointed the ultra-royalist clan.

When Louis XVIII returned to the throne, he made a series of clumsy decisions, alienating some of the population. While the authorities had an expiatory chapel built in memory of Louis XVI and Marie-Antoinette, the Grande Armée received not a single tribute, as Louis XVIII considered it pointless to praise a defeated army. Louis XVIII continued to denigrate the army's actions, even issuing an ordinance on May 12, 1814, reducing the army's strength and imposing the white flag of the kingdom of France, at the expense of the tricolor flag with which the army had fought for over 20 years. Thus, French soldiers died for their country as heroes, but were completely forgotten by the new regime. What's more, they were relegated to the margins of society because they had lost while defending the nation. The concept of nationalism completely escaped the king and his advisors, which played into the hands of Napoleon, who claimed it as his own. Many soldiers rallied to the Emperor for this reason, believing they were serving an ingrate in the King.

The population, which in some areas had to endure foreign occupation, suffered from unemployment and hardship, with no clear response from the authorities; on the other hand, Baron Louis's tax policy increased "indirect taxes" on popular products. The government's inaction in the face of the difficulties affecting the working classes and the maintenance of combined duties, including a highly unpopular tax on beverages, also contributed to the people's anger towards the regime. The people also feared a return to the Ancien Régime and the domination of the Church. Louis XVIII struggled to reassure the population, and rumors of a plot gained ground as soldiers and peasants grew nostalgic for the imperial regime, seen as a period of economic prosperity.

=== Flight of the "Eagle" and government reaction ===
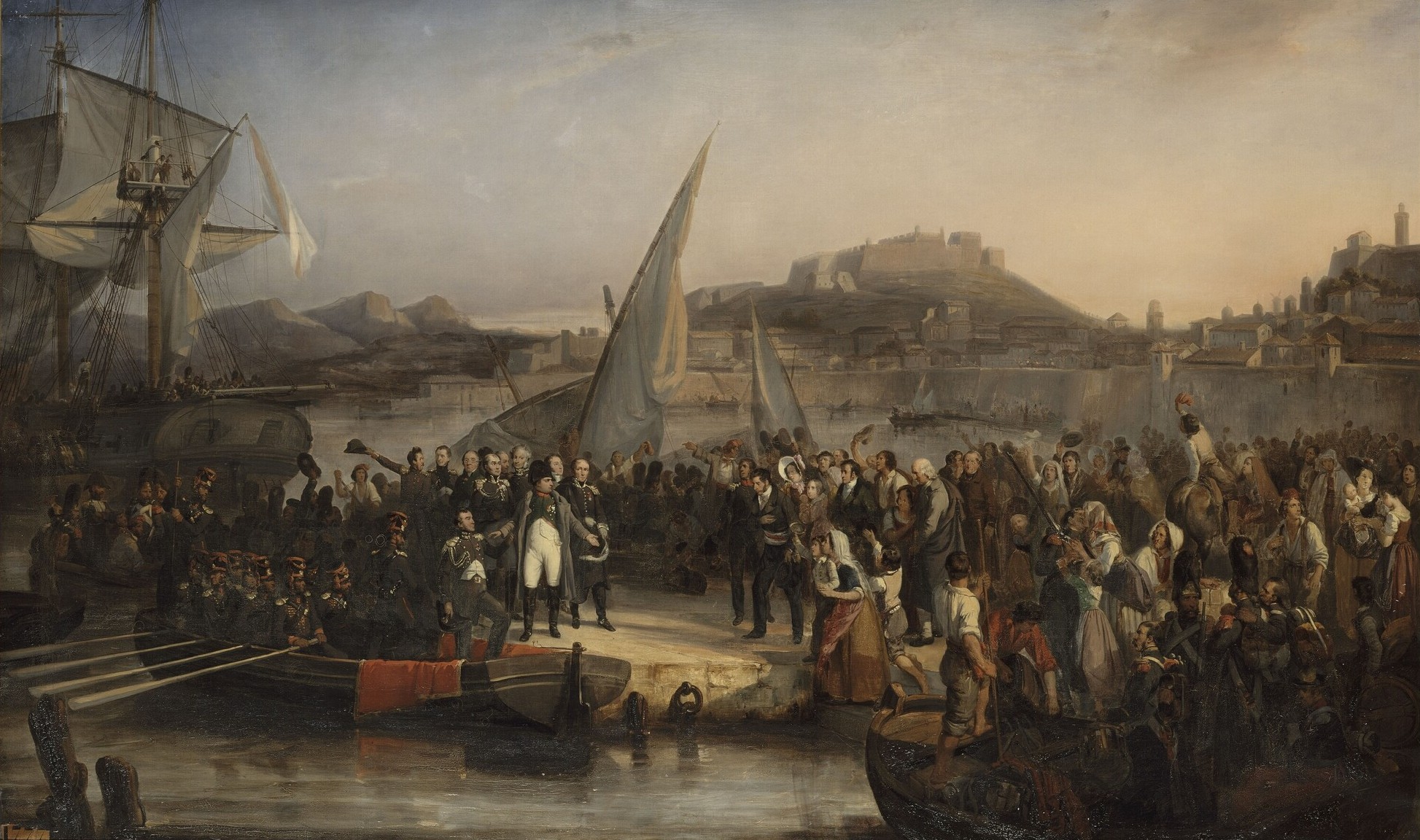
Napoleon's Departure from Elba by Joseph Beaume. Napoleon I's departure from Elba marked the start of the Hundred Days.

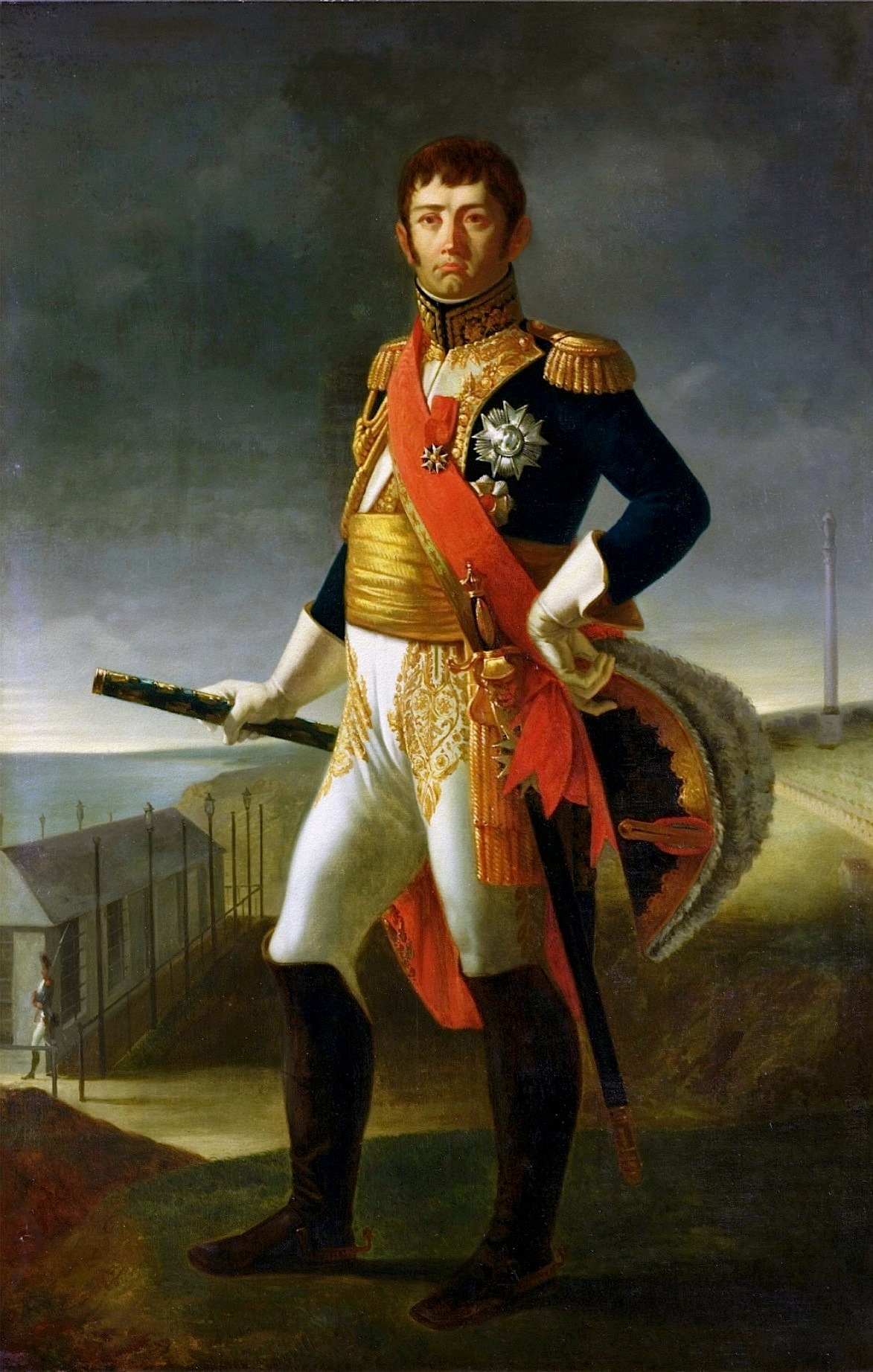
Soult, Minister of War and former Marshal of the Empire, was the perfect scapegoat for the Comte d'Artois.

Napoleon, rapidly tiring of Elba and not receiving the life annuity promised to him by the Bourbons when he went into exile, considered taking action. He began by deceiving everyone with a letter from one of his servants, intercepted by the spies of the powers at the Congress of Vienna, saying that he was returning to Naples to help Murat: "I am in the service of the first eagle in the world and therefore happy. [...] L'inconstant will leave in a few days for Naples with troops". These letters gave rise to a belief in a genuine Bonapartist plot to place Napoleon on the throne of an Italy reunited around him. The uncertainty surrounding Bonaparte's situation prompted him to act. Believing that surprise was the key to success, he secretly left Elba on February 26 and landed at Golfe Juan on March 1, 1815, with a handful of men.

The royal authorities only learned of the landing on March 5, 1815, via the telegraph. Chappe, the general administrator of the telegraph, received the message and took it immediately to Baron de Vitrolles, who in turn transmitted it to the sovereign in a sealed envelope. Louis XVIII quickly summoned Marshal Soult, who convinced him to keep silent about the events for at least twenty-four hours. Beyond this measure, Louis XVIII was particularly serene, which Vitrolles felt was a responsible attitude. The king's advisors, notably Beugnot and André, played a part in his almost blind optimism and confidence, but his entourage soon sent him serious warnings that the king did not heed. In the King's correspondence with Talleyrand, he mentions it in just a few lines, speaking above all of foreign affairs. In fact, Louis XVIII refused to acknowledge the danger. Napoleon continued his triumphal advance along the road that now bears his name, rallying, step by step, the soldiers who were supposed to come to arrest him, while the central authorities confined themselves to issuing an ordinance declaring Bonaparte a traitor on March 7.

Louis XVIII was sure of his fate, as were his ministers, who seemed certain that Napoleon would fall since the whole of Europe was united against him. Jaucourt, who was acting foreign minister in the absence of Talleyrand, who had left for the Congress of Vienna, did not speak out on the subject. Dambray, Minister of Justice, was a fervent royalist. It was he who had suggested that Louis XVIII date the charter to his nineteenth year in office. In general, almost all of Louis XVIII's ministers and royalists felt that the circumstances were right to remove Bonaparte once and for all. Vitrolles, for his part, thought that an army led by princes would be loyal to the Restoration, but this was not to be. The monarchy gradually realized that a regime without an effective police force (Beugnot abolished political spies, preventing Bonapartist plotters from being arrested) and without an army could not impose itself in the long term.

Faced with the gravity of the situation, the government made a series of mistakes. For example, the prefects, the representatives of central power in the provinces, received extremely vague instructions. On March 13, the Comte d'Artois denounced a plot by Soult and the army in general. Soult immediately tendered his resignation to the king, depriving the regime of his talents. He was replaced by Clarke. Louis XVIII set himself up as the guarantor of liberties. Following the advice of Louis and de Montesquiou, the King declared on March 12 that he was defending "public liberty, constitutional liberty, which they want to destroy", to no avail. On March 16, in a last stand, the king tried to convince the chambers of his determination to remain in power and thus defend the liberal charter: "Could I, at sixty, end my career better than by dying in its defense? Whatever happens, I won't leave my chair. The victim will be greater than the executioner". The chambers applauded him, but the speech had little effect.

=== International reaction ===
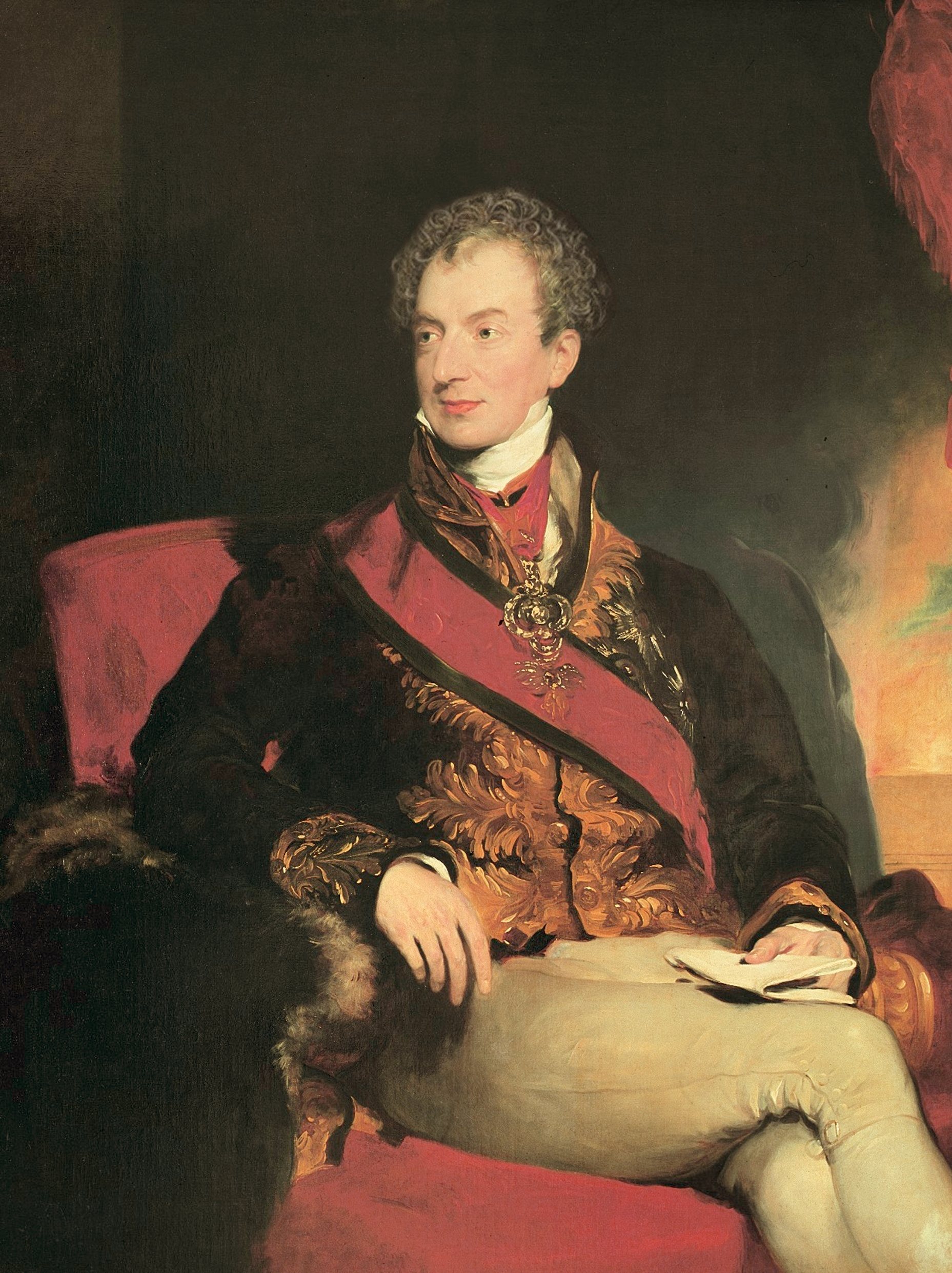
Klemens Wenzel von Metternich, Austrian ambassador

The countries taking part in the Congress of Vienna closely observed and spied on Napoleon. When they heard of Napoleon's ambitions to return to the continent, they threatened the ruler of Elba with forced exile to an island much farther from European shores, St. Helena. Napoleon never believed this threat, not only because of the unwavering support of his guard but also because of the adoration the people of Elba had for him, making exile impossible without prior resistance.

On March 7, when the news of Bonaparte's landing had just been made official by the Moniteur, the foreign ambassadors gathered at the Tuileries, where Louis XVIII declared: "Messieurs, I beg you to inform your courts that you found me well from gout and in no way worried by what has just happened. This will not disturb the rest of France or Europe." It was on this day that the Bourbon monarchy lost the support of the other European foreign powers who had placed it on the throne, and who realized that only Europe could put the brakes on Bonaparte. On March 9, the European powers offered Louis XVIII military aid, which he promptly refused. This clumsy decision caused the other powers to adopt a wait-and-see attitude. On the 18th, Louis XVIII begged the army to be loyal to him, "to spare the three hundred thousand foreigners whose arms I could no longer chain". With this declaration, Louis XVIII denigrated the foreign armies and wanted to restore the situation himself, which turned out to be a major political error, as he blocked the reinforcements that the foreign armies could have provided to defend his crown.

Foreign sovereigns were successively notified of Bonaparte's landing, the Emperor of Austria on March 7, the King of Prussia on March 9 and the King of the United Kingdom on March 10. On the 11th, The Times headlined: "The return of the miserable adventurer". Mutual distrust between the European sovereigns of the Sixth Coalition slowed Metternich's plans to stop the Emperor on March 7. It was finally on the 13th that the powers that had signed the first Treaty of Paris met in Vienna, at the congress that had been held since 1814. The congress aimed to reorganize Europe, but territorial and ideological disputes dragged on, and the stakes for Europe of an eventual agreement. Napoleon's return called into question the length of the congress and its inability to decide, and it was this return that united the European powers behind a common enemy, as the Emperor of Austria put it: "Fortunately, it is now that we are all together". The congress deplored Bonaparte's action as illegal, in violation of the 1814 treaty: "By thus breaking the convention which had established him on the island of Elba, Buonaparte destroys the only legal title to which his existence was attached ".

== Louis XVIII in exile ==
=== An inevitable escape ===
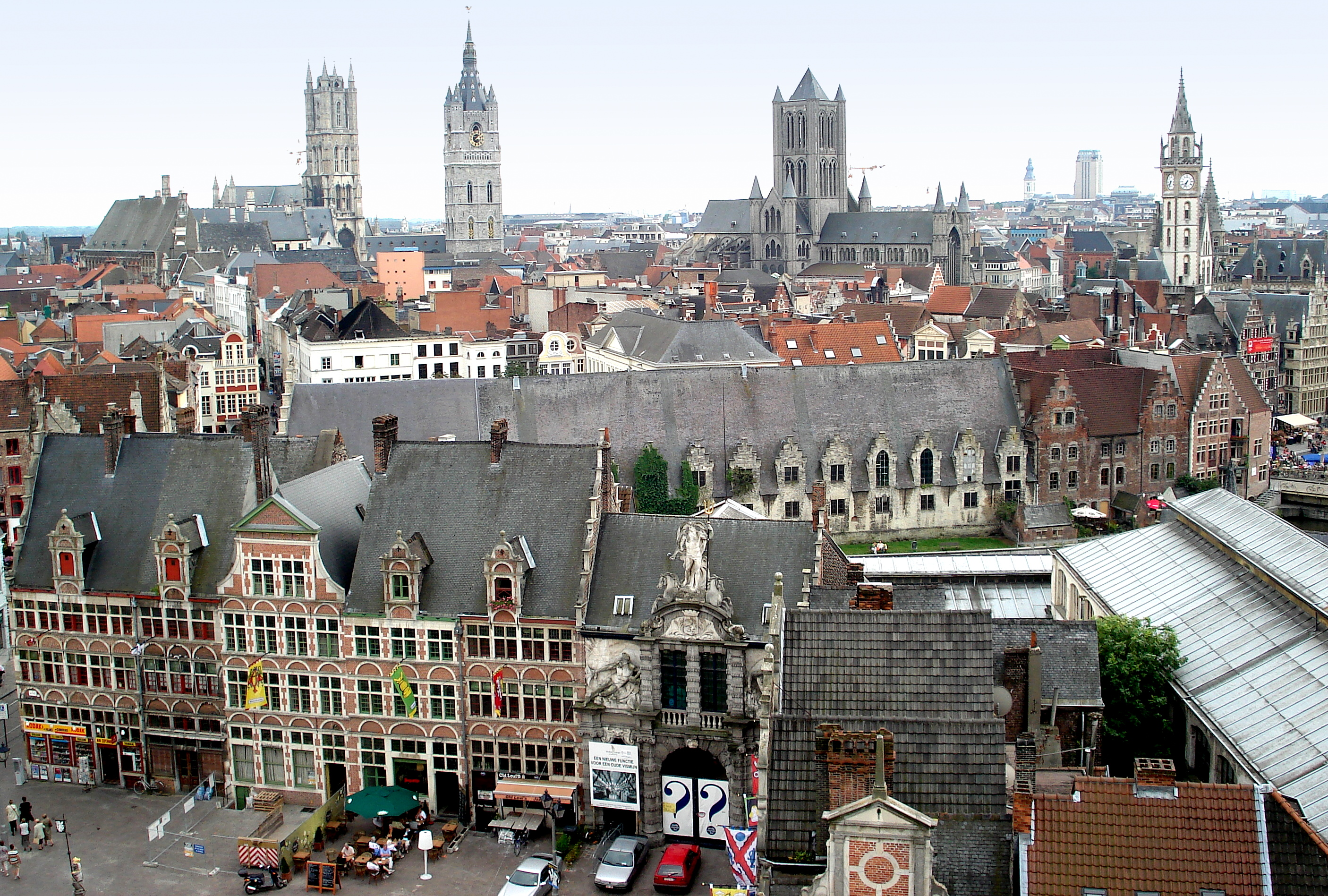
Ghent today

The king tried to mobilize public opinion in favor of the regime, but to no avail; Napoleon was acclaimed wherever he went. On March 19, Louis XVIII addressed the army, asking them to remain loyal, while promising forgiveness and oblivion to "misguided children". In reality, the king had been thinking of fleeing ever since Bonaparte's return was announced. Nevertheless, he sent the Duc de Berry to try and stop Bonaparte, but to no avail. At this point, he realized that the game was well and truly lost and that the die had been cast. For their part, Louis XVIII's ministers and entourage wanted to fight Napoleon. But they could not agree on the means. Jaucourt wanted Louis XVIII to go to the Vendée to gather support, while Chateaubriand and Marmont preferred the king to stay in Paris and defend himself. The king hesitated, despite the bad memories of his previous exile, and his entourage was divided. However, wanting to avoid bloodshed and civil war, Louis XVIII still preferred to flee and try to join the British to the north, as Macdonald advocated.

That's why, on March 19, the king threw in the towel: "I see that everything is over on this point. Let's not engage in pointless resistance. I am resolved to leave. After a review of the noble troops, he set off with those closest to him (in particular the Comte d'Artois and the Duc de Berry) and several of his ministers. In all, a dozen carriages left the Tuileries. The procession was preceded by the carriage of the king's first valet, Hue, whose orders were to take the crown jewels (worth several million pounds) to Lille or England. At around 11:30 p.m., in the pouring rain, Louis XVIII said his final farewells to the Tuileries and boarded a sedan, accompanied by a few horsemen. On the morning of the 20th, the Moniteur appeared with a statement by the king explaining his flight: "Divine providence, which has called us back to the throne of our fathers, is today allowing the throne to be shaken by the defection of part of the armed force which had sworn to defend it".

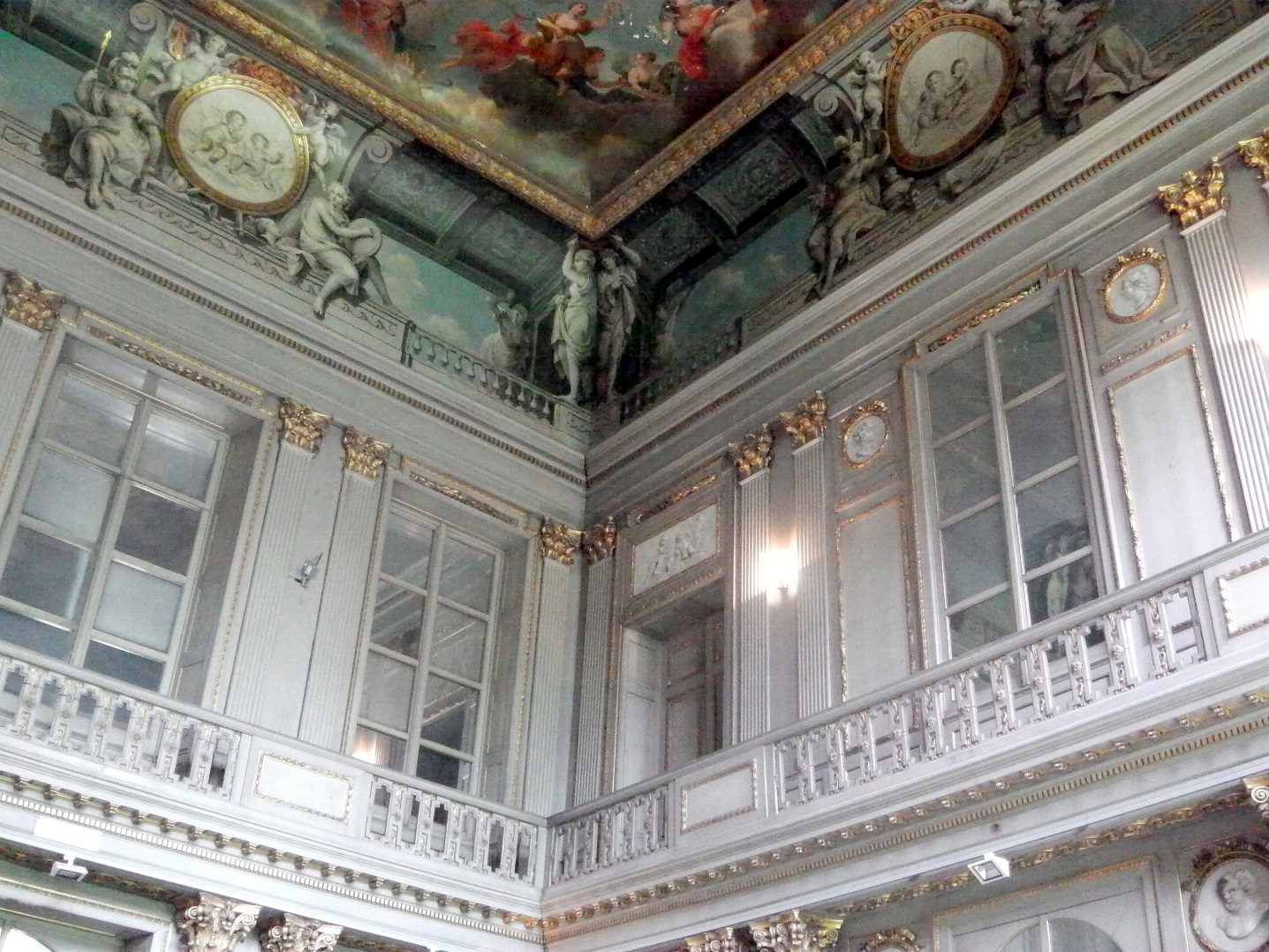
The ballroom of the Hotel d'Hane-Steenhuyse

Louis XVIII stayed at the Hôtel d'Hane-Steenhuyse in Ghent. The sovereign was accompanied by a guard, including the young Alphonse de Lamartine and Alfred de Vigny, who later depicted the scene in pathetic colors. Louis XVIII quickly distanced his Military House, which struggled on the roads of northern France and was finally disbanded by the Comte d'Artois on March 25. By then, the sovereign had already crossed the border on 23 and was still trying to rally public opinion by issuing a decree from Lille ordering all Frenchmen to disobey a mobilization order issued by Napoleon Bonaparte, but this decision was known only to his loyal followers, as public opinion had already turned the page on the monarchy.

The king finally arrived in Ghent, "the city of Charles V" according to Chateaubriand, on March 30, after having considered leaving for England. Louis XVIII and his court traveled more than 300 kilometers in a horse-drawn carriage in 10 days, a speed that was almost exceptional for the time, which bears witness to Louis XVIII's hasty escape. According to Jérôme Delandine de Saint-Esprit, Louis XVIII did not intend to stay outside France's borders for long, but when he learned what had happened to part of his military household, he decided to stay in Ghent for safety's sake. In reality, he encountered many obstacles: Dunkirk was in the hands of the Bonapartists. Headwinds prevented any crossing from March 24 to 30. The new king of the Netherlands was reluctant to welcome him to Brussels. Louis XVIII therefore chose Ghent, a Francophile city, following the advice of the Comte d'Artois. He was then joined by his entourage. The Orléans, who had withdrawn when sending troops against Bonaparte, were in England.

=== A reduced-scale yard without powers ===
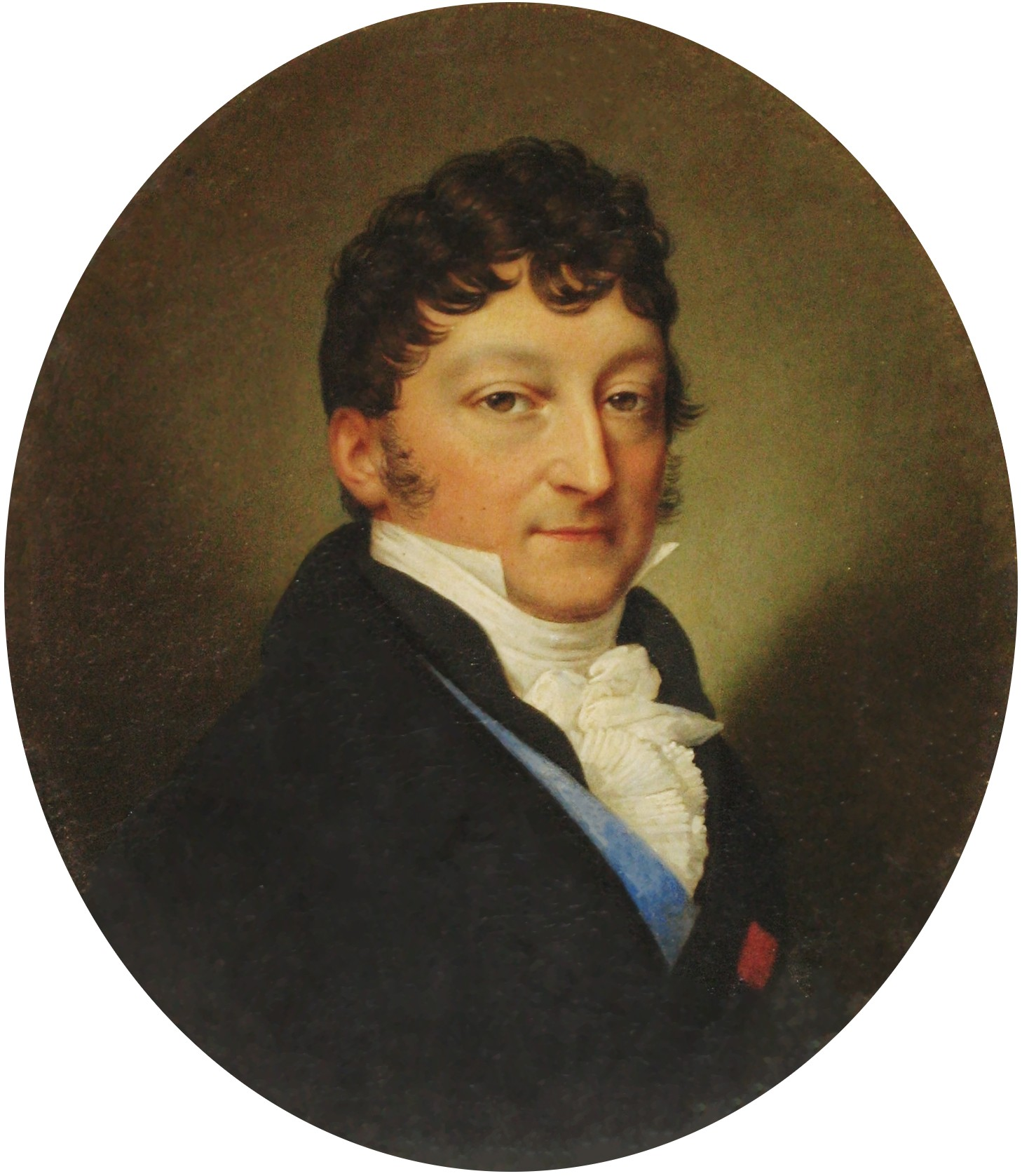
Blacas was one of the ministers who followed Louis XVIII to Ghent.

In Ghent, Louis XVIII stayed at the Hôtel d'Hane-Steenhuyse, the residence of Count Jean-Baptiste d'Hane-Steenhuyse, where he formed a scaled-down version of the court he held at the Tuileries. He found the apartment sublime, so much so that he said "this lodging was preferable to all those I had lived in on my first trip out of France". He formed a ministry, with Blacas at the King's Household, Beugnot at the Navy and Jaucourt at Foreign Affairs. All three had held these positions under the First Restoration, with Jaucourt acting in the interim. They were joined by Feltre for War, Lally for Public Instruction, and finally Chateaubriand for the Interior (the latter of whom the sovereign did not like very much). Messengers regularly kept the Sovereign abreast of French affairs, enabling different currents to lobby for their ideas. Such was the case with François Guizot, who went to the King's side to dispense advice from Royer-Collard. Louis XVIII also had some advisors who followed him to Ghent, including Marshal Marmont, (Note: It was the latter who commanded the troops against the insurgents during the Trois Glorieuses and defended the monarchy.) Duke of Ragusa, and Marshal Victor, Duke of Bellune. The Comte de Bourmont, meanwhile, joined the king in his final hours of exile, defecting to Napoleon on June 15, 3 days before Waterloo. Some, on the other hand, were conspicuous by their absence: such was the case of Talleyrand, who took advantage of his presence at the Congress of Vienna to temporize, not wanting to bury himself in what he contemptuously called the "Little Meeting of Ghent".

In practice, Louis XVIII had very little room for manoeuvre: the various royalist insurrections in France were defeated by Napoleon's forces. Even his own ministers saw the government as useless, starting with Chateaubriand, who described it as a "checkroom behind the scenes of the show opened in Paris". With the dissolution of the Maison Royale, the king no longer had any troops at his disposal, except a small contingent, which the allied powers refused to mix with their troops. Moreover, the government had to operate under the constant surveillance of the allies. For example, Louis XVIII quickly exhausted the coin reserves he had rushed from the Tuileries, and it was the British monarchy that minted twenty-franc coins to meet the needs of the government in exile, but above all to be able to coin money with the French once the British army had returned to France, making Louis XVIII completely dependent on England. They implicitly refused to discuss a possible return of the Bourbons to the throne and increasingly preferred his cousin Orléans. Louis XVIII was considered responsible for the Emperor's return and the ensuing unrest. Only the British were still in his favor, but their support remained cautious, as they awaited further developments. Thus, the Ghent government was subject to the goodwill of foreign powers, and could only keep up appearances. It was also affected by quarrels and rivalries between the exiles, who sought to attach themselves to the King.

=== The royalist idea during the Hundred Days ===
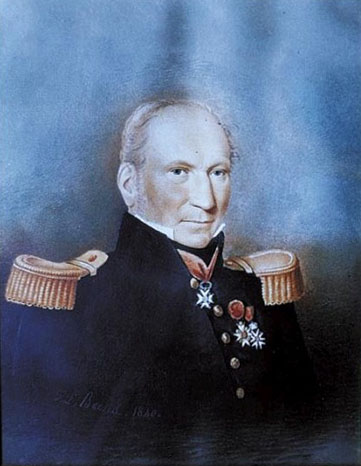
One of the Chouans colonels: Toussaint du Breil de Pontbriand

Many people, especially journalists, traveled to Ghent to demonstrate their loyalty to the sovereign, and to secure his favor should he return to power in France. Louis XVIII later said that his ministry, composed in part of journalists, was "a concession to the ideas of the time". All were united in their desire to see Louis XVIII returned to the throne and Napoleon ousted from power, starting with Louis XVIII himself, who published a manifesto on May 2 calling on "the French people to oust the usurper". While these supporters were unanimous on the two previous points, they differed sharply on the model of the monarchy they wanted to see restored and the position it should hold between the Charter of 1814 and the Ancien Régime. The entourage of Monsieur, the king's brother, was very much in favor of a tougher counter-revolution. Leading ultraroyalists such as Polignac, Sosthènes I de La Rochefoucauld and Crussol contributed to Louis-François Bertin's Journal universel, which later became Le Moniteur de Gand. Its first issue appeared on April 14, 1815, with a front-page sequence of ordinances issued by Louis XVIII to undermine Napoleon's legitimacy. The paper was created to keep up appearances and compete with the Moniteur universel, which remained in Paris and was used by the Bonapartists to denounce the excesses of the royalists. This enabled them to promote the idea of renewed emigration and betrayal by foreigners. Outside ultra-rightist circles, this image stuck for several years to those who participated in this exile, notably François Guizot during the July Monarchy. For their part, some royalists called for the King's return and circumvented Napoleonic censorship by writing songs. Louis XVIII thus became the little father of Ghent. (Note: The Battle of Waterloo, won by the coalition powers, led to the return of Louis XVIII.) Royalist newspapers also succeeded in conveying the idea of a similarity between the Emperor's return and the expression of the ideas of Robespierre and Marat.

Others, more liberal, also surrounded the sovereign. Chateaubriand was appointed Minister of the Interior. Louis XVIII, who disliked him, considered him useful to his cause. Unlike the sovereign's family, the man of letters advocated a more liberal monarchy, whose government should be based on the Charter. This idea of a more liberal monarchy was put forward by Chateaubriand in a report on the state of France on May 12, 1815, in which he wrote "We are ready to shed the last drop of our blood for you because we believe before God that you will maintain the constitution you have given to your people". Royer-Collard, head of the Paris underground constitutional committee, also maintained close relations with the king through Guizot. Last but not least, former Empire officials such as Portalis joined Louis XVIII in Ghent. It was these people who helped Louis XVIII understand why the Restoration had failed, and Louis XVIII accepted the idea of a slightly more liberal monarchy. In a speech on April 15, he vowed to "wipe out every trace of the abuses that might have alienated some Frenchmen from us", obviously targeting the ultras' temptations to return to the Ancien Régime.

Although Napoleon had returned to power in France, Louis XVIII remained serene and planned to return to France very soon. In an interview with Guizot, the latter was impressed by "the attitude and the look of this old man, motionless and as if nailed in his armchair, a haughty serenity, and in his weakness, a calm confidence in the strength of his name and his right "56. While France generally accepted the Emperor's return, Louis XVIII did not stand idly by and ordered expeditions to rally the population. Roger de Damas was sent to Switzerland to raise an army of Swiss guards57, while Louis de la Rochejaquelein was sent to the Vendée. Thanks to this action, the Bretons and Vendéens launched a new Chouannerie, just as they had done during the French Revolution to demand the return of the Ancien Régime. This unforeseen event forced Napoleon to send 10,000 soldiers to the region to maintain order, soldiers who would later be sorely missed by the Empire, particularly during the Belgian campaign, when the coalition forces were victorious. Other French departments also experienced unrest, such as Aveyron.

== Louis XVIII returns to the throne ==
=== Louis XVIII returns to Paris in defeat ===
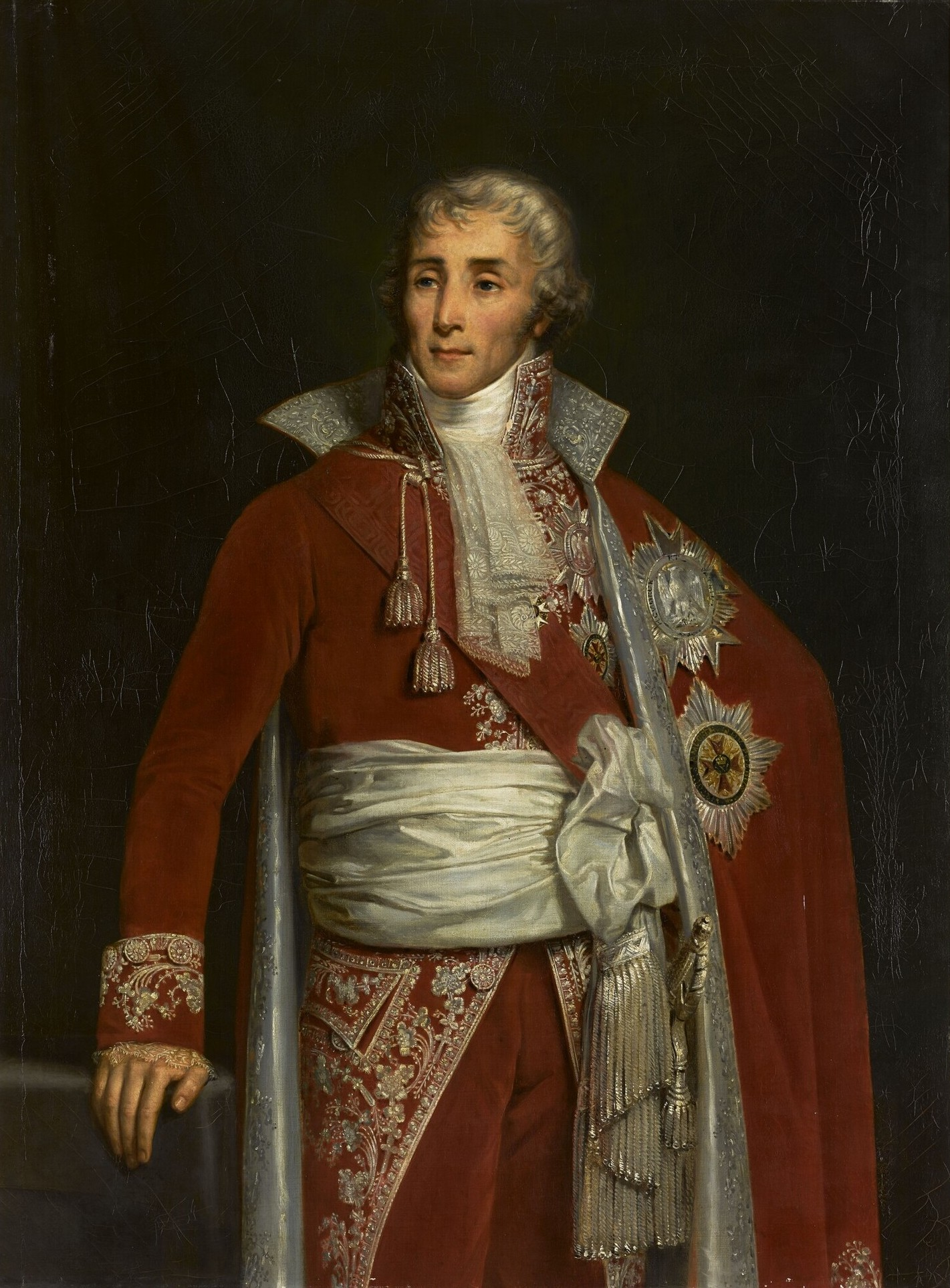
It was he who commanded the troops against the insurgents during the Trois Glorieuses and defended the monarchy.

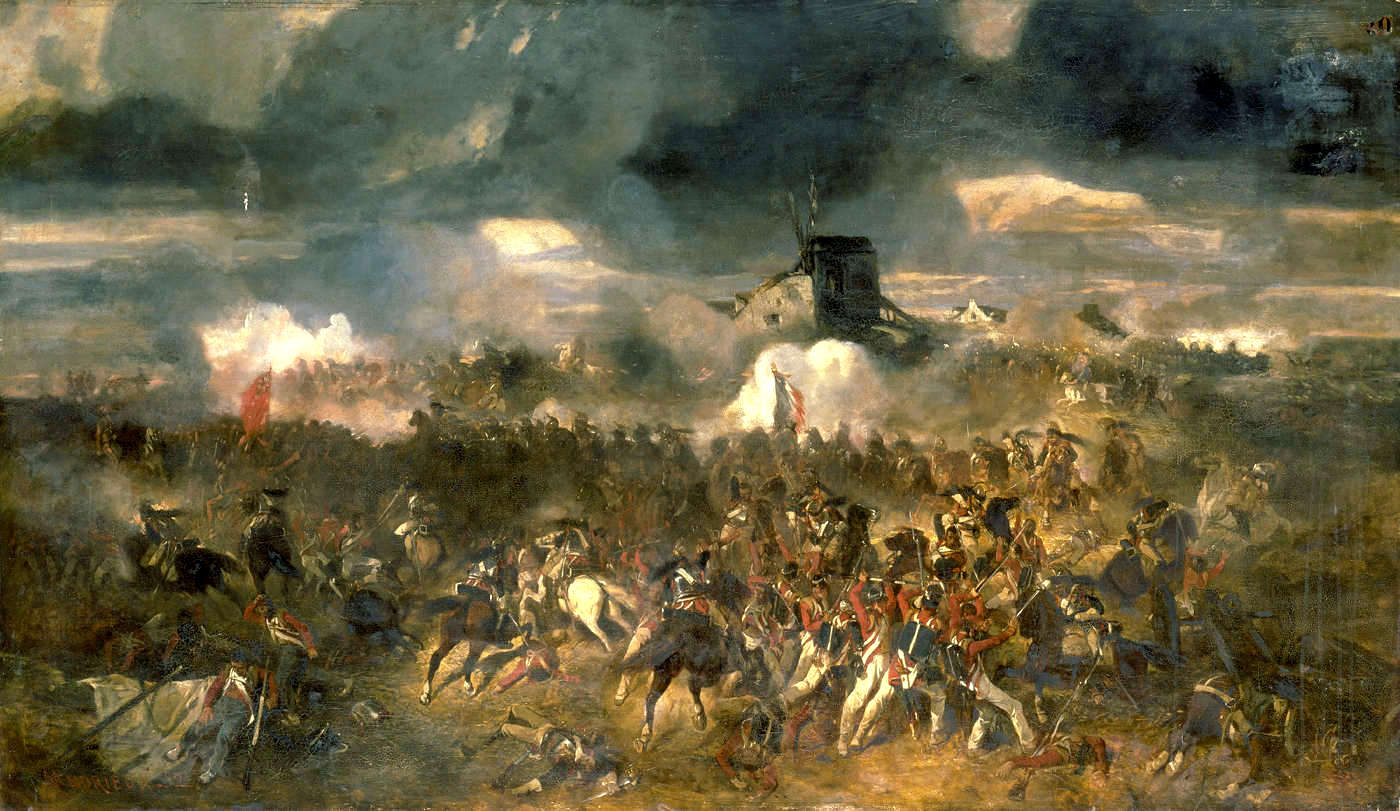
The Battle of Waterloo, won by the coalition powers, led to the return of Louis XVIII.

The foreign powers were determined to bring down Napoleon at all costs. On April 2, the sovereigns met in Frankfurt and decided to send Napoleon an ultimatum, giving him ten days to leave France or risk war. "They grant Napoleon Bonaparte ten days to leave France and return to the island that the clemency of the allies has left him. [...] Once this deadline had passed, [...] the allied powers declared Napoleon Bonaparte and the French armies irreconcilable enemies of France and Europe", explained Antoine de Saint-Gervais the following year. Louis XVIII was quick to approve this declaration: "You must no longer see in these foreigners [...] anything but generous allies".

In exile, the king was relatively powerless and had to await the results of action by foreign powers, who defeated Napoleon's troops at Waterloo on June 18, 1815. The news of Napoleon's defeat was delivered by Pozzo at seven o'clock the following morning: "The Duke of Wellington has charged me to inform Your Majesty of yesterday's events. His Lordship has won the most complete battle [...] and the enemies of France have been defeated after nine hours of fighting". The King, delighted with the news, toasted the coalition allies with Marshal Victor. The Bourbons' situation remained unenviable: except Wellington, who enjoyed the prestige of victory, the foreign representatives were not particularly favorable to the return of those who had failed to prevent the Emperor's return and decided to wait. In the end, it was thanks to the efforts of Fouché and Talleyrand, the principal and most influential ministers of the Napoleon II commission, that the sovereign returned to France. Fouché took it upon himself to convince the French notables in the chambers through a series of messages, and Talleyrand convinced foreign sovereigns that Louis XVIII's return to the throne was inevitable. On June 25, Louis XVIII returned to France, while Napoleon left Paris for Malmaison and, like Louis XVIII earlier, tried to save his fortune, handing over more than three million to Laffite, the banker and politician.

Attempts by Parisian royalists to restore Louis XVIII's legitimacy proved futile, as the king returned to France after the British soldiers. He arrived in Paris on July 8. Even those who had followed him to Ghent deplored his return, wounding national pride and cooling French attachment to their king. At a time when the country was occupied by foreign troops (a particularly severe occupation that lasted three years), this arrival forged an anti-national image of the regime, and the king was perceived as having returned "in the vans of foreigners", which became a recurring argument of the regime's opponents until 1830.

=== White terror and the case of the army ===
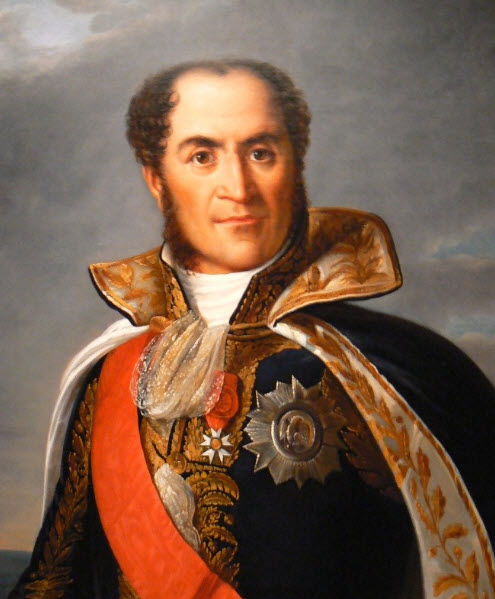
Marshal Brune of the Empire is thrown into the Rhône by the royalist crowd in Avignon.

Aware that he was returning to dramatic circumstances, on June 28, in a speech in Cambrai, Louis XVIII forgave all those who had collaborated with the Emperor after March 23 but was intransigent concerning those who had betrayed him before (particularly the army). When the sovereign came to power, he tried to pursue a moderate policy, but the resentment of the ultras towards traitors caught up with him and he was unable to oppose it. He rushed to declare, using an ordinance drafted by Fouché, the disqualification of those considered traitors. The officers who had rallied to the Emperor during the Hundred Days were brought before a council of war (three, including Marshal Ney, were sentenced to death), while the others were placed under house arrest pending their appearance before the Chamber of Peers. This ordinance was a veritable proscription, seen as the first act of the White Terror led by the ultra-royalists against republicans and Bonapartists defending revolutionary ideas: "France will thus be, for many years to come, cut into two enemy peoples, as Father de Bertier summed it up". Louis XVIII did not stop there, however, aware that he owed his exile to the army's defection to him. The Corps Francs that Napoleon had created on April 22, 1815 to defend France were disbanded by royal decree on July 20, 1815. On August 1, the imperial army was disbanded. This brutal dismissal, accompanied by the excesses of the White Terror, caused part of the army to break with royalty, who then plotted against it with the Republicans and Bonapartists within secret societies such as the Charbonnerie.

The legislative elections scheduled for August were held in a climate of tension caused by the White Terror. In Toulouse, the president of the electoral college was ousted in favor of Villèle. In Nîmes, thirteen Protestants were massacred on the eve of the vote. In 46 départements, foreign occupation troops disrupted operations by arresting Jacobins and Bonapartists. The elected chamber was overwhelmingly composed of royalists, and was nicknamed the "Untraceable Chamber". This chamber was made up of 350 ultras for 391 seats, but Louis XVIII understood that it was circumstances that had brought these people to power, and had no intention of governing with them. The Chamber was not made up of old émigrés eager to return to the Ancien Régime. Of the 381 deputies in the Chamber at the beginning of the summer of 1816, there were 197 original bourgeois and 8 Empire ennobles, compared with only 176 Ancien Régime nobles; there were 90 former émigrés, most of whom had accepted military or civil functions under the Empire. Among the bourgeois, there were 91 lawyers, magistrates, and jurists, and 25 merchants and industrialists. Most were newcomers, with only 33 deputies belonging to the Chamber of 1814 and 17 to that of the Hundred Days. It was these men who introduced the "Legal Terror" and gave a new lease of life to the ultra party, so much so that they were considered the party's "lifeblood".

== See also ==
- Second White Terror
- Congress of Vienna
- Hundred Days
- Waterloo campaign

== Bibliography ==
- Bertaud, Jean-Paul (2010). Les Royalistes et Napoléon. Flammarion. ISBN 978-2-08-123583-0.
- Bertaud, Jean-Paul (2011). L'abdication: 21-23 juin 1815. Flammarion. ISBN 978-2-08-127860-8.
- Baylac, Marie-Hélène (2013). Napoléon. Empereur de l'île d'Elbe: Avril 1814 - Février 1815. Tallandier. ISBN 979-10-210-0189-3.
- Castelot, André (1997). Charles X: la fin d'un monde. Perrin. ISBN 2-262-01783-2.
- Cyr, Pascal (2011). Waterloo: origines et enjeux. L'Harmattan. ISBN 978-2-296-45613-6.
- Delandine de Saint-Esprit, Jérôme (1817). Le panache d'Henri IV, ou les phalanges royales de 1815. Egron.
- Démier, Francis (2012). La France sous la Restauration (1814 - 1830). Paris: Gallimard. ISBN 978-2-07-039681-8.
- Gabory, Émile; Du Boisrouvray, Xavier (1989). Les Guerres de Vendée, coll. " Bouquins ". Robert Laffont. ISBN 978-2-221-05405-5. OCLC 417194147.
- Gilmore, Jeanne (1997). La République clandestine (1818-1848) coll. « Aubier histoires ». Paris: Aubier. ISBN 2-7007-2281-7.
- Godlewski, Guy (2014). Napoléon à l'île d'Elbe. Nouveau Monde éditions. ISBN 978-2-36943-043-8.
- Goujon, Bertrand (2012). Monarchies postrévolutionnaires,1814 - 1848 coll. « L'univers historique, Histoire de la France contemporaine », 443 p. (ISBN. Paris: Seuil. ISBN 978-2-02-103347-2.
- Jardin, André; Tudesq, André-Jean (1973). La France des notables: I. L'évolution générale, 1815 - 1848. Seuil. ISBN 2-02-000666-9.
- Lentz, Thierry (2010). Nouvelle histoire du Premier Empire: Les Cent-Jours: 1815. Fayard. ISBN 978-2-213-65994-7.
- Louis XVIII, Mémoires de Louis XVIII, vol. 10. Mame-Delauney. 1833.
- Mollier, Jean-Yves; Reid, Martine; Yon, Jean-Claude (2011). Repenser la Restauration. Nouveaux Monde. ISBN 978-2-36583-090-4.
- Pons de l'Hérault, André (2005). Napoléon, empereur de l'Île d'Elbe: souvenirs et anecdotes de Pons de l'Hérault. Paris: Les éditeurs libres. ISBN 2-916399-00-3.
- de Saint-Gervais, Antoine (2007) [1816]. Histoire de Sa Majesté Louis XVIII, surnommé le Désiré: depuis sa naissance jusqu'au traité de paix de 1815. Blanchard. ISBN 2-296-54244-1.
- Thiébaud, Jean-Marie; Tissot-Robbe, Gérard (2011). Les corps francs de 1814 et 1815: la double agonie de l'empire: Les combattants de l'impossible coll. « Kronos », (préf. Jean Tulard). Paris, S.P.M. ISBN 978-2-901952-82-4.
- Tort, Olivier (2008). Jeunes en politique. L'Harmattan. ISBN 978-2-296-57597-4.
- Tulard, Jean (2001). Les vingt jours: Louis XVIII ou Napoléon ?. Paris: Fayard. ISBN 2-213-60867-9.
- de Waresquiel, Emmanuel (2008). Cent Jours: La tentation de l'impossible mars- juillet 1815. Fayard. ISBN 978-2-213-64476-9.
- de Waresquiel, Emmanuel; Yvert, Benoît (1996). Histoire de la Restauration (1814-1830) (in French). Éditions Perrin. ISBN 978-2-262-00912-0.
- Derré, J. R. (1969). Chateaubriand et Bonald. Cahiers de l'Association internationale des études françaises.
- Dyer, G. P. (1976). L'atelier Royal de Londres et la frappe de louis d'or en 1815. Revue numismatique.
