= The Attack on the City Hall of Paris =

Painting by Joseph Beaume

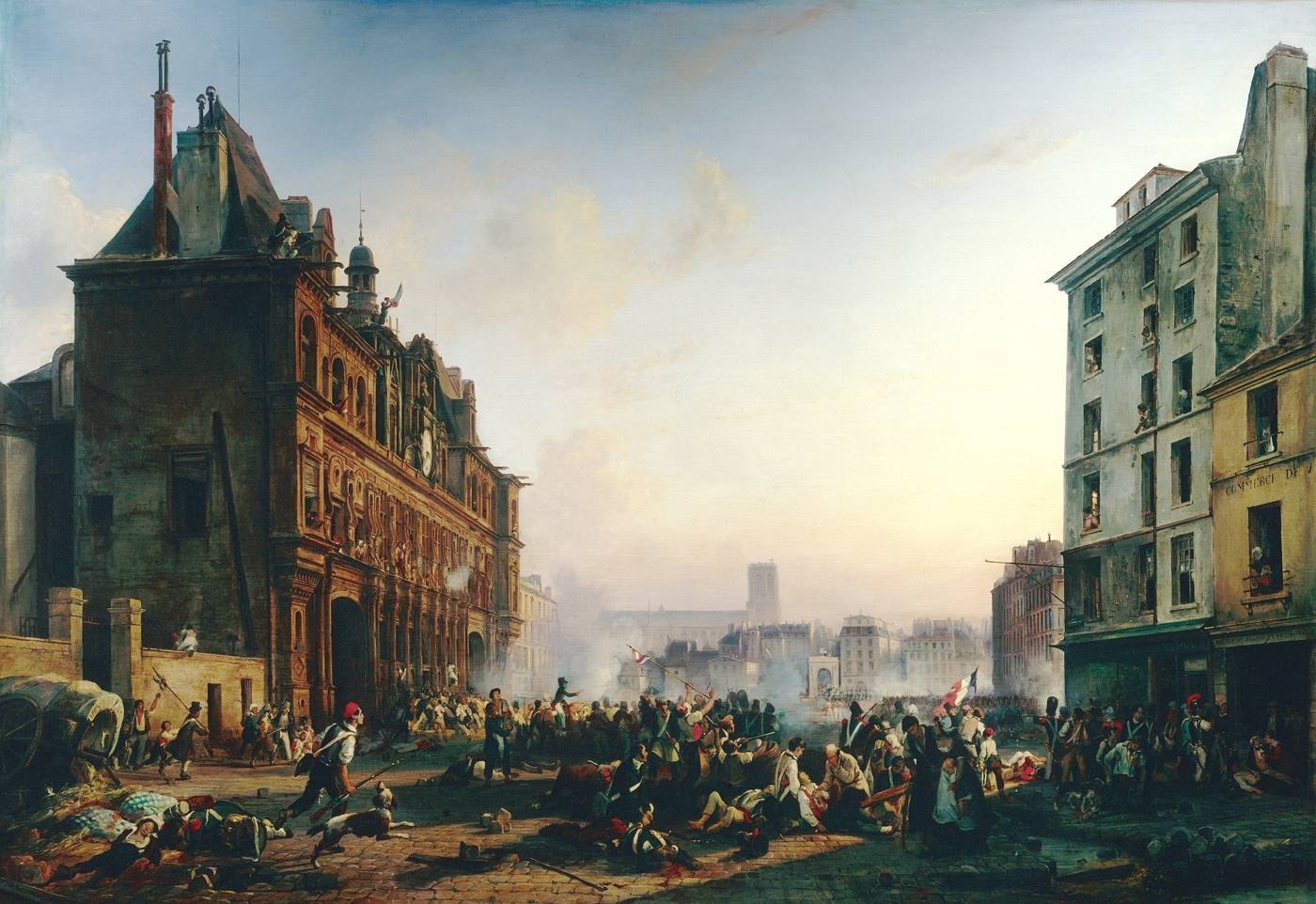
- Artists: Joseph Beaume, Charles Mozin
- Year: 1831
- Type: Oil on canvas, history painting
- Dimensions: 145 cm × 210 cm (57 in × 83 in)
- Location: Palace of Versailles, Versailles

The Attack on the City Hall of Paris (French: Attaque de l'Hôtel de Ville de Paris, le 28 juillet 1830) is an 1831 history painting by the French artists Joseph Beaume and Charles Mozin. It features a scene from the July Revolution of 1830, when on 28 July a crowd stormed the City Hall of Paris.

The uprising ousted the last monarch of the Bourbon dynasty Charles X and brought in the July Monarchy of Louis Philippe I. It was Louis Phillipe who commissioned this painting for 3,000 francs to commemorate the event. The painting was exhibited at the Salon of 1831 at the Louvre. It was one of at least twenty five paintings that depicted the previous year's revolution. It is now in the Museum of French History, at the Palace of Versailles.

== Bibliography ==
- Brown, Marilyn R. The Gamin de Paris in Nineteenth-Century Visual Culture: Delacroix, Hugo, and the French Social Imaginary. Taylor & Francis, 2017.
- Rose, John Mark. The Revolution Takes Form: Art and the Barricade in Nineteenth-Century France. Penn State University Press, 2024.
