= Joseph Beaume =

French painter (1796–1885)

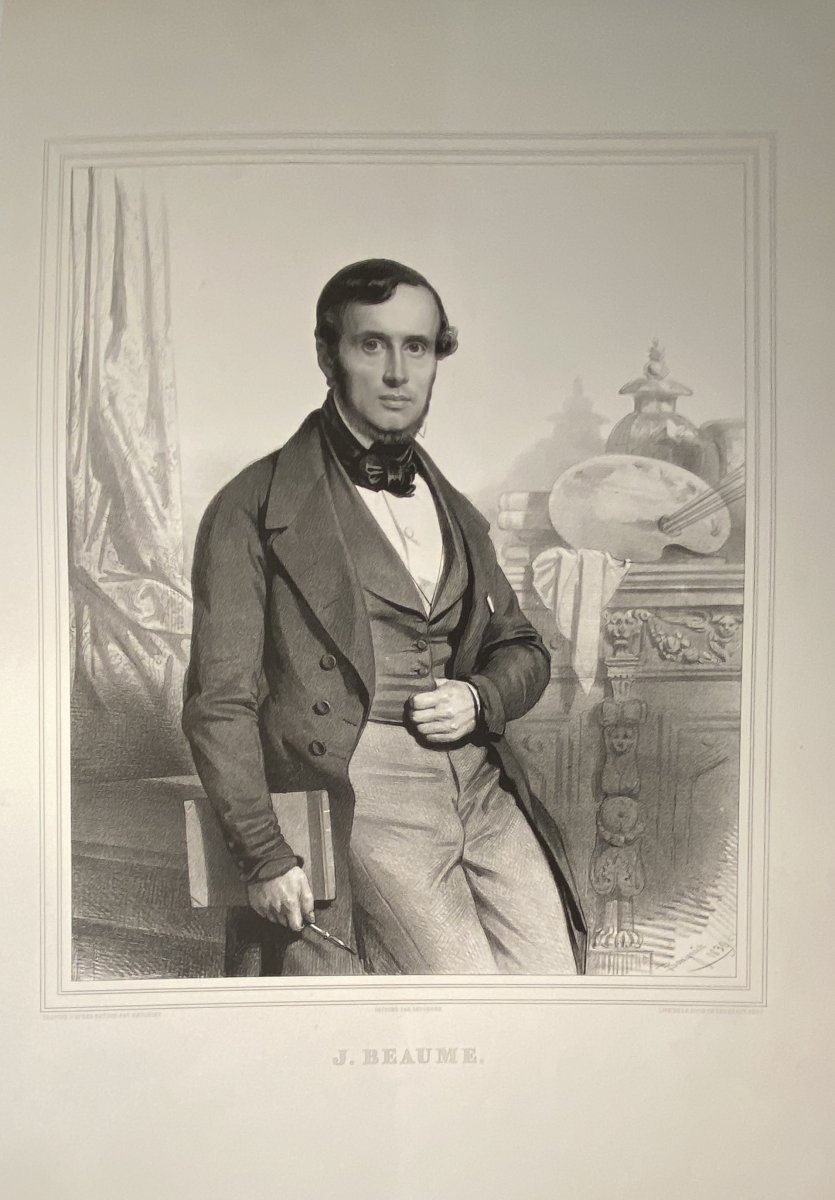
- Died: Paris
- Known for: Painting

Joseph Beaume (27 September 1796 in Marseilles – 11 September 1885 in Paris) was a French historical painter.

== Biography ==
Baume was a favourite pupil of Antoine-Jean Gros and a frequent contributor to the Salon between 1819 and 1878. In the July Monarchy of Louis Philippe I he was commissioned to paint several large battle pieces for the Palace of Versailles. His "Henri III. on his Death-bed" was in the Luxembourg in 1903. Napoleon's Departure from Elba was produced for Versailles. It was originally intended to be displayed at the Salon of 1836 but was withdrawn following the Strasbourg Coup by Louis Napoleon.

In 1836 he was made a Knight of the Legion of Honour. He died in Paris in September 1885.

== Gallery ==
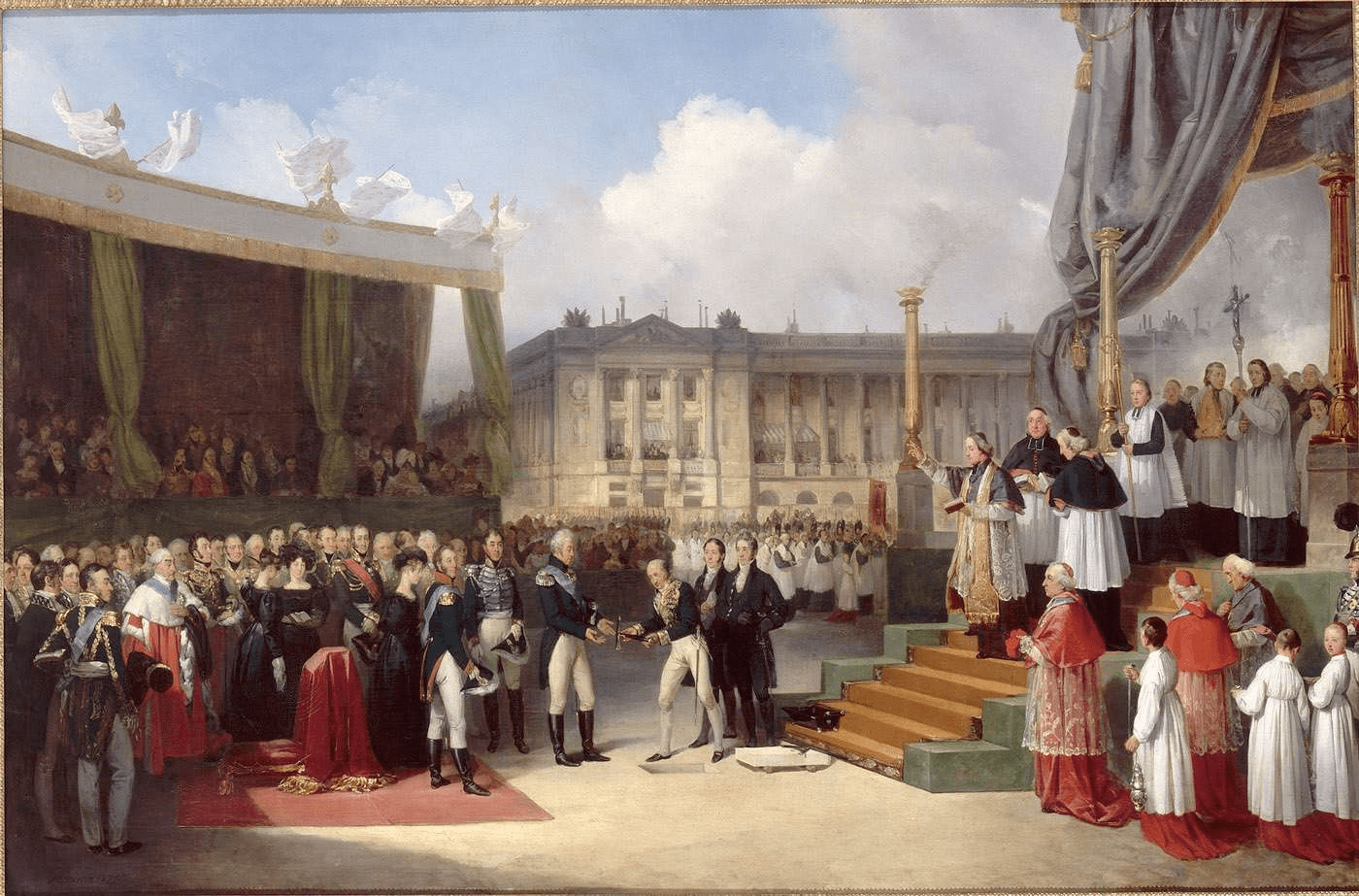
Inauguration of the Monument of Louis XVI by Charles X, 1827

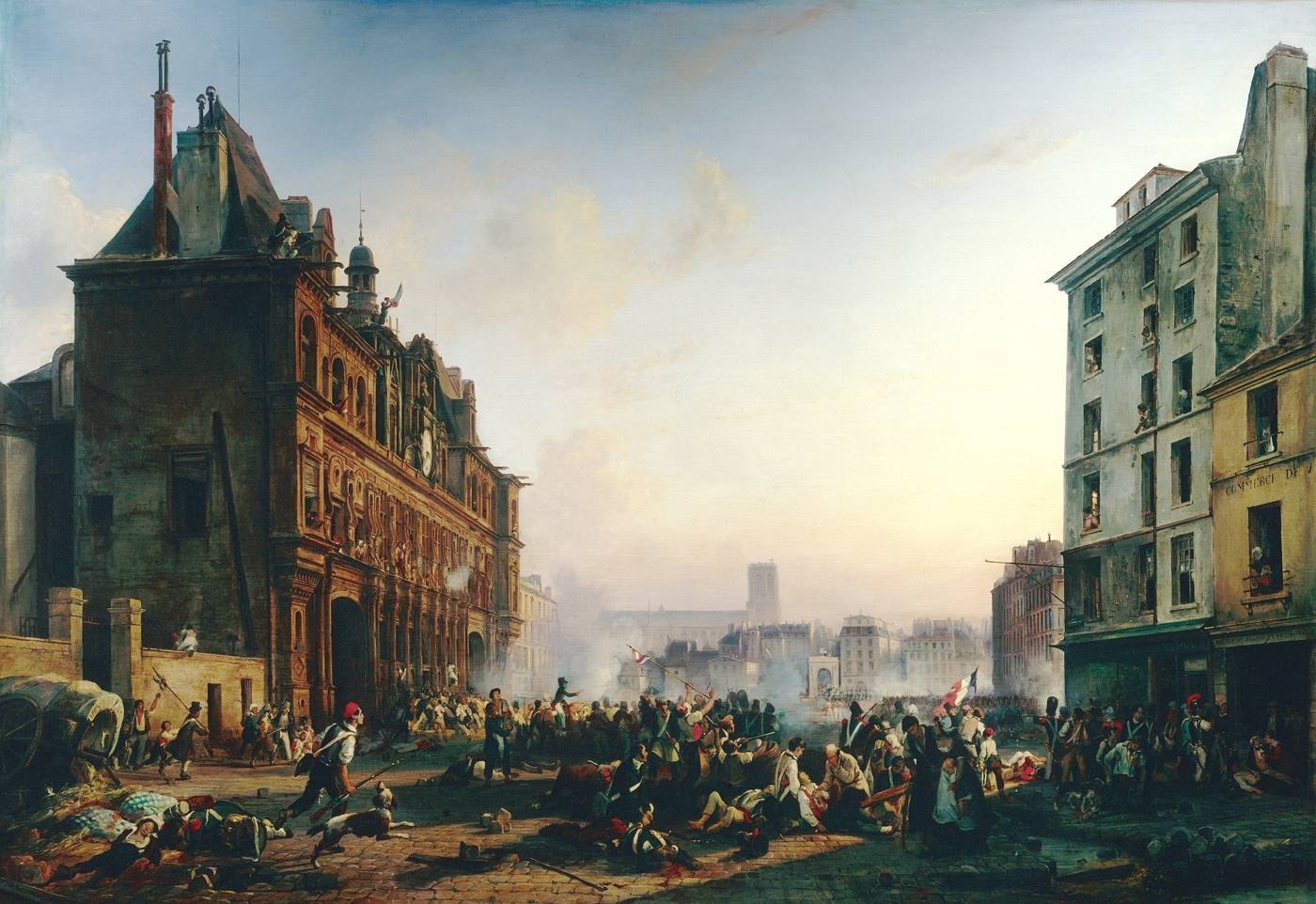
The Attack on the City Hall of Paris, 1831

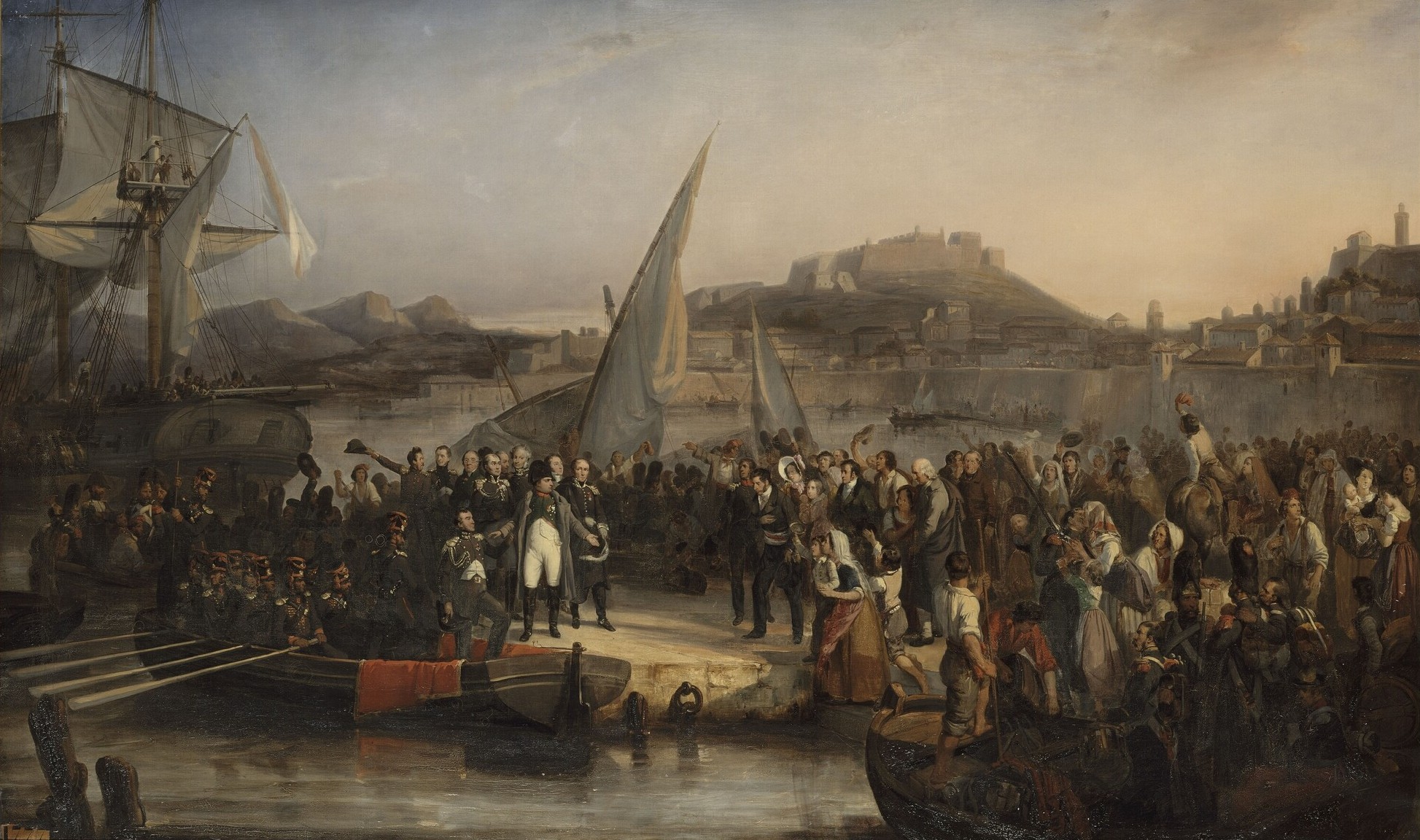
Napoleon's Departure from Elba, 1836
