= Napoleon's Departure from Elba =

Painting by Joseph Beaume

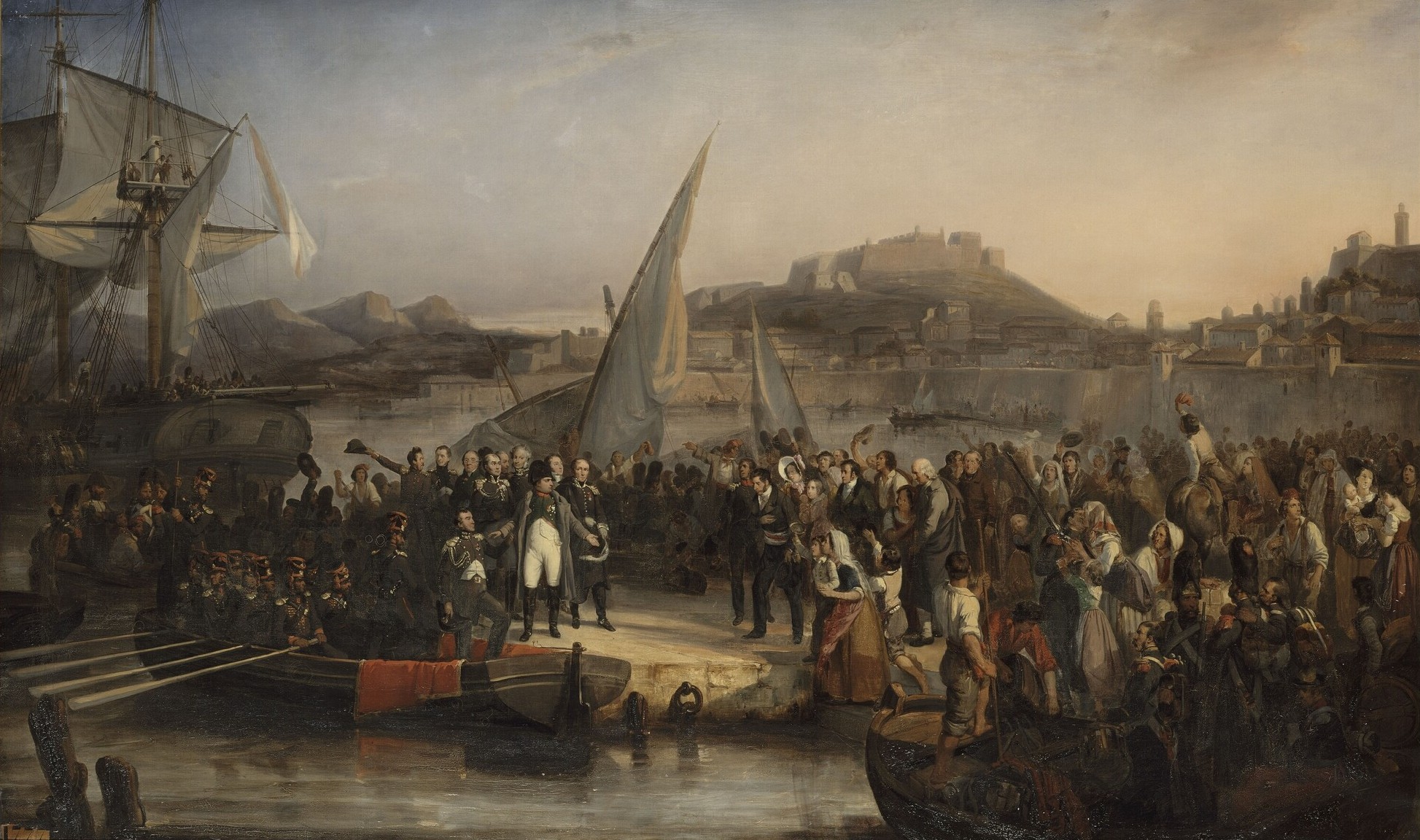
- Artist: Joseph Beaume
- Year: 1836
- Type: Oil on canvas, history painting
- Dimensions: 164 cm × 275 cm (65 in × 108 in)
- Location: Palace of Versailles; Versailles

Napoleon's Departure from Elba (French: Napoléon Ier quittant l'île d'Elbe) is an 1836 history painting by the French artist Joseph Beaume. It depicts the departure of Napoleon, the deposed Emperor of France, from the Mediterranean island of Elba on 26 February 1815. He would land in France and launch the Hundred Days campaign that ended with his defeat at the Battle of Waterloo.

The painting was commissioned by Louis Philippe I for 4,500 francs for the new Museum of French History at the Palace of Versailles. During the July Monarchy a number of paintings were produced glorifying the Napoleonic era. Other figures show in the painting are Henri Gatien Bertrand, Pierre Cambronne, Pierre Antoine Anselme Malet, Paweł Jerzmanowski and Pietro Traditi, the mayor of Portoferraio. The work was originally intended to be exhibited at the Salon of 1836 at the Louvre, but was withdrew in the wake of the failed Strasbourg Coup attempted by Napoleon's nephew Louis Napoleon.

== Bibliography ==
- Braude, Mark. The Invisible Emperor: Napoleon on Elba. Profile Books, 2018.
- Goldstein, Robert Justin. Out of Sight: Political Censorship of the Visual Arts in Nineteenth-century France. Yale University Press, 2012.
- Wootten, Geoffrey. Waterloo 1815: The Birth of Modern Europe. Bloomsbury Publishing, 2012.
