= Charles Mozin =

French painter (1806–1862)

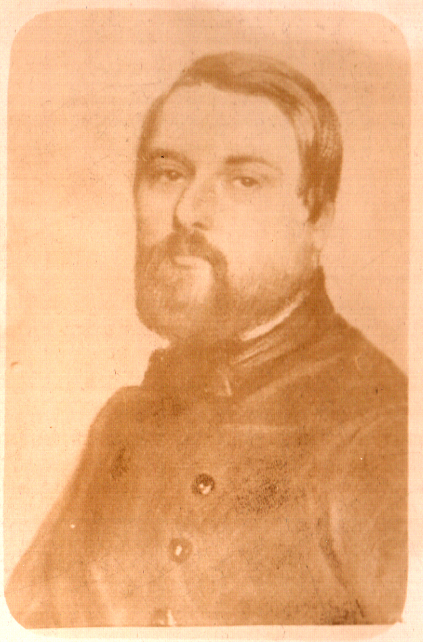
1851 portrait of Mozin

Charles Mozin (March 12, 1806 – November 7, 1862) was a French painter, draftsman and lithographer.

== Biography ==
Born into a family of musicians, his brother, Théodore Mozin, was second grand prix de Rome in musical composition in 1841, was a composer and professor at the Conservatoire Musical de Paris; his father, composer Benoit Mozin, was also a professor there and introduced his son Charles. But his true passion was painting. Charles Mozin entered the workshop of Xavier Leprince where he participated in the Embarquement des bestiaux à Honfleur. He discovered Trouville-sur-Mer in 1825.

In 1828, by introducing his friend Henri Rittner, a print dealer to Adolphe Goupil, he gave rise to the house Rittner & Goupil.

He married Pauline Coïc, daughter of Julien Désiré Abel Coïc, on May 11, 1829 and had two daughters. He settled in Trouville in 1839, building his house on a plot of land purchased in the Place de la Cahotte, a building that still exists.

Mozin was elected to the Trouville City Council in 1843 and participated in the development of the city.

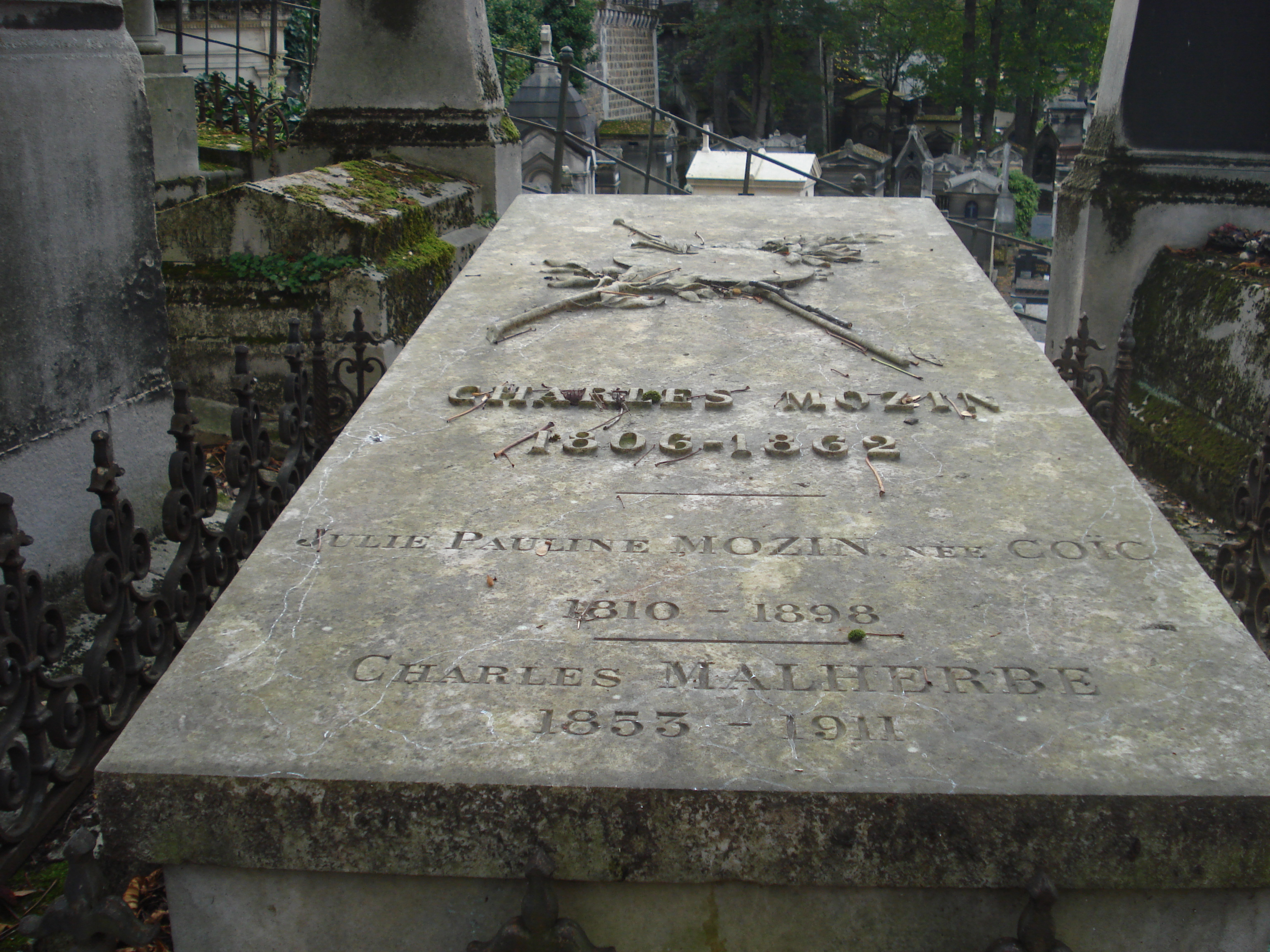
Tomb of Charles Mozin and Charles Malherbe - Montmartre Cemetery

He also built later the tour Malakoff, meeting point for lovers of the Roches Noires. Discoverer of Trouville, according to Yves Bayard, Charles Mozin sold his first painting to the Duchess of Berry.

He died in 1862 and his body was buried in the Montmartre cemetery in Paris. The sale of the atelier took place in 1865 at the Hotel Drouot and consisted of two hundred and seven paintings, drawings, watercolors and models of boats that served as models.

Musician and composer Charles Malherbe (1853-1911) was his grandson and painter Fernand Piet (1869-1842) his great-grandson.

Engraver Frederic Martens was the author of large aquatints taken from his paintings.

== Gallery ==
Opere di Charles Mozin

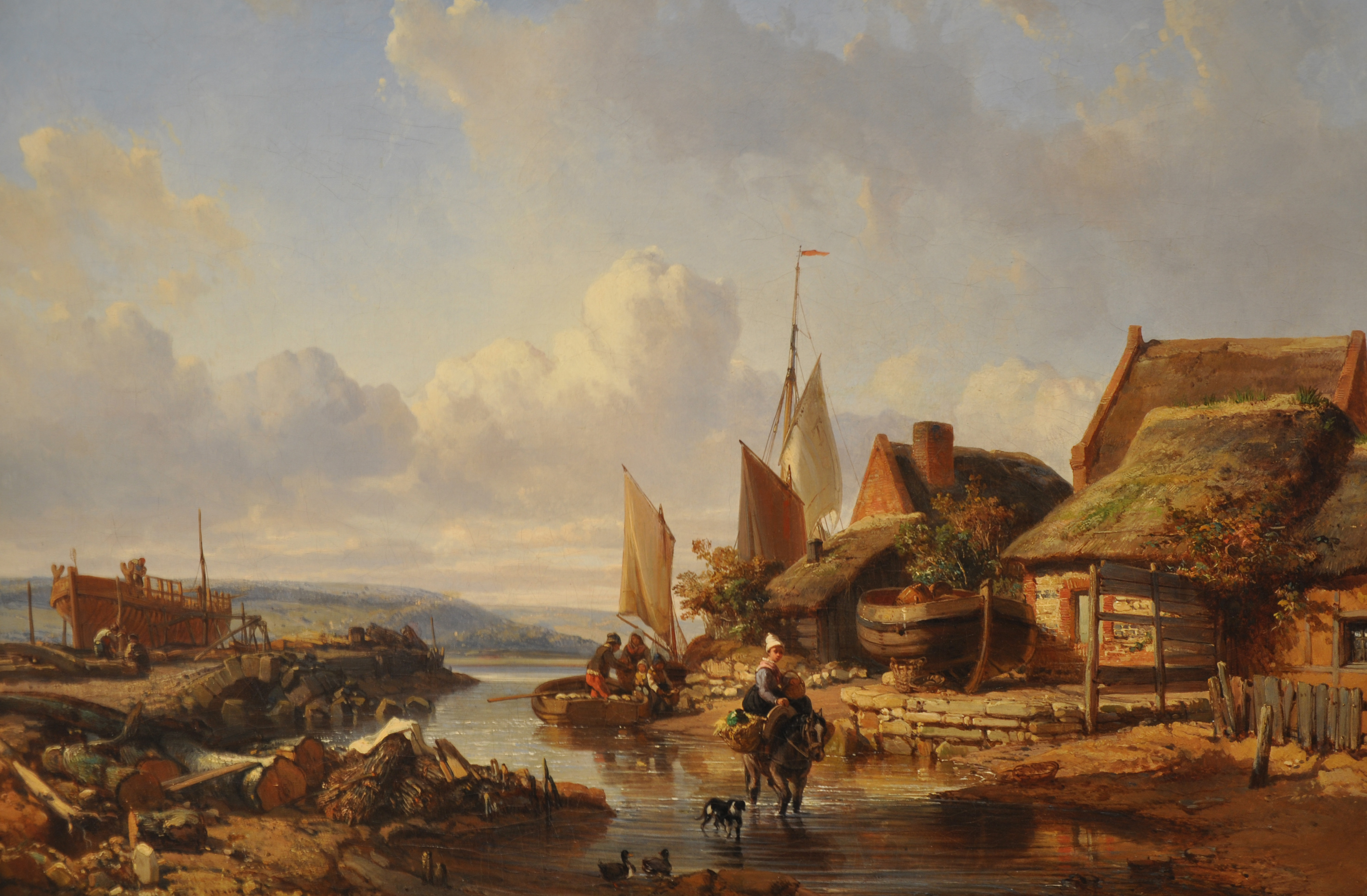
The Confluent of the creek of Calenville with the River Touques, or Le Quernet

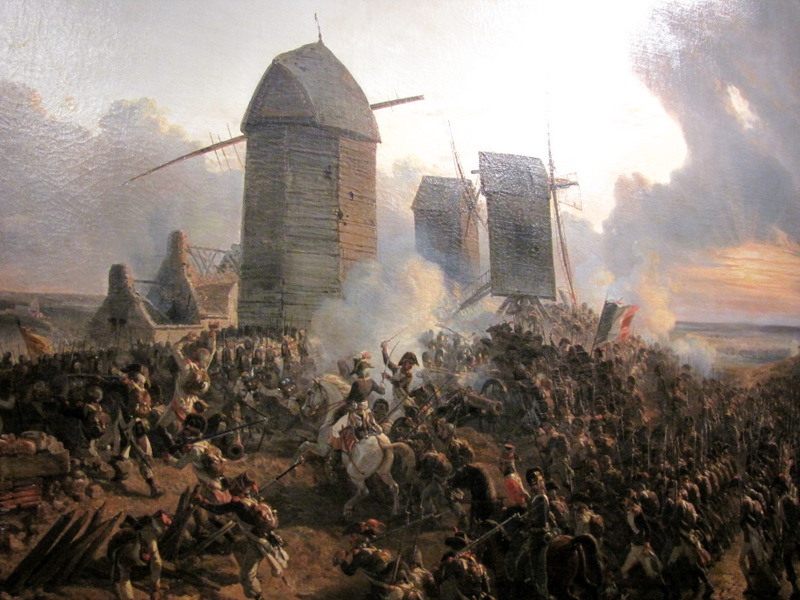
The Battle of Mouscron

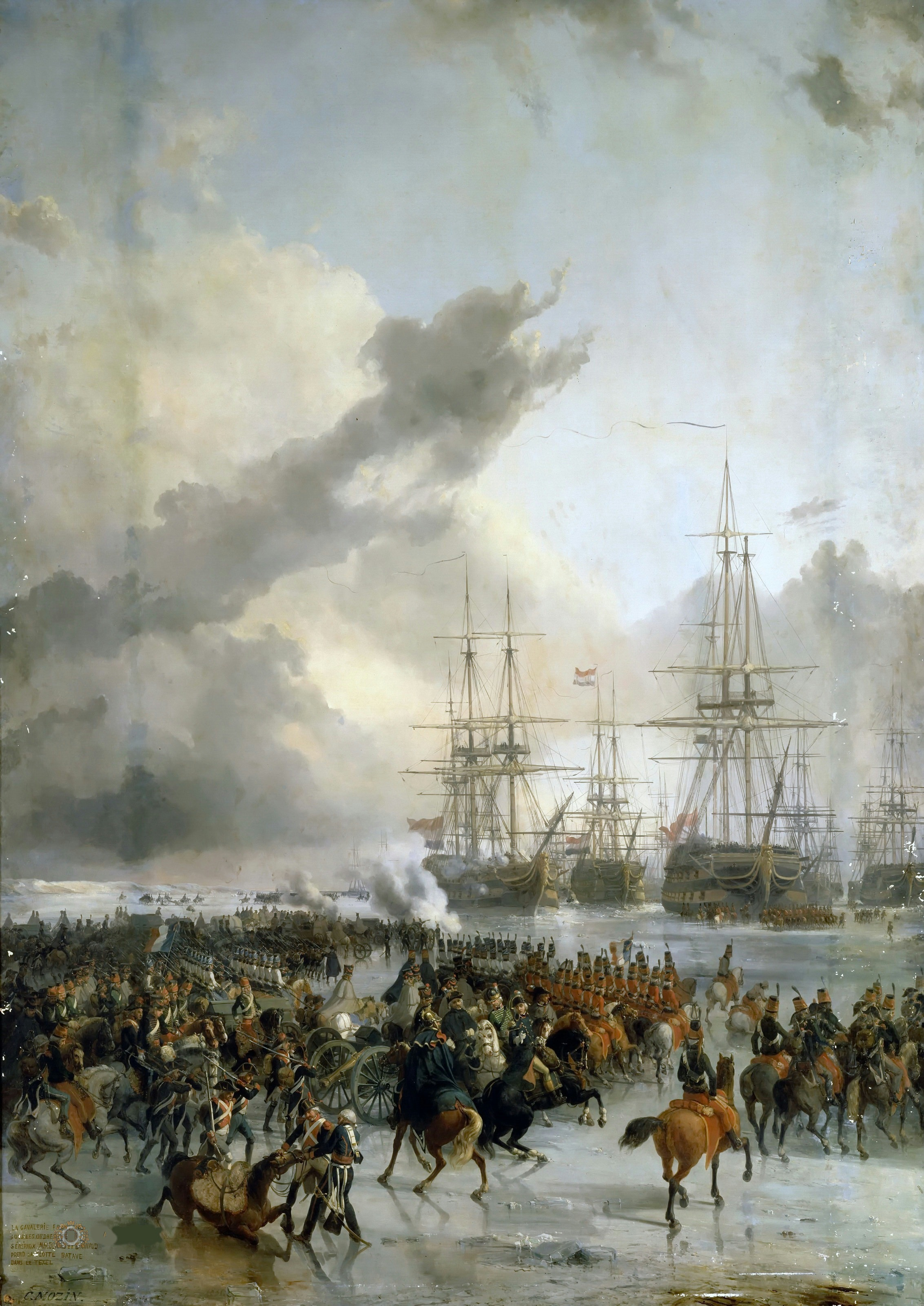
The prize of the Dutch fleet, stopped by ice in the Texel sea in the winter of 1795 (1836)

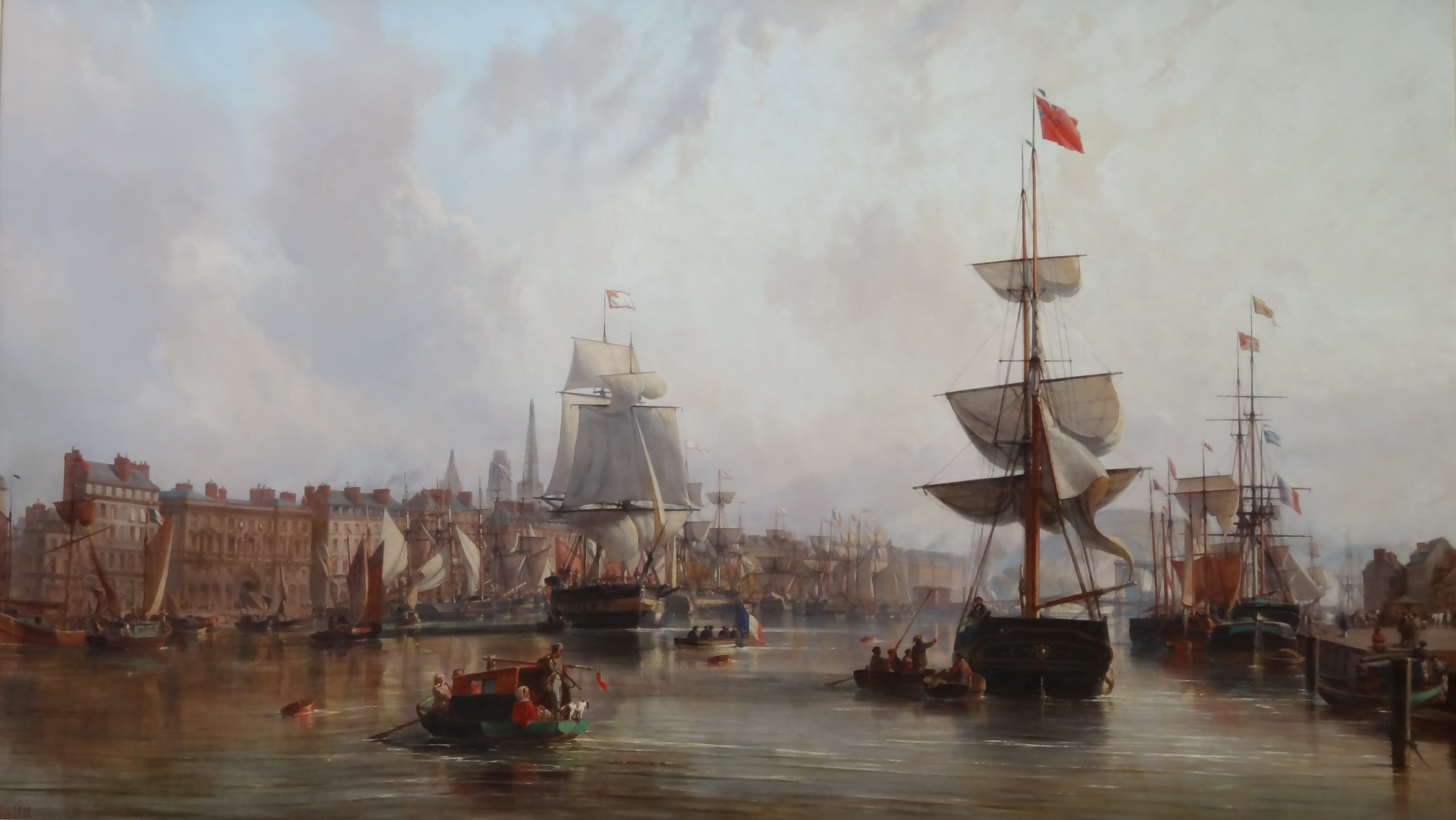
General view of the port of Rouen (1855)

== Public Collections ==
- Castello di Versailles
- Musée de Trouville - Villa Montebello, Trouville-sur-Mer (19 quadri)
- Museo Eugène-Boudin de Honfleur
- Museo marittimo dell'isola Tatihou, Saint-Vaast-la-Hougue
- Musée Carnavalet, Paris
- Musée des Augustins, Tolosa
- Museo d'arte di Tolone
- Museum of modern art André Malraux - MuMa, Le Havre
- Musée des beaux-arts de Rouen
- Castello di Dieppe.
- Museo di Piccardia, Amiens
- Museo di storia della città e della zona di Saint-Malo
- Château de Nemours
- Rijksmuseum, Amsterdam
- Museo Ridder Smidt van Gelder, Antwerp
- Museo di Paisley e Gallerie d'Arte, Paisley, Scotland

== Expositions ==
- 1963: Ville de Trouville Charles Mozin, Paul Huet et les peintres découvreurs de Trouville
- 1988: Musée de Trouville-Villa Montebello (from 28 May to 1 August)
- 1988: Musée Eugène Boudin de Honfleur (from 6 August to 3 October)
- 2018: Musée de Trouville-Villa Montebello (from 23 June to 11 November)

== Bibliography ==
- Charles Mozin. Trouville et ses environs (in French). Paris: R. Lebrasseur. OCLC 458763241.
- Jean Chennebenoist (1962). Trouville et Deauville vus par Charles Mozin (in French). p. 72.
- "peintre méconnu du peuple de la mer". Charles Mozin : 1806-1862 (in French). Douarnenez: Estran. 1981. p. 162. ISBN 2-903707-03-0. OCLC 461903273.
- Michel Catherine (1987). Charles Mozin : peintures (in French). p. 63.
- "Musée de Trouville, 28 mai-1er août 1988, Musée E. Boudin, Honfleur, 6 août-3 octobre 1988". Charles Mozin, 1806-1862 (in French). 1988. p. 116. OCLC 21913147.
- François-Edmond Pâris, Essai sur la construction navale des peuples extra-européens. 2 volumes, texte et atlas de 133 planches OCLC 03211984, su 76 litografie, 57 sono di Charles Mozin.
- Charles Mozin (2018). Catalogue de l'exposition du Musée de Trouville (in French). Cabourg: cahiers du temps. p. 120. ISBN 978-2-35507-107-2.

== Sister projects ==
- Media related to Charles Mozin at Wikimedia Commons
