= Strasbourg Coup =

Attempted French coup of 1836

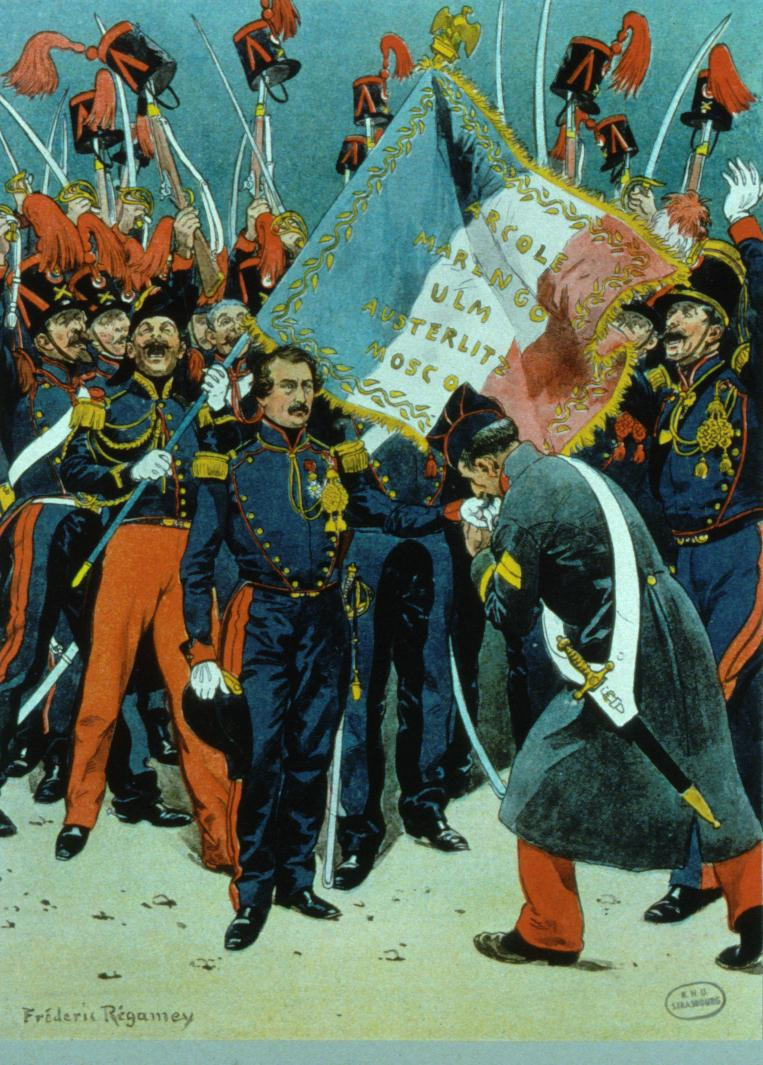
1911 illustration depicting the attempted uprising at the Finkmatt barracks

The Strasbourg Coup (French: Échauffourée de Strasbourg) was an attempted coup d'état launched on the 30th of October, 1836 by Louis Napoleon (later known as Emperor Napoleon III) in the Eastern French city of Strasbourg. The attempt was decisively defeated.

Since the death of Napoleon's son Napoleon II in Vienna in 1832, Louis Napoleon had proclaimed himself the heir to his uncle and leader of the Bonapartist cause. In his planning he was strongly influenced by the dramatic success of Napoleon's return from Elba in 1815 when large swathes of the French Army had defected to him. Based in Switzerland, he had built a network of conspirators in the nearby city of Strasbourg including the colonel of a regiment garrisoned there. He had expected that defecting troops would follow him in a march to Paris to topple the July Monarchy of King Louis Philippe I.

Beginning at dawn on 30 October, the planned uprising collapsed quickly. King Louis Philippe had demanded that the Swiss government return Louis Napoleon to France, but the Swiss pointed out that he was a Swiss soldier and citizen and refused to hand him over. The King responded by sending an army to the Swiss border. Louis Napoleon thanked his Swiss hosts, and voluntarily left the country. The other mutineers were put on trial in Alsace, and were all acquitted.

He returned to Europe and lived in prominent exile in Britain. Following the French Revolution of 1848, Louis Napoleon was elected as President of the Second Republic and the seized power in an 1851 coup, declaring himself as Emperor Napoleon III the following year, which he ruled until 1870.

== Bibliography ==
- Price, Munro. The Perilous Crown: France Between Revolutions, 1814-1848. Pan Macmillan, 2010.
- Simpson, William & Jones, Martin. Europe 1783–1914. Taylor & Francis, 2013.
