= List of shipwrecks in February 1855 =

The list of shipwrecks in February 1855 includes ships sunk, wrecked, grounded, or otherwise lost during February 1855.

== 1 February ==
List of shipwrecks: 1 February 1855
Ship	State	Description
Antelope	United Kingdom	The steamship ran aground on the Northern Bank, off Albany, Colony of Western Australia. She was on a voyage from Melbourne, Victoria to Liverpool, Lancashire. She was refloated on 6 February and resumed her voyage.
Lee	United Kingdom	The schooner was abandoned in the English Channel off Start Point, Devon. Her crew were rescued by Nordlyset (Norway). Lee was taken in to Falmouth, Cornwall on 5 February.
Margaret	United Kingdom	The ship ran aground at Youghal, County Cork. She was on a voyage from Liverpool, Lancashire to Youghal. She was refloated but found to be severely leaky.
Vete	Spain	The schooner was driven ashore and capsized in the River Thames upstream of Southwark Bridge, London. Her eight crew survived.

== 2 February ==
List of shipwrecks: 2 February 1855
Ship	State	Description
Vansittart	United Kingdom	The ship foundered in the Atlantic Ocean off Cape Finisterre, Spain. Her crew were rescued by Adventure (United Kingdom). Vansittart was on a voyage from South Shields, County Durham to Constantinople, Ottoman Empire.
William and Mary	United Kingdom	The brig was abandoned off Great Yarmouth, Norfolk. Her crew were rescued by the Great Yarmouth Lifeboat. William and May was on a voyage from London to Whitby, Yorkshire. She subsequently came ashore at Great Yarmouth.

== 3 February ==
List of shipwrecks: 3 February 1855
Ship	State	Description
Eden	United Kingdom	The brig was driven ashore at Great Yarmouth, Norfolk. Her crew were rescued. She was on a voyage from London to Sunderland, County Durham.
Louisa	Belgium	The schooner was driven ashore and damaged at Holyhead, Anglesey, United Kingdom. She was on a voyage from Antwerp to Liverpool, Lancashire, United Kingdom. She was refloated the next day and taken in to Holyhead.
Lumina	Netherlands	The schooner was wrecked on the Goodwin Sands, Kent, United Kingdom. Her crew were rescued by the Ramsgate Lifeboat. She was on a voyage from Memel, Prussia to Dunkirk, Nord, France.
Marion	United Kingdom	The ship ran aground on the Grain Spit, in the Thames Estuary. She was on a voyage from Sheerness, Kent to London. She was refloated and resumed her voyage.
Secret	United Kingdom	The steamship ran aground at Holyhead. She was on a voyage from Limerick to Holyhead. She was refloated.
Victoria	United Kingdom	The ship was wrecked on Dalkey Island, County Dublin with the loss of two of her crew. She was on a voyage from Glasgow, Renfrewshire to Lisbon, Portugal.
Windsor	United Kingdom	The steamship was reported to have struck the Kish Bank, in the Irish Sea and have been damaged. The report was denied by her owners, the City of Dublin Steam Packet Company.

== 4 February ==
List of shipwrecks: 4 February 1855
Ship	State	Description
Eden	United Kingdom	The brig was driven ashore at Gorleston, Suffolk. Her crew were rescued.
Ludlow	United Kingdom	The ship was driven ashore and wrecked at Punto Bianco, near Agrigento, Sicily. Her crew were rescued. She was on a voyage from Sunderland, County Durham to Malta.
Mary Ellen	United Kingdom	The ship was driven ashore at Punta Mala, Spain. She was on a voyage from Licata, Sicily to London. She was refloated and put in to Gibraltar.

== 5 February ==
List of shipwrecks: 5 February 1855
Ship	State	Description
Eliza	United Kingdom	The schooner foundered in Gerrans Bay.
Icarus	United Kingdom	The ship was driven ashore and wrecked at Conil, Spain with the loss of six of the ten people on board. She was on a voyage from Cardiff, Glamorgan to Gibraltar.
Northam	United Kingdom	The ship sprang a leak and was beached at the mouth of the Rhône. She was on a voyage from London to Marseille, Bouches-du-Rhône, France.
William and Mary	United Kingdom	The ship was driven ashore at Great Yarmouth, Norfolk. Her crew were rescued by the Great Yarmouth Lifeboat.

== 6 February ==
List of shipwrecks: 6 February 1855
Ship	State	Description
Citizen	United Kingdom	The brig ran aground on the Andrews Shoal, in the North Sea off the coast of Suffolk. She was refloated and taken in to Harwich, Essex in a leaky condition.
Jane Dunn	United Kingdom	The brig was in collision with another vessel and was abandoned in the North Sea off Sheringham, Norfolk. She came ashore at Sheringham.
Johanne	(Free City of Danzig) Danzig}	The ship was abandoned in ice off Store Heddinge, Denmark. She was on a voyage from Danzig to Liverpool, Lancashire, United Kingdom.
Providence	(Free City of Danzig) Danzig	The barque sprang a leak and foundered in the Atlantic Ocean (48°35′N 6°35′W). Her crew were rescued by Saggitarius (United Kingdom). Providence was on a voyage from Cardiff, Glamorgan, United Kingdom to Gibraltar.
Seaman	United States	The Baltimore clipper was struck by lightning and destroyed by fire in the Atlantic Ocean. Her crew were rescued by the brig Marion (Flag unknown). Seaman was on a voyage from New Orleans, Louisiana to Marseille, Bouches-du-Rhône, France.
Tucker	United Kingdom	The brig was driven ashore at Bideford, Devon. She was on a voyage from London to Bristol, Gloucestershire.

== 7 February ==
List of shipwrecks: 7 February 1855
Ship	State	Description
Costello	United Kingdom	The ship was driven ashore at Jérémie, Haiti.
Lisbon	United Kingdom	The ship was driven ashore and wrecked on the North Cachapo with the loss of all but one of her crew. She was on a voyage from Lisbon, Portugal to Liverpool, Lancashire.
Victory	United States	The barque sprang a leak and foundered in the Atlantic Ocean (19°30′N 63°00′W). All on board took to two boats. Five crew in one boat were rescued on 10 February by the brig New Era (United Kingdom); those in the longboat were presumed lost. Victory was on a voyage from New York to Saint Thomas, Virgin Islands.

== 8 February ==
List of shipwrecks: 8 February 1855
Ship	State	Description
Hermann	Rostock	The schooner was wrecked near Kessingland, Suffolk, United Kingdom. Her eight crew were rescued by the Pakefield Lifeboat.
Victory	United Kingdom	The ship was driven ashore and severely damaged in Porlock Bay. She was on a voyage from Bristol, Gloucestershire to Africa. She was refloated on 19 February and towed in to Bristol.

== 9 February ==
List of shipwrecks: 9 February 1855
Ship	State	Description
Baron de Brock	United Kingdom	The ship was driven ashore at the Europe Battery, Ottoman Empire. She was on a voyage from Cardiff, Glamorgan to Constantinople, Ottoman Empire. She was later refloated and completed her voyage, arriving on 19 February.
Cambridge	United Kingdom	The barque was in collision with the schooner Merton (United Kingdom) in Mount's Bay and was consequently beached. Her crew were rescued. Cambridge was on a voyage from Swansea, Glamorgan to Arundel, Sussex. She was declared a total loss.
Galatea	United Kingdom	The brig was driven ashore at Portrane, County Dublin. She was on a voyage from Liverpool, Lancashire to Smyrna, Ottoman Empire. She was refloated on 19 February and towed in to Ringsend, County Dublin.
Guardian	United Kingdom	The ship was wrecked at the mouth of the Rio Grande.
Intrepid	(United Kingdom of Great Britain and Ireland) British North America	The ship was driven ashore at Burnt Head, Newfoundland. Two of her crew were reported missing, four died. She was on a voyage from Harbour Grace, Newfoundland to Liverpool, Lancashire. She was refloated and towed in to Brigus, Newfoundland.
Will o' the Wisp	United Kingdom	The steamship was wrecked on Lambay Island, County Dublin with the loss of all twelve crew. She was on a voyage from Maryport, Cumberland to Dublin.

== 10 February ==
List of shipwrecks: 10 February 1855
Ship	State	Description
Diana	United Kingdom	The ship was driven ashore and wrecked at Penzance, Cornwall with the loss of a crew member. She was on a voyage from Swansea, Glamorgan to Southampton, Hampshire.
Jessie	United Kingdom	The ship struck rocks at Negro Point, in the Dardanelles and foundered. Her crew were rescued by Crimea (United Kingdom). Jessie was on a voyage from Liverpool, Lancashire to Constantinople, Ottoman Empire.

== 11 February ==
List of shipwrecks: 11 February 1855
Ship	State	Description
Joshua and Mary	United Kingdom	The ship was driven ashore at Grande-Suline, Haiti. She was refloated.
Nord Stjernen	Sweden	The ship ran aground on the Horse Sand, in the Solent. She was refloated and taken in to Cowes, Isle of Wight, United Kingdom in a leaky condition.
Samuel	United Kingdom	The ship was severely damaged by fire at Birkenhead, Cheshire.

== 12 February ==
List of shipwrecks: 12 February 1855
Ship	State	Description
Anne	United Kingdom	The ship was driven ashore south of Arklow, County Wicklow.
Caroline	Denmark	The ship was wrecked 15 nautical miles (28 km) south of Bridlington, Yorkshire, United Kingdom. Her crew were rescued. She was on a voyage from Liverpool, Lancashire, United Kingdom to Aalborg.
Centurion	United Kingdom	The ship was driven ashore in New York Bay. She was on a voyage from Liverpool to New York, United States. She was refloated.
Contest	United Kingdom	The sloop was in collision with the brigantine Chimera (United Kingdom) and sank off the Eddystone Lighthouse. Her crew were rescued by Chimera.
Lady Brougham	United Kingdom	The schooner was driven ashore at Abersoch, Caernarfonshire. She was refloated on 21 February and taken in to Abersoch.
Petrel	United Kingdom	The steamship was destroyed by fire at Bône, Algeria.
Tage	French Navy	The Hercule-class ship of the line ran aground in the Kamiesch. She was refloated.

== 13 February ==
List of shipwrecks: 13 February 1855
Ship	State	Description
Dvenadsat Apostolov	Imperial Russian Navy	Crimean War, Siege of Sevastopol: The first-rate was scuttled as a blockship at Sevastopol.
Kagul	Imperial Russian Navy	Crimean War, Siege of Sevastopol: 44-gun frigate was scuttled as a blockship at Sevastopol.
Mesemvriya	Imperial Russian Navy	Crimean War, Siege of Sevastopol: 60-gun frigate was scuttled as a blockship at Sevastopol.
Rostislav	Imperial Russian Navy	Crimean War, Siege of Sevastopol: The third rate was scuttled as a blockship at Sevastopol.
Sviatoslav	Imperial Russian Navy	Crimean War, Siege of Sevastopol: 84-gun Sultan Makhmud-class ship of the line was scuttled as a blockship at Sevastopol.
Waterwitch	United Kingdom	The smack was driven ashore and wrecked at Beach Point, Essex.
Zapnath Pancah	India	The ship foundered in the Indian Ocean west of Colombo, Ceylon with the loss of sixteen lives.

== 14 February ==
List of shipwrecks: 14 February 1855
Ship	State	Description
Blythewood	United Kingdom	The ship was driven ashore and wrecked near Boston, Massachusetts. She was on a voyage from Philadelphia, Pennsylvania to Saint Domingo.
Eaglet	United Kingdom	The ship struck a sunken rock and was wrecked off Terceira Island, Azores.
Emma	(United Kingdom of Great Britain and Ireland) Guernsey	The brig ran aground on the Kimmeridge Ledge, in the English Channel off the coast of Dorset. She was on a voyage from Guernsey to London. She was refloated and taken in to Weymouth, Dorset in a leaky condition.

== 15 February ==
List of shipwrecks: 15 February 1855
Ship	State	Description
Anna	United Kingdom	The ship ran aground on the South Bull, in the Irish Sea. She was on a voyage from Drogheda, County Louth to Liverpool, Lancashire. She was refloated and resumed her voyage.
Ann Moore	United Kingdom	The brig was wrecked on the Corton Sands, Suffolk with the loss of two of her crew. She was on a voyage from South Shields, County Durham to London. Survivors were rescued by the Gorleston yawl Breeze (United Kingdom).
Guiding Star	United Kingdom	The ship was last sighted in the South Atlantic Ocean (16°06′S 33°48′W). She was on a voyage from Liverpool, Lancashire to Melbourne, Victoria. No further trace, presumed foundered with the loss of all 543 people on board.
Iron Age	United Kingdom	The ship was wrecked at Cape Northumberland, South Australia. All on board were rescued. She was on a voyage from an English port to Portland Bay and Port Fairy, Victoria.
Jersey Lass	(United Kingdom of Great Britain and Ireland) Jersey	The ship was abandoned in the Atlantic Ocean. Her crew were rescued. She was on a voyage from Montevideo, Uruguay to Falmouth, Cornwall.
Lumsden	United Kingdom	The ship was wrecked on the Corton Sands. Her crew were rescued by Ardwick (United Kingdom). Lumsdenwas on a voyage from South Shields, County Durham to London.
Sémillante	French Navy	Crimean War: The Surveillante-class frigate, in use as a troopship, was wrecked on Île Lavezzi, Corsica, with the loss of all 693 people on board.

== 16 February ==
List of shipwrecks: 16 February 1855
Ship	State	Description
Caroline	United Kingdom	The brig struck the pier and was damaged at Margate, Kent.
Defender	United Kingdom	The barque ran aground on the Gunfleet Sand, in the North Sea off the coast of Essex. She was on a voyage from Newcastle upon Tyne, Northumberland to London. She was refloated with the assistance of the smacks Concord and Louisa (both United Kingdom) and taken in to Harwich, Essex.
European	United Kingdom	The steamship ran aground on Cooper's Rock, off the coast of Argyllshire. She was refloated and beached.
Irene	United Kingdom	The ship was driven ashore near Youghal, County Cork.
Mauritius	United Kingdom	The steamship was severely damaged by fire and explosion while in dry dock at Southampton, Hampshire, and became a total loss.
New Fame	United Kingdom	The ship foundered off the Old Head of Kinsale, County Cork with the loss of all hands.
Nimrod	United Kingdom	The schooner was driven ashore at Plymouth, Devon.
Rotherham	United Kingdom	The collier, a schooner, ran aground off Harwich. She was then run into by another schooner and damaged.
Scotsman	United Kingdom	The brig collided with a schooner and sank in the North Sea off the Farne Islands, Northumberland. Her crew survived. She was on a voyage from Kirkcaldy, Fife to Newcastle upon Tyne, Northumberland. The schooner also sank.

== 17 February ==
List of shipwrecks: 17 February 1855
Ship	State	Description
Ada	United Kingdom	The ship was driven ashore and wrecked south of Sunderland, County Durham.
Alice	United Kingdom	The clipper departed from Saint John, New Brunswick, British North America for Liverpool, Lancashire. No further trace, presumed foundered with the loss of all hands.
Bessie	United Kingdom	The ship was holed by ice in the Potomac River. She was on a voyage from Liverpool to Alexandria, New York, United States.
Celerity	United Kingdom	The ship ran aground on the Pye Sand, in the North Sea off the coast of Essex. She was refloated and taken in to the Handford Water.
Ernest	United Kingdom	The ship was driven ashore at the mouth of the Lay. She was on a voyage from Swansea, Glamorgan to Bordeaux, Gironde, France.
Fame	United Kingdom	The ship was driven ashore at Dunkirk, Nord, France.
Hope	United Kingdom	The ship was driven ashore at Harwich, Essex. She was refloated.
Susannah	United Kingdom	The brig ran aground at Sunderland and was severely damaged.
Zior	United Kingdom	The ship ran aground on the Owers Rocks, in the English Channel off the coast of Sussex. She was on a voyage from Havre de Grâce, Seine-Inférieure, France to Hartlepool, County Durham. She was refloated and taken in to Portsmouth, Hampshire.

== 18 February ==
List of shipwrecks: 18 February 1855
Ship	State	Description
Ann and Isabella	United Kingdom	The schooner ran aground 3 nautical miles (5.6 km) north of Sunderland, County Durham. She was refloated and towed back to Sunderland in a severely damaged condition.
Choice	United Kingdom	The barque was driven ashore at Ballycotton, County Cork. She was refloated in late April and towed in to Cork for repairs.
Countess of Arran	United Kingdom	The ship was lost in the Skellig Islands, County Kerry. Her crew survived. She was on a voyage from Liverpool, Lancashire to constantinople, Ottoman Empire.
Czar	United Kingdom	The ship ran aground on the Boulder Sandbank. She was on a voyage from Havre de Grâce, Seine-Inférieure, France to Hartlepool. She was refloated and put in to Portsmouth, Hampshire.
D'Auvergne	(United Kingdom of Great Britain and Ireland) Jersey	The ship was driven into the brig Hilda (United Kingdom) and then driven ashore at Plymouth, Devon.
Jane	United Kingdom	The ship was driven ashore and damaged in the Isles of Scilly. She was on a voyage from Bristol, Gloucestershire to Plymouth. She was refloated on 20 February.
James Duff	United Kingdom	The schooner ran aground on the Pye Sand, in the North Sea on the coast of Essex. She was refloated and found to be in a leaky condition. The ship was beached in Hanford Water. She was refloated on 21 February and towed in to Harwich, Essex.
Triton	United Kingdom	The brig was driven ashore at Landguard Point, Essex.
William Tucker	United Kingdom	The brig was abandoned in ice off St. John's, Newfoundland, British North America. She was on a voyage from Plymouth to St. John's. She was taken in to St. John's on 6 March.
Zodiacus	Hamburg	The brig was abandoned in ice off St. John's. She was on a voyage from Hamburg to St. John's. She was taken in to St. John's on 6 March.

== 19 February ==
List of shipwrecks: 19 February 1855
Ship	State	Description
Nostra Señora de Begona	Spain	The ship was abandoned in the Atlantic Ocean. Her crew were rescued by Governor (United Kingdom). Nostra Señora de Begona was on a voyage from Havana, Cuba to Queenstown, County Cork, United Kingdom.
Sunbeam	United Kingdom	The brig was driven ashore at Blakeney, Norfolk. She was on a voyage from Newcastle upon Tyne, Northumberland to Cartagena, Spain. She had been refloated by 6 April and taken in to Whitby, Yorkshire for repairs.

== 20 February ==
List of shipwrecks: 20 February 1855
Ship	State	Description
Alma	United Kingdom	The ship foundered in the Atlantic Ocean off Cape Vilan, Spain. Her crew survived. She was on a voyage from Cardiff, Glamorgan to Gibraltar.
Ann Moore, and Colin Campbell	United Kingdom	The schooner Ann Moore was driven from her mooring at Wapping, Middlesex by ice. She was driven into the brig Colin Campbell, which also broke free. Both vessels were driven upstream, damaging a building and sinking a number of lighters. They then drove downstream. Both vessels were severely damaged.
Good Design	United Kingdom	The ship was driven ashore at Great Yarmouth, Norfolk.
Hiram	United Kingdom	The schooner foundered in the Bay of Biscay. Her crew were rescued by Œder (flag unknown). Hiram was on a voyage from Cardiff, Glamorgan to Gibraltar.
Jessie Munn	United Kingdom	The ship ran aground on the Cochenos Rocks, on the coast of Spain. She was on a voyage from Mobile, Alabama, United States to Cádiz, Spain. She was refloated the next day and towed in to Cádiz.
Petrel	United Kingdom	The ship was destroyed by fire at Algiers, Algeria.
Richard Reynolds	United Kingdom	The brig ran aground on the Goodwin Sands, Kent. All but two of her crew took to the longboat and were later rescued by the Ramsgate Lifeboat. Richard Reynolds was on a voyage from South Shields, County Durham to Genoa, Kingdom of Sardinia. She was refloated and taken in to Ramsgate, Kent in a severely damaged condition.
Triton	United Kingdom	The schooner was abandoned in the Atlantic Ocean (48°30′N 10°30′W). Her crew were rescued by Marie Louise (France) before she foundered. Triton was on a voyage from Agrigento, Sicily to Newcastle upon Tyne, Northumberland.
Witch of the Wind	(United Kingdom of Great Britain and Ireland) British North America	The ship was abandoned in the Atlantic Ocean 20 nautical miles (37 km) south south west of Halifax, Nova Scotia. Her crew were rescued by Snowdon (United Kingdom). Witch of the Wind was on a voyage from Saint John, New Brunswick to Liverpool, Lancashire. She was taken in tow by the steamship Osprey, but the tow had to be abandoned 60 nautical miles (110 km) west of the Sambro Lighthouse, Nova Scotia.
Wentworth, and Water Nymph	United Kingdom	The brig Wentworth was driven from her mooring at Wapping by ice. She drove into Water Nymph (United Kingdom). Both vessels were damaged. Wentworth drove upstream almost to London Bridge before she was secured at Billingsgate, Middlesex. Water Nymph was also driven upstream.
Woodman	United Kingdom	The brig was wrecked on the Shipwash Sand, in the North Sea off the coast of Suffolk. Her eleven crew were rescued by Alfred (United Kingdom). Woodman was on a voyage from Newcastle upon Tyne, Northumberland to London.
Zoe	United Kingdom	The barque foundered in the Bay of Biscay with the loss of a crew member. She was on a voyage from Cardiff, Glamorgan to Smyrna, Ottoman Empire.

== 21 February ==
List of shipwrecks: 21 February 1855
Ship	State	Description
George Guildford	United Kingdom	The ship was abandoned in the Atlantic Ocean. Her crew were rescued by Saucy Lass (United Kingdom). George Guildford was on a voyage from Cardiff, Glamorgan to Constantinople, Ottoman Empire.
Hyderabad	United Kingdom	The ship ran aground on the Rangabullah Lump, in the Hooghly River. She was on a voyage from Calcutta, India to London.

== 22 February ==
List of shipwrecks: 22 February 1855
Ship	State	Description
HMS Calypso	Royal Navy	The Echo-class sloop ran aground on the Diamond Reef, off Antigua. She was refloated the next day.
Good Intent	(United Kingdom of Great Britain and Ireland) British North America	The schooner was crushed by ice and sank at St. John's, Newfoundland. Her crew were rescued.
Tonclin	United Kingdom	The brig was wrecked at Saint Domingo. Her crew were rescued. She was on a voyage from Saint Domingo to London.

== 23 February ==
List of shipwrecks: 23 February 1855
Ship	State	Description
Adriana	United Kingdom	The barque was abandoned in the Atlantic Ocean off Pico Island, Azores. Her crew survived. She was on a voyage from New Calabar to and English port. She was towed in to Porto Praya, Azores in a waterlogged condition.

== 24 February ==
List of shipwrecks: 24 February 1855
Ship	State	Description
Agnes and Emily	United Kingdom	The schooner was driven ashore and wrecked at Cairnbulg, Aberdeenshire.
Eliza	United Kingdom	The ship was driven ashore and damaged at Bootle, Lancashire. She was on a voyage from Workington, Cumberland to Dublin.
Enterprise	United Kingdom	The brig was driven ashore and wrecked at Robin Hoods Bay, Yorkshire. Her crew were rescued. She was on a voyage from London to West Hartlepool, County Durham.
Jane Beale	United Kingdom	The two-masted schooner was abandoned in the English Channel off the French coast. She was discovered on 27 February and towed in to Newhaven, Sussex by the cutters Gulnare and Twins (both United Kingdom. Jane Beale was on a voyage from Guernsey, Channel Islands to London.
Mirage	United Kingdom	The ship ran aground on the Dean Sand, in the Solent. She was on a voyage from Hartlepool, County Durham to Shanghai, China. She was refloated and anchored at Spithead.
Result	United Kingdom	The ship ran aground at Portsmouth, Hampshire and was damaged. She was on a voyage from China to London. She was refloated and taken in to Portsmouth in a leaky condition.

== 25 February ==
List of shipwrecks: 25 February 1855
Ship	State	Description
Doctor	United Kingdom	The schooner was driven ashore north of Boulogne, Pas-de-Calais, France. She was on a voyage from São Miguel Island, Azores to London. She was refloated and put in to The Downs, Kent in a leaky condition.
Ellen	United Kingdom	The ship struck a sunken rock and was abandoned in Bracklesham Bay. Her crew were rescued. She was on a voyage from Falmouth, Cornwall to London.
Emma	United Kingdom	The ship was driven ashore and severely damaged north of Boulogne. She was on a voyage from Waterford to London.
Enterprise	United Kingdom	The ship ran aground on the Codling Bank, in the Irish Sea. she was on a voyage from Dublin to Trinidad. She was refloated and put back to Dublin.
Eva	United States	The ship ran aground on the Riding Rocks, in the Bahamas. She was on a voyage from New Orleans, Louisiana to Trieste. The vessel subsequently caught fire.
Favourite	United Kingdom	The schooner was wrecked on Nash Point, Glamorgan. Her crew were rescued. She was on a voyage from Falmouth to Cardiff, Glamorgan.
Francis Paul	United Kingdom	The ship was abandoned in the Atlantic Ocean due to her cargo having shifted, leaving the ship unmanageable. Her eight crew were rescued by the barque Enterprise, (United Kingdom). Francis Paul was on a voyage from New York to Bristol, Gloucestershire.
George	United Kingdom	The barque was driven ashore east of Dover, Kent. She was refloated and taken in to The Downs.
Helena Thecla	Kingdom of the Two Sicilies	The ship was driven ashore in Doonbeg Bay. She was on a voyage from Palermo to Liverpool, Lancashire, United Kingdom.
Île Dieu Bienfacteur	France	The ship was abandoned at Boulogne.
Lima	United Kingdom	The ship was driven ashore at Boulogne.
Mangosteen	United Kingdom	The barque was wrecked on the coast of Le Portel, Pas-de-Calais, France. Her crew survived. She was on a voyage from Bombay, India to London.
Morna	United Kingdom	The steamship was wrecked off North Bishop Rock, with the loss of 21 lives. She was on a voyage from Belfast, County Antrim to London.
Saint Martin de re Ernest	France	The ship sank at Boulogne.
Scud	United Kingdom	The ship was driven ashore and wrecked at Dover, Kent.
Statira	United Kingdom	The schooner was wrecked at Laugharne, Carmarthenshire with the loss of four of her five crew. She was on a voyage from Devoran, Cornwall to Pembrey, Carmarthenshire.
Susan G. Owens	United Kingdom	The ship was driven ashore on Alcatraz Island, San Francisco, California, United States. She was on a voyage from Liverpool to San Francisco.
Thebis	United Kingdom	The ship foundered in the English Channel off the coast of Pas-de-Calais, France. Her crew were rescued.
Wave	United Kingdom	The ship struck a sunken rock in Carnarvon Bay off Rhoscolyn, Anglesey. She was on a voyage from London to Liverpool. She put in to Holyhead, Anglesey in a leaky condition.
Welcome	United Kingdom	The ship was wrecked at Porthcawl, Glamorgan with the loss of three of her crew. She was on a voyage from Bangor, Caernarfonshire to Bristol, Gloucestershire.
Zephyr	United Kingdom	The ship was wrecked at Boulogne, Pas-de-Calais. Her crew were rescued.

== 26 February ==
List of shipwrecks: 26 February 1855
Ship	State	Description
Avon	United Kingdom	The barque ran aground on Lundy Island, Devon and sank. Her crew survived. She was on a voyage from Cuba to Swansea, Glamorgan.
Maria	United Kingdom	The ship was damaged by fire at Livorno, Grand Duchy of Tuscany.

== 27 February ==
List of shipwrecks: 27 February 1855
Ship	State	Description
Celestial	United Kingdom	The ship was driven ashore between Dover and Folkestone, Kent. She was on a voyage from Shanghai, China to London. She was refloated and resumed her voyage.
Franchise	United States	The ship was driven ashore at Porth Ceiriad, Caernarfonshire, United Kingdom. She was on a voyage from Charleston, South Carolina to Liverpool, Lancashire, United Kingdom. She broke up on 3 March.
William Laytin	United States	The ship was wrecked in the Atlantic Ocean. Her crew were rescued on 4 March by the barque Sylph (United Kingdom). William Laytin was on a voyage from New York to Antwerp, Belgium.

== 28 February ==
List of shipwrecks: 28 February 1855
Ship	State	Description
Assam	United Kingdom	The barque ran aground off Monos, Trinidad. She was refloated but was then wrecked off Huevos. Her crew survived. She was on a voyage from the Clyde to Trinidad.
James Cheston	United States	The full-rigged ship was discovered waterlogged and derelict in the Atlantic Ocean by Marathon (United Kingdom). It was discovered that an attempt at barratry had been made, as three holes had been bored in the ship above the waterline by her captain and mates. The ship had been abandoned. Some of her crew were rescued by Two Friends (United Kingdom); all of them survived. James Cheston was pumped dry and eleven men were put aboard her. They took her in to Liverpool, Lancashire, United Kingdom. James Cheston had been on a voyage from Baltimore, Maryland to London, United Kingdom.
Mary Queen of Scots	United Kingdom	The ship was wrecked at Port Gregory, Swan River Colony.
Siren	United Kingdom	The barque foundered in the Bay of Biscay. Her crew were rescued by the brig Cette (Sweden). Siren was on a voyage from Newcastle upon Tyne, Northumberland to Constantinople, Ottoman Empire.
Traveller	United Kingdom	The ship was driven ashore at South Foreland, Kent. She was on a voyage from Liverpool, Lancashire to Rotterdam, South Holland, Netherlands.

== Unknown date ==
List of shipwrecks: Unknown date in February 1855
Ship	State	Description
Aguila	United Kingdom	The schooner ran aground at Aberdovey, Merionethshire. She was refloated on 4 February.
HNLMS Borneo	Royal Netherlands Navy	The steamship struck a sunken rock off Indramayu, Netherlands East Indies after 15 February and was severely damaged. She was towed by HNLMS Etna (Royal Netherlands Navy) to Onrust Island for repairs.
Culloden	United Kingdom	The ship was driven ashore in Cardigan Bay. She was refloated on 19 February and towed in to Caernarfon.
Edith	United Kingdom	The barque foundered in the Atlantic Ocean before 4 February. Her crew were rescued by the brig Diadem (Sweden). Edith was on a voyage from South Shields, County Durham to Rio de Janeiro, Brazil.
Eglinton	United Kingdom	The ship foundered in the Irish Sea off the coast of County Wicklow. All hands presumed lost.
Francis	United Kingdom	The ship was wrecked 20 nautical miles (37 km) north of Bahia, Brazil. Her crew were rescued.
Innocence	United Kingdom	The ship foundered in the Atlantic Ocean in early February. Her crew were rescued. She was on a voyage from Bahia, Brazil to Cowes, Isle of Wight.
Laurel	United Kingdom	The full-rigged ship was driven ashore and wrecked at Sidmouth, Devon before 4 February.
Margaret Mitchell	United Kingdom	The ship ran aground in the Woosung River. She was later refloated and taken in to Shanghai, China. She was consequently condemned.
Pilgrim	United States	The ship was abandoned in the Atlantic Ocean in mid-February. Her crew were rescued by Ellen (United Kingdom). Pilgri was on a voyage from Baltimore, Maryland to Schiedam, South Holland, Netherlands.
Prince of Wales	United Kingdom	The ship foundered in the North Sea off the coast of County Durham before 14 February.
Priscilla	United Kingdom	The sloop ran aground at Aberdovey. She was refloated on 4 February.
Sea	United Kingdom	The schooner was in collision with another vessel on or before 2 February. She was abandoned in the English Channel between 2 and 6 February. She was taken in to Falmouth on 6 February by Goddess (United Kingdom).
War Eagle	United Kingdom	The ship was driven ashore on Campobello Island, New Brunswick, British North America in early February. She was on a voyage from Saint John, New Brunswick to Liverpool. She was refloated and put back to Saint John in a leaky condition.
Zapaanath Paniah	(United Kingdom of Great Britain and Ireland) Ceylon	The ship foundered 40 nautical miles (74 km) off Colombo with the loss of sixteen of her 24 crew She was on a voyage from Madras, India to Colombo.
