= Cavallo (island) =

French island in the Mediterranean Sea between Corsica and Sardinia

Coordinates: 41°22′6″N 9°15′44″E

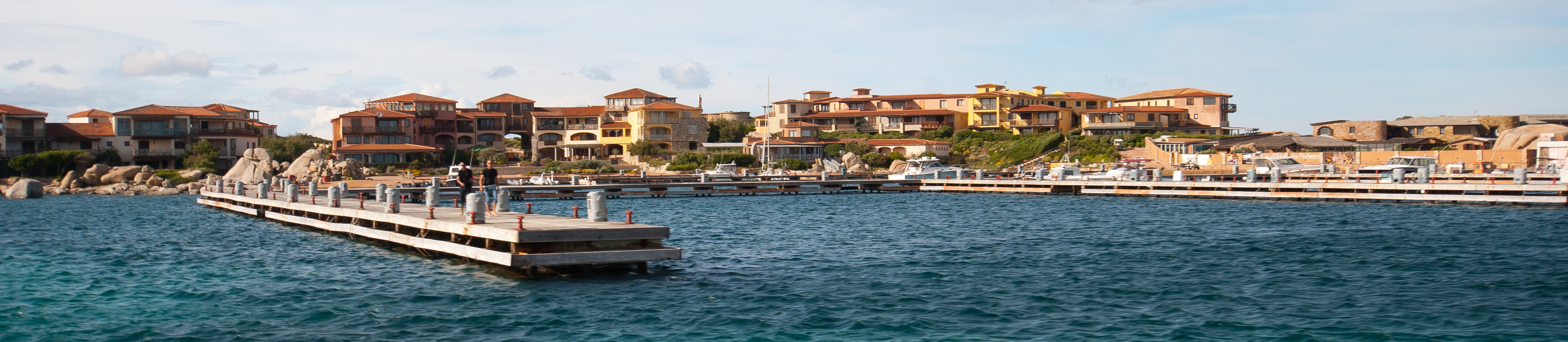

Cavallo (Corsican: Isula di Cavaddu; Bonifacian dialect: Isula Cavaddu) is a small island in the Mediterranean Sea located between Corsica and Sardinia. Cavallo is the southernmost inhabited territory of metropolitan France and part of the commune of Bonifacio, Corsica.

== Geography ==
Cavallo is the only inhabited island of the Lavezzi archipelago, 2.3 km from the Corsican coast, close to the Strait of Bonifacio. It is about 13 km from Sardinia. The island is French territory, though it belonged to Italy in the past. Cavallo Island is about 120 hectares in area and its highest point is 32 metres above sea level. It has a small port.

== History ==
Cavallo has a long history, beginning when Ancient Rome sent prisoners there to cut granite for monuments. The island was abandoned during Augustus’ empire, and remained uninhabited until a shepherd settled there with his flock in 1800. The deep sea surrounding the island hid dangerous obstacles for navigators, earning the island the nickname “The Cursed Siren.” In 1855 the French frigate Semillante which was transporting soldiers to Crimea sank nearby and all 693 on board were lost at sea. In 1978 Cavallo made international news when it was the scene of a shooting committed by Vittorio Emanuele di Savoia.

== Tourism ==
Cavallo is mostly privately owned, but does allow limited access to outsiders. The coastline ownership and access to beaches is unclear although normally, as in the rest of France, open to public. Known for sailing, there is also a commercial area with a restaurant and a shop, along with the luxury Hotel & Spa des Pêcheurs. Only bicycles and electric cars are allowed on the island.
