= French ship Belle Poule =

Four ships of the French Navy have borne the name Belle Poule.

== Ships ==
The ships are:

- the 36-gun frigate Belle Poule (1766), famous for her duel against the English frigate HMS Arethusa on 17 June 1778, which started the French intervention in the American War of Independence; the British 64-gun ship of the line HMS Nonsuch captured her in 1780 and she was broken up in 1801.
- the 40-gun frigate Belle Poule (1802–1806), which acted as a commerce raider in the Indian Ocean until the British captured her in 1806
- the 60-gun frigate Belle Poule (1828–1888), famous for bringing back the remains of Napoléon from Saint Helena to France in 1840; she was under command of François d'Orléans, Prince of Joinville, and was painted black for the mission
- The modern schooner Belle Poule, training ship of the Naval Academy, whose actions with the Free French Forces during the Second World War are commemorated by her bearing a French flag with the Croix de Lorraine.

== Name ==
The name Belle Poule derives from an incident in 1533. Francis I was presented with the keys of Toulouse by Paule de Viguier, the baroness Fronteville. Paule was a young girl known for her beauty, and Francis nicknamed her la belle Paule. The name became altered over time to belle poule through the difference between French and Occitan pronunciation. The name was later adopted by a Gironde corsair for his vessel, giving rise to it as a ship name in the French navy.

Another version of the story is that Francis called her belle poule, as a play on words. The word belle is "beautiful", while poule is a reference to her name, Paule, but also means "chick", which in French, as it was later in English, can refer to a young girl.
