= French frigate Belle Poule (1834) =

1834 frigate of the French Navy

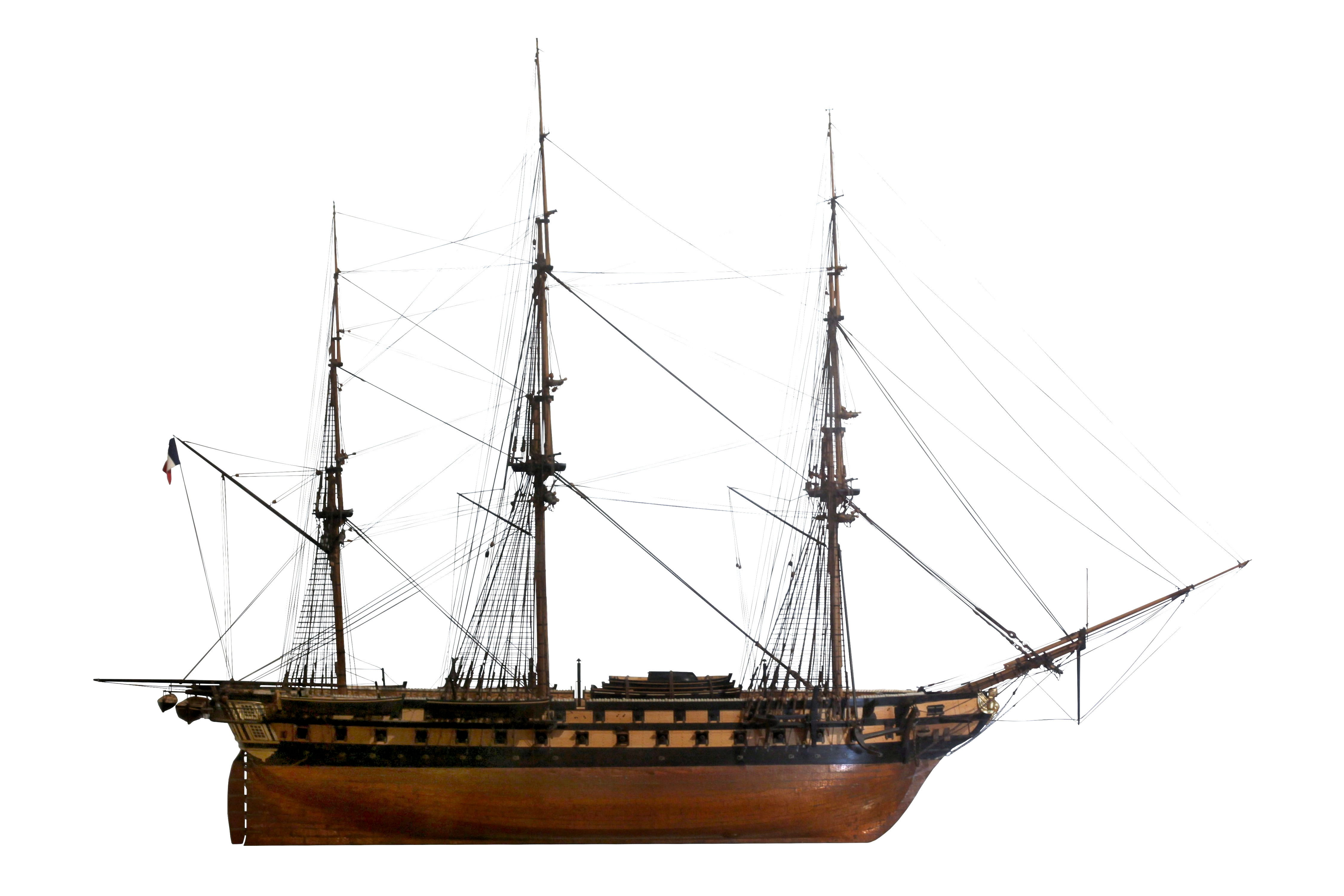
- Model of Belle Poule, on display at Toulon naval museum.

History

France
- Namesake: Paule de Viguier, baronne de Fonterville
- Laid down: 1828
- Launched: 26 March 1834
- Commissioned: July 1835
- Decommissioned: 19 March 1861
- Fate: Scrapped 1888

General characteristics
- Class & type: Surveillante-class frigate
- Displacement: 2500 tonnes
- Length: 54 metres (177 ft)
- Beam: 14.10 metres (46.3 ft)
- Draught: 3.80 metres (12.5 ft)
- Propulsion: sail
- Complement: 301
- Armament: 60 guns; 32 × 30-pounder long guns; 4 × 80-pounder Paixhans guns; 24 × 30-pounder carronades
- Armour: Timber

Belle Poule was a Surveillante-class 60-gun first rank frigate of the French Navy. She achieved fame for bringing the remains of Napoleon from Saint Helena back to France, in what became known as the Retour des cendres.

== Career ==
=== Construction and early career ===
Although construction was started in 1828, Belle Poule was launched only in 1834. She was one of the first ships to be built in a covered shipyard, which allowed the builders to delay construction while the political and financial circumstances were not favourable. Her design was inspired by USS Constitution. She was commissioned in July 1835, and displayed very good sailing properties.

On 1 August 1839, under command of the Prince of Joinville, third son of King Louis-Philippe, she left Cherbourg to join the Eastern fleet of Admiral Lalande. In October, she ran aground on the Taches Blanches, in the Dardanelles and was damaged. She was refloated and taken into Constantinople, Ottoman Empire for temporary repairs before sailing to Toulon for permanent repairs.

=== Retour des cendres ===
On 27 July 1840, she set sail with special equipment for Saint Helena to bring back the remains of Napoleon. She had been painted black for the occasion. On 30 September, she arrived back in Cherbourg, where, on 8 December, the Emperor's remains were transferred to the steamship Normandie. Normandie transported the remains to Le Havre and up the Seine to Rouen, for further transport to Paris.

The transfer of the remains from Belle Poule to Normandie in the road of Cherbourg was executed in much ceremony, and became a subject of choice for marine and romantic painters.

Representations of the transfer of the remains from Belle-Poule to Normandie in the road of Cherbourg
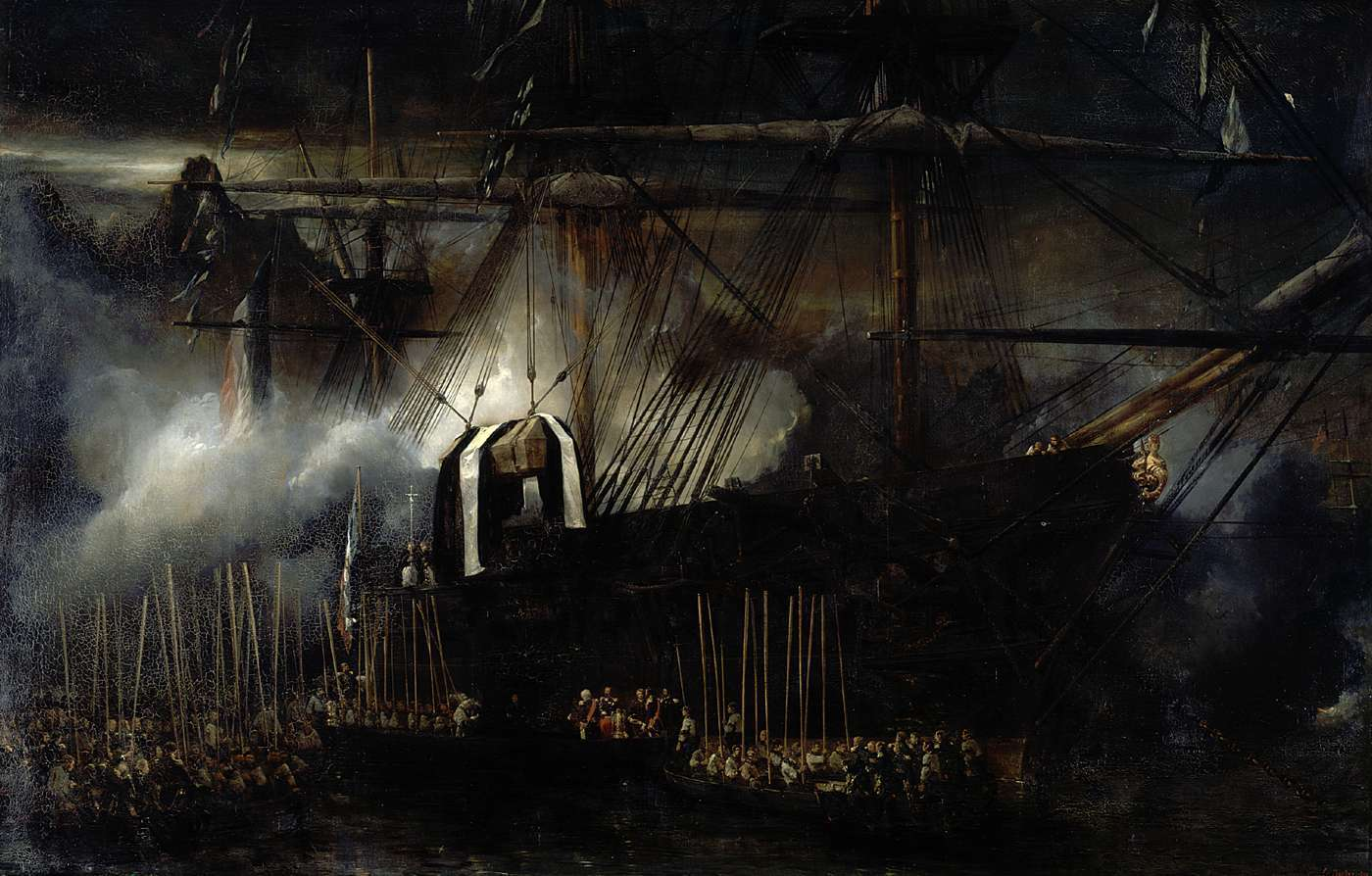
The Return of Napoleonby Eugène Isabey, 1842

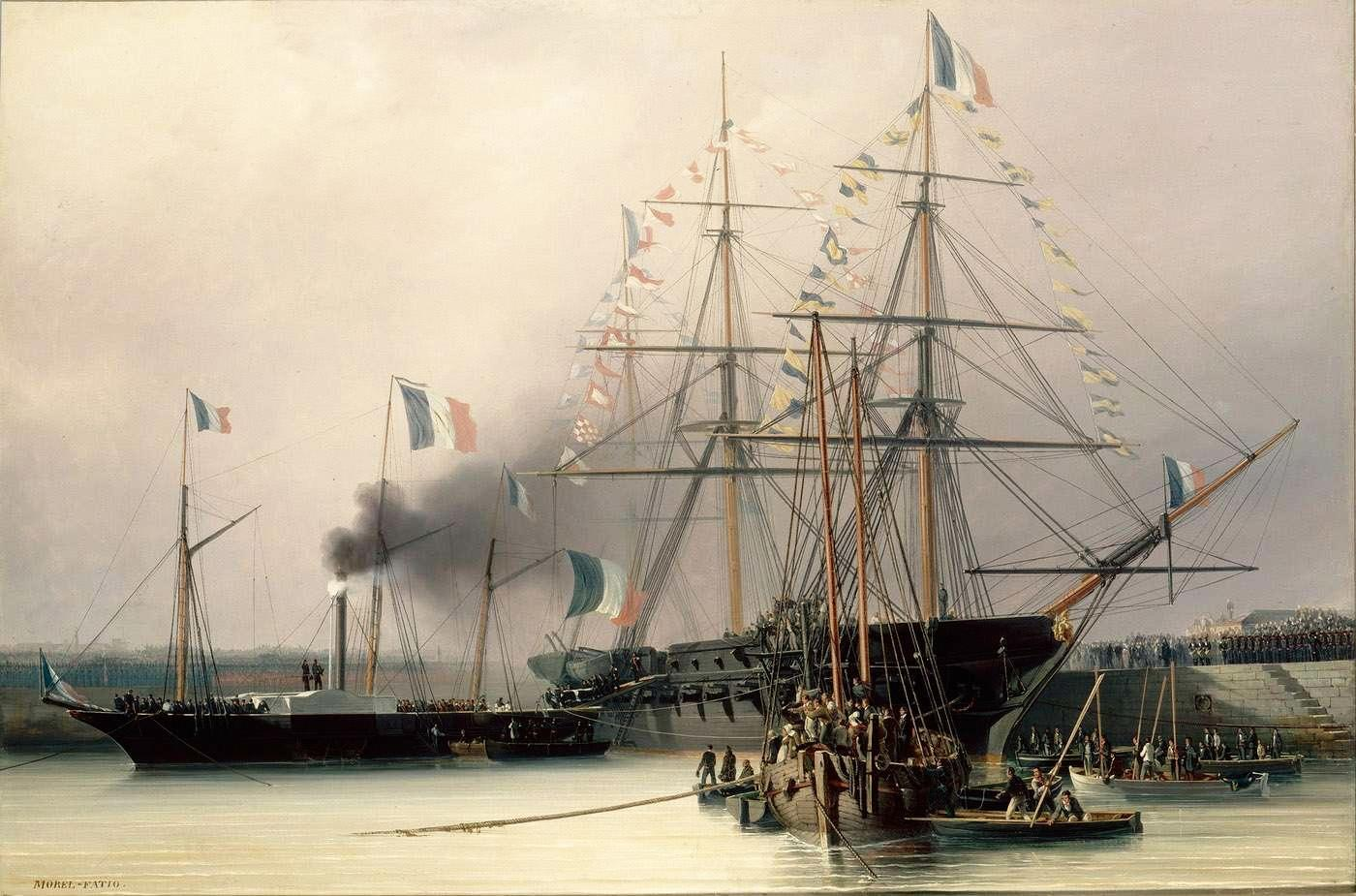
Depiction by Antoine Léon Morel-Fatio

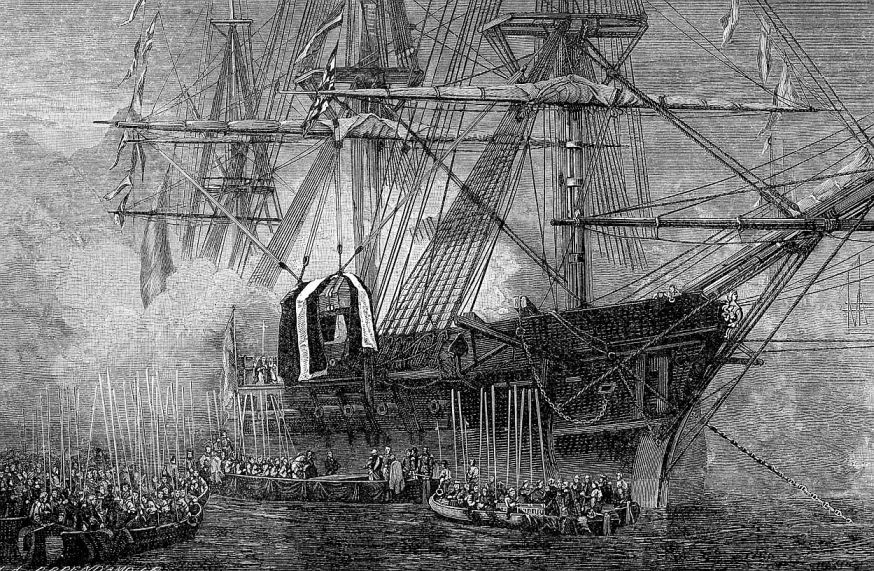
Depiction by Skelton

=== Canada and Morocco ===
In 1841, Belle Poule cruised along the Canadian coast, landing in Halifax, Nova Scotia and visited New York City, where the Prince of Joinville visited the President of the United States. Belle Poule was back in Toulon on 14 July 1842.

In 1844, Joinville, then vice-admiral, was sent to Morocco to support the action of General Thomas Robert Bugeaud in Algeria, with Suffren, Jemmapes, Triton, and the frigate Belle Poule. Tanger came under attack on 6 August, and Mogador was taken on 15 August.

Afterwards, Belle Poule cruised the Indian Ocean, where a cyclone left her with serious damage. She was repaired in Sainte-Marie de Madagascar, and returned to Brest.

=== Crimean War and late career ===
She took part in the Crimean War, mostly as a transport; she stayed in the East until August 1856, and sailed back to Toulon on 1 September.

In 1859, she was used to transport ammunition, and was decommissioned on 19 March 1861. She was still used to store gunpowder until 1888.

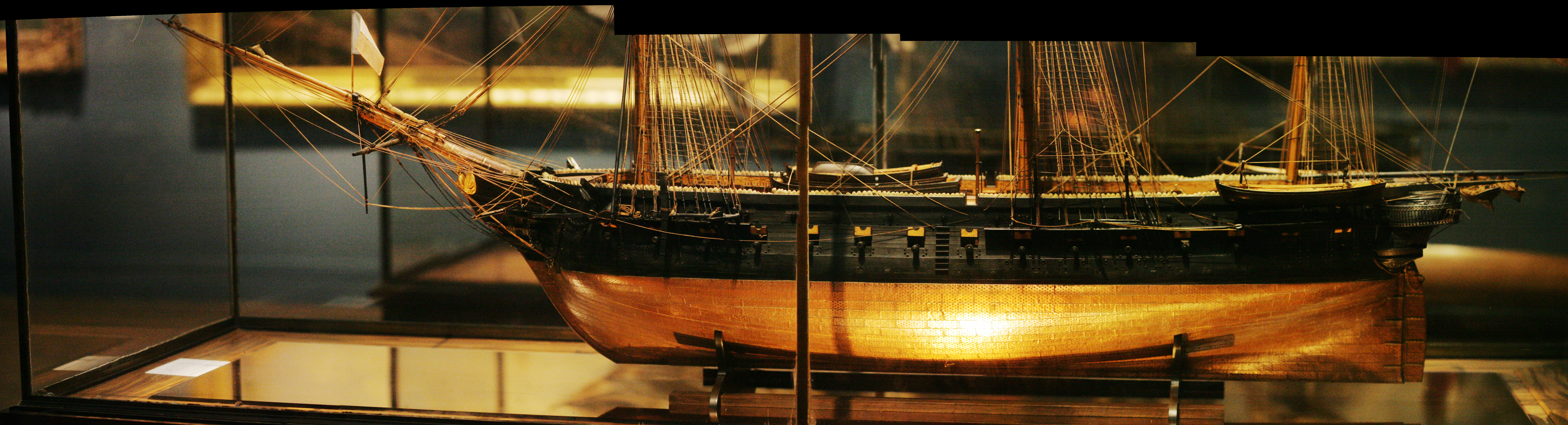
Model on display at the Musée de la Marine in Paris
