= Ship camel =

System of external flotation to raise a ship in the water

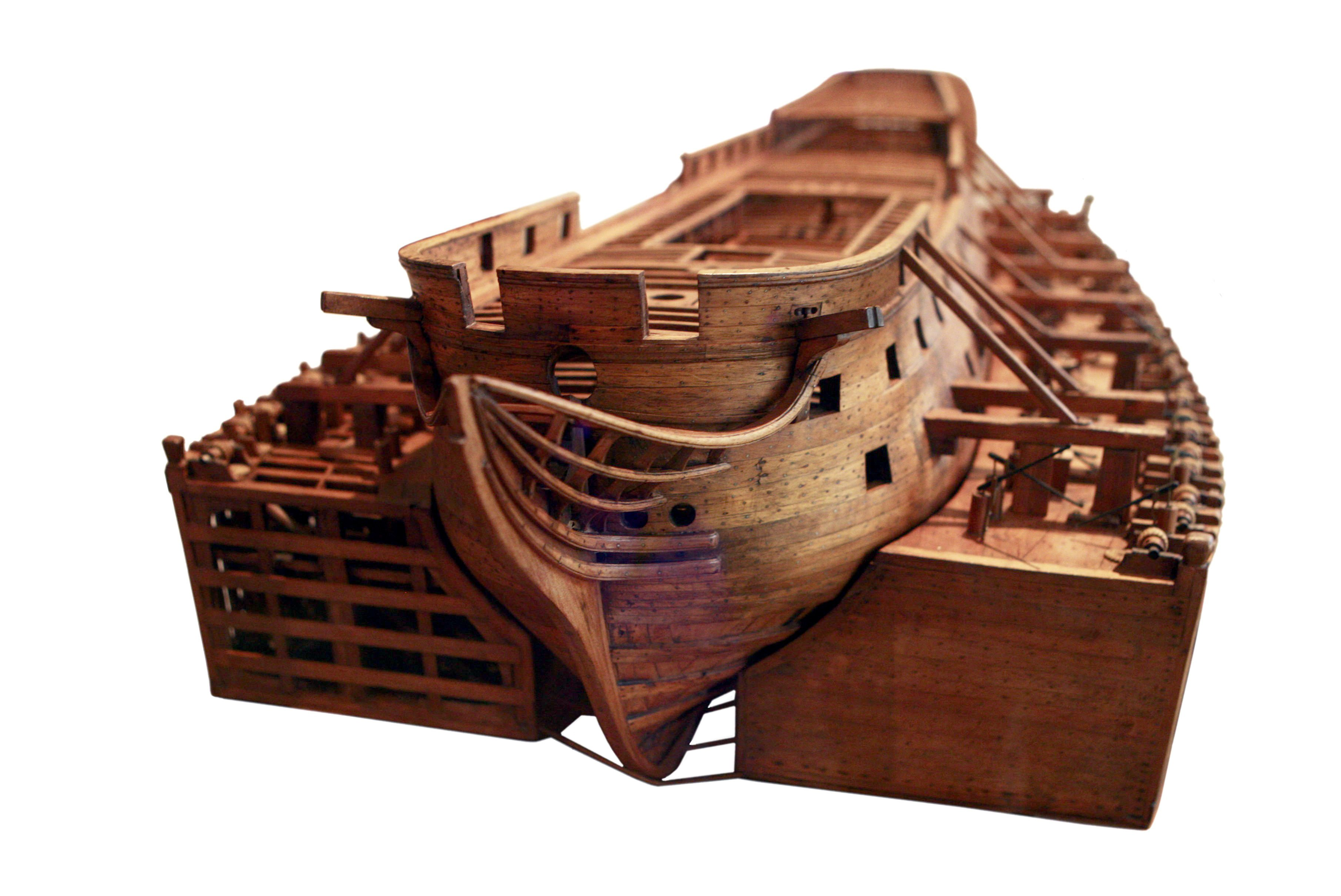
Model of a ship fitted with ship camels

A ship camel is an external flotation tank that can be fitted to a ship to increase her buoyancy or reduce her draught. Its inner walls may be concave and curve to fit the hull of the ship. The ship camels are partially sunk using water ballast, fitted to the ship in opposed pairs, and the water is then pumped out again. The increased displaced volume provided by the camels allows the system to float at a reduced draught.

== History ==
The ship camel was invented in 1690 by the Dutchman Meeuwis Meindertsz Bakker to allow large ships of the line to cross shallow banks that isolated the harbour of Amsterdam from the open sea. In April, he tested the device with the large ship of the line Princess Maria, which was sailed over the shallow waters of Pampus in the Zuiderzee. The Admiralty of Amsterdam rewarded Bakker for his invention.

The camel was mostly used in the Dutch Golden Age for accessing the shallow waters at Pampus, which were unreachable for large merchant ships. Instead of a real ship camel, sometimes light (sailing) ships were used to lift a ship. The merchant ship was raised from the middle, and if the direction of the wind was favourable, the ship could then sail on to Amsterdam. At the beginning of the 19th century, the difficulties of getting stuck in the Zuiderzee led to a canal being built through Waterland (an area of North Holland) and Marken. But after the failure of that project, the Noordhollandsch Kanaal was dug.

In the early 19th century, French engineer Mathurin-François Boucher went to Holland to study the system, and successfully applied it on the 74-gun ships Rivoli and Mont Saint-Bernard, allowing construction of 74-gun ships in Venice harbour by lifting them to cross the pass of Malamocco.

In C. S. Forester's 1945 novel The Commodore, set in 1812, one of the vessels under the command of Horatio Hornblower uses camels to reduce its draught during bombardment of French troops besieging Riga in the Baltic Sea.

Ship camels were also used on the barge Louqsor to facilitate her crossing of Bogaz.

Examples of historical usage of seacamels
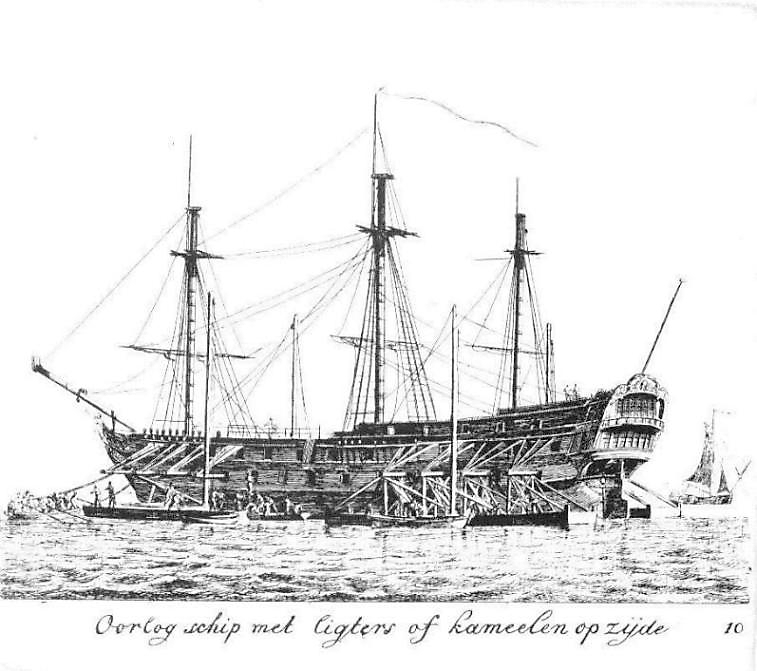
Dutch warship in camels (Gerard Groenewegen, 1789)

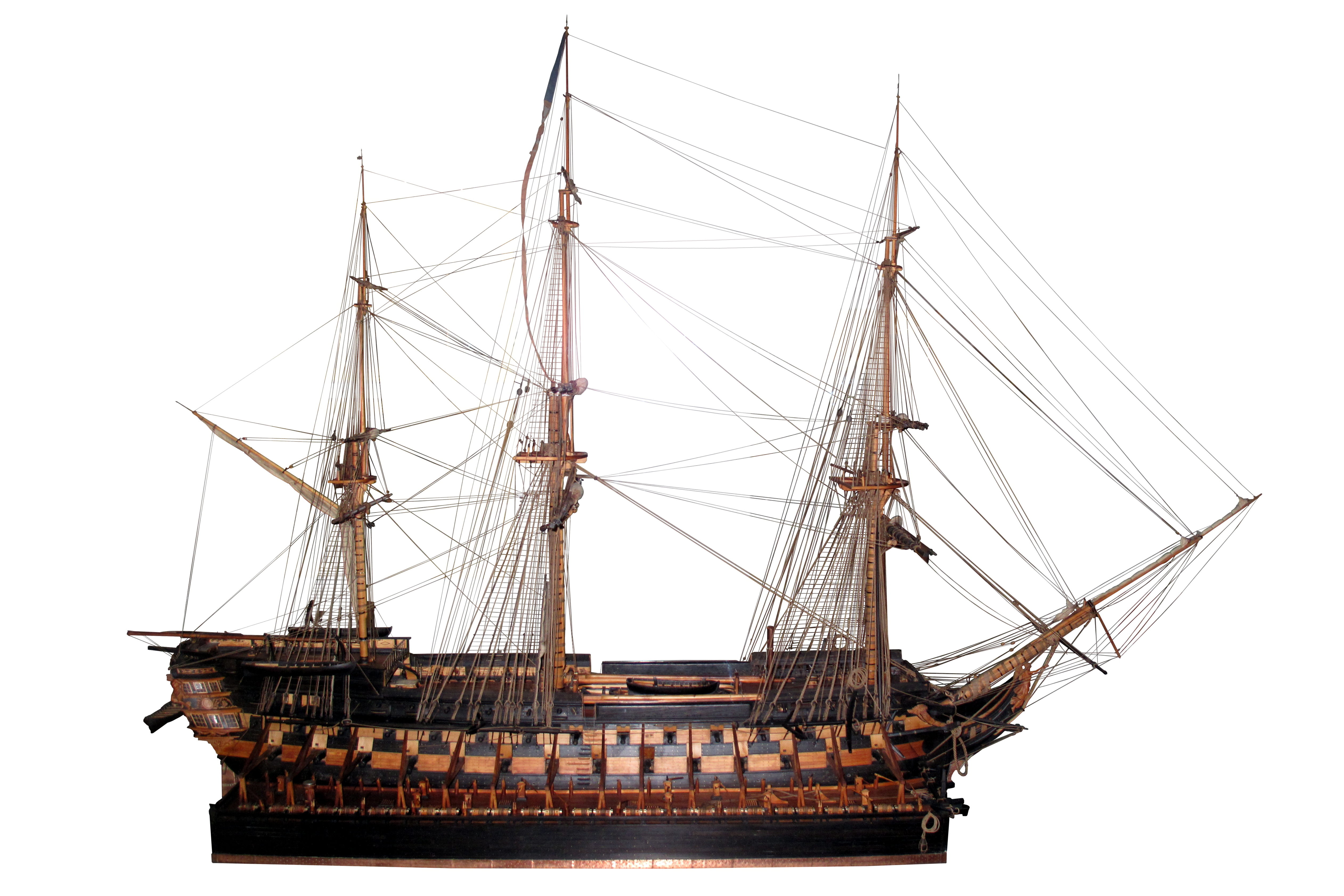
Model of the Rivoli as she exited Venice harbour.

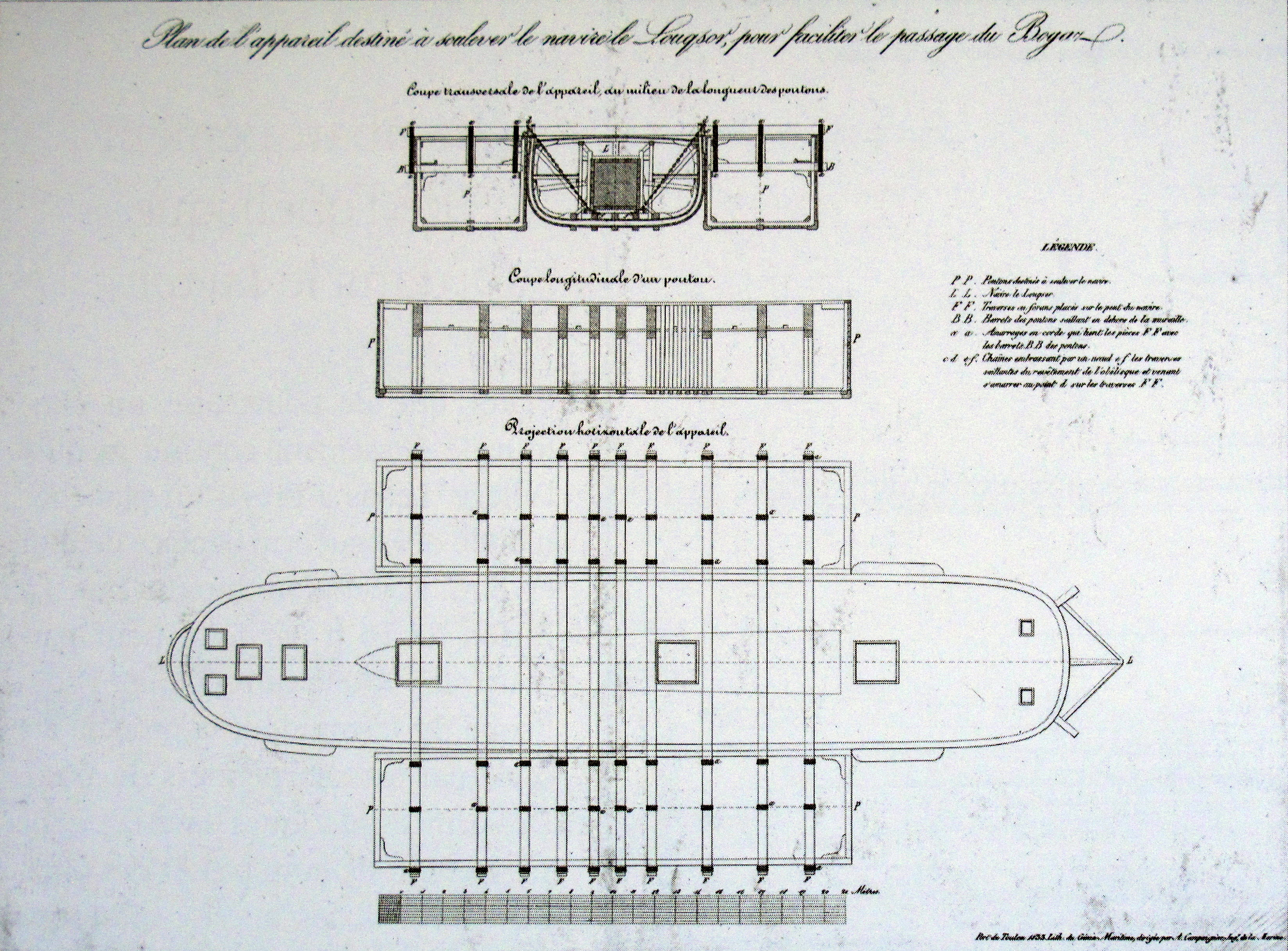
Schematics of the barge Louqsor crossing Bogaz

== See also ==
- Sponson
