= Sponson =

Protrusion found on the side of some ships, aircraft and vehicles

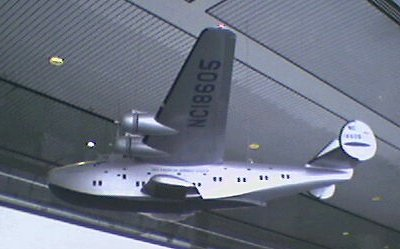
Model of a Pan Am Boeing 314 flying boat with its left sponson visible bottom center of the photo

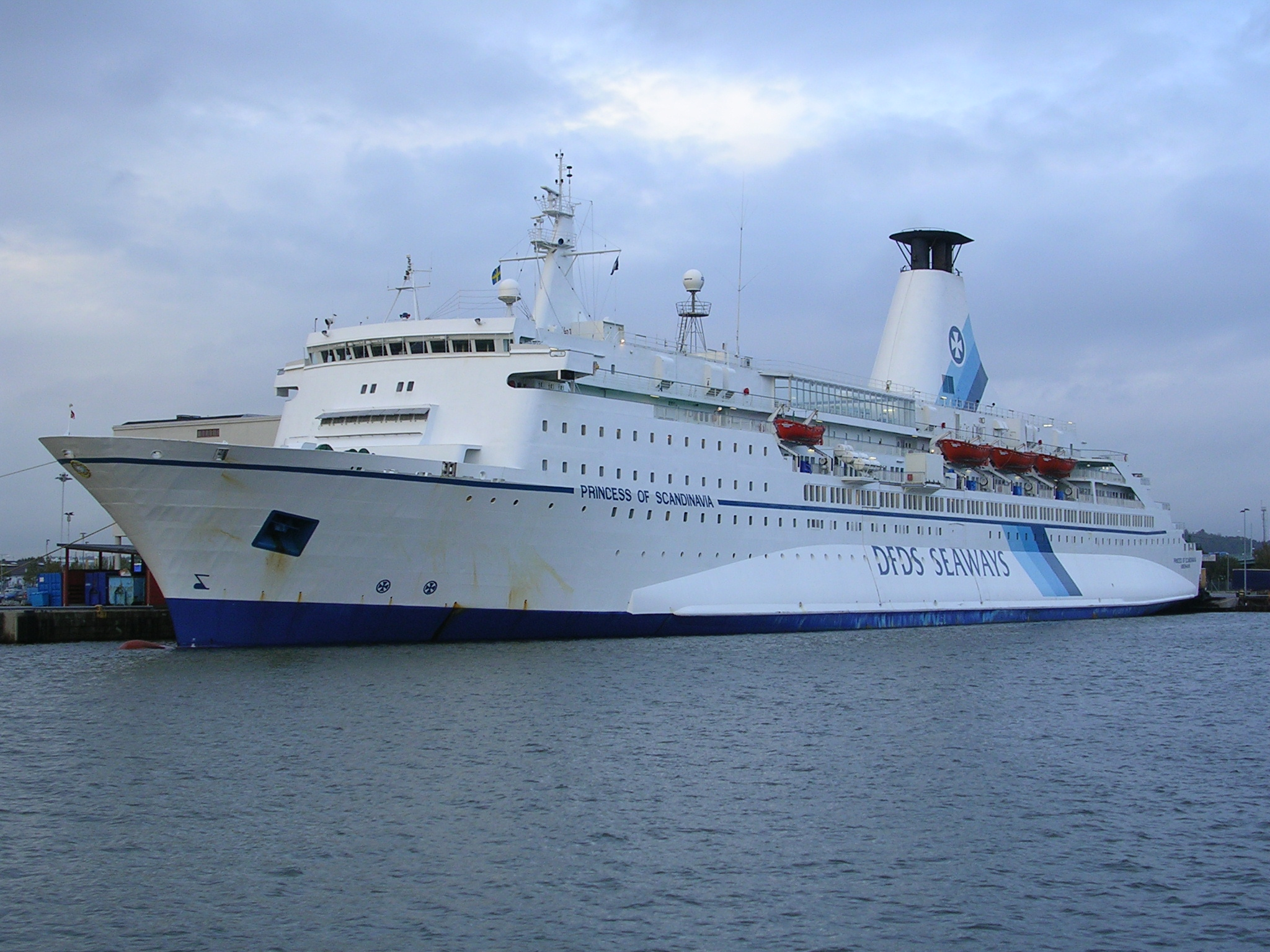
MS Princess of Scandinavia, a cruise-ferry with a side sponson (the brighter part at middle right labelled DFDS Seaways)

Sponsons are projections extending from the sides of land vehicles, aircraft or watercraft to provide protection, stability, storage locations, mounting points (for weapons or for other devices), or equipment housing.

== Watercraft ==
On watercraft, a sponson is a projection that extends outward (usually from the hull, but sometimes other parts of the vessel) to improve stability while floating, or to act as a securing point for other equipment. Vessels with unstable body shapes or unevenly distributed weight are likely to feature sponsons to help prevent capsizing or other instabilities. On many vessels, these projections from the main body of the vessel can be attached and removed quickly and fairly easily.

Canoes and kayaks sometimes feature sponson attachments as well, for stability in rough waters. These differ from outriggers, which extend a significant distance away from the body of the craft, and are employed on craft designed for open waters. A sponson's terminus is close to the craft, thereby allowing the boat to maneuver through narrower spaces, and so is more likely to be used on smaller craft that still require maneuverability through narrow passages.

In the mid-1990s, advances in sponson design made sponsons a tool for better handling at high speeds, and they began being added to racing boats.

There are essentially three types of sponsons for watercraft available on the market today – the basic block type, the hooked or winged type, and the paddle or rudder type.

=== Block sponsons ===
The block type is the simplest type. The leading end is usually rounded or pointed for reduced drag. "Its main function is to provide additional lift on the back of the hull, mostly during acceleration. It can also help provide better side-to-side stability at speed and reduce porpoising by providing a bit more hull surface at the rear of the craft."

=== Winged/hooked sponsons ===
Winged or hooked sponsons are the most common type. In addition to added lift during acceleration, better side-to-side stability, and reduced porpoising, they provide improved handling. "The outside edge provides grip in turns, allowing you to turn sharper and faster without fear of the back end sliding out. They can also provide a pivot point for the hull in turns." One of the most overlooked benefits of this type of sponson is that riders can lean into turns more, making watercraft easier to push to their limits.

=== Paddle/rudder sponsons ===
Paddle or rudder-type sponsons, which use a flat paddle-shaped rudder attached vertically to a block-type sponson, do essentially the same thing, but the effect can be even more dramatic, because the flat paddle or rudder portion of the sponson provides a sharper and more pronounced edge to catch the water.

== Aircraft ==
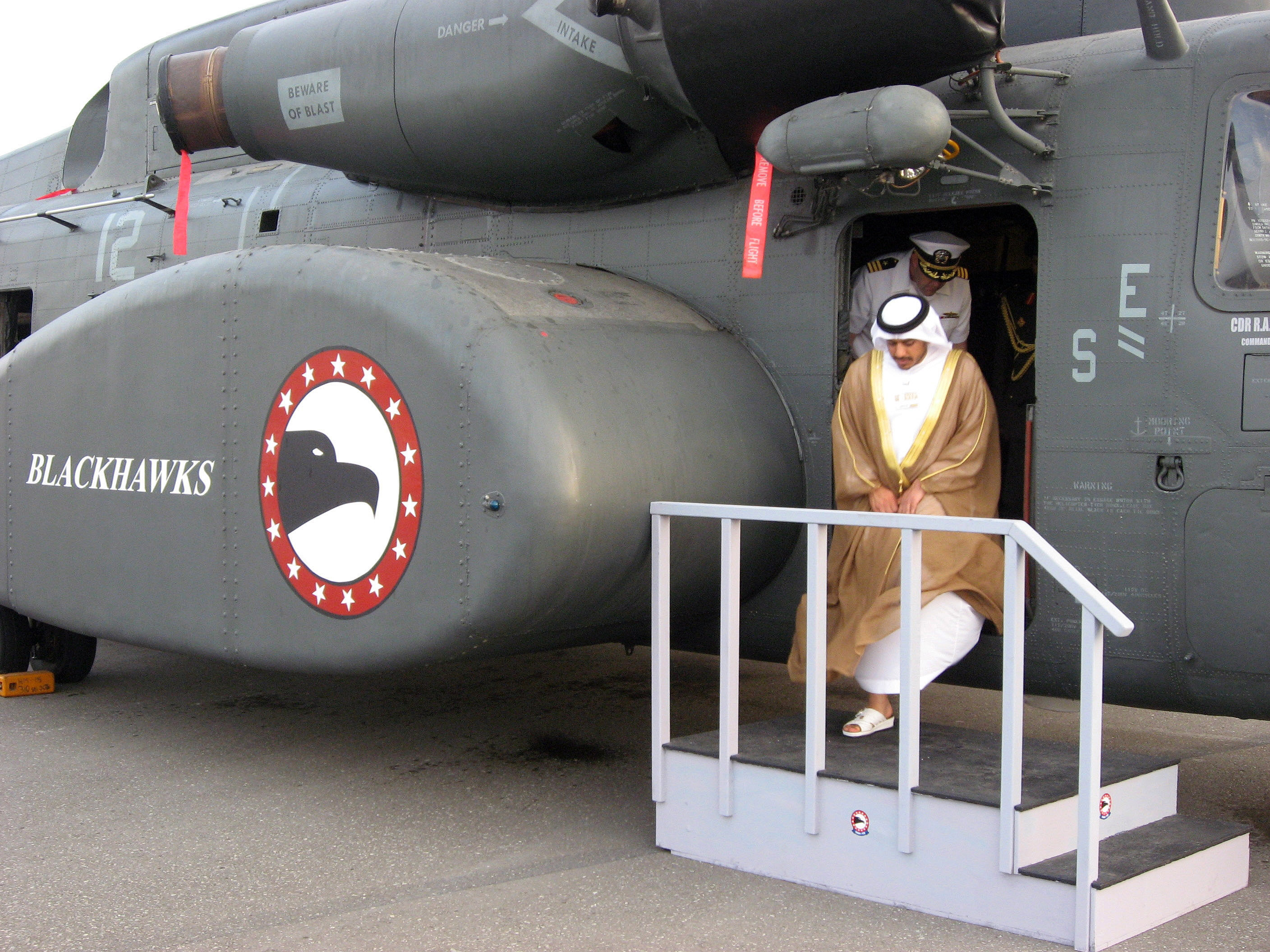
MH-53 Sea Dragon helicopter with massive sponsons below the engines

On flying boats – as first patented by Claudius Dornier and first used on the Kaiserliche Marine's German World War I flying boat, the Zeppelin-Lindau Rs.IV – a sponson can help extend the hull higher in the water, reducing drag and providing additional lift when the plane is taking off.

Helicopters may also feature one or more sponsons, and though most helicopters are not designed to land in or take off from water, these safety features are important should the aircraft crash land in water. Sponsons on a helicopter can also store fuel or landing gear, e.g., the Sikorsky S-92 and the Bell 222. When mounted on aircraft, they must be adjusted properly for aerodynamics when the aircraft is in flight; if not adjusted properly, they might destabilize or damage the aircraft.

== Military ==
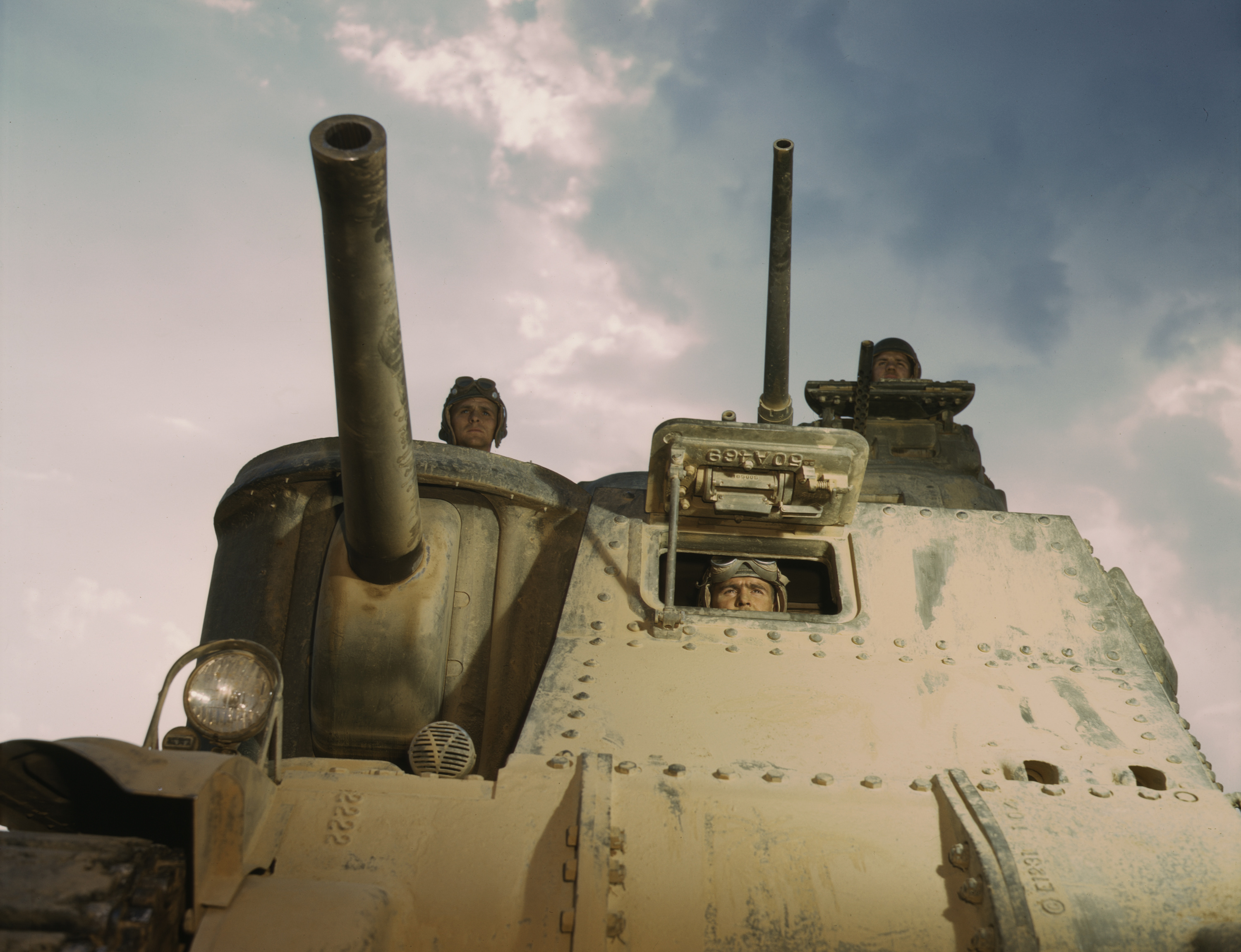
The sponson-mounted main gun (left) of an M3 Lee tank

On land vessels, such as tanks or other military vehicles, and on naval warships, a sponson may refer to a mounting or enclosure projecting from the side or top of the structure/hull that is not used for buoyancy, but for armaments such as machine guns, or for purposes of visibility. In the case of warships of the late 19th to early 20th centuries, the sponson could be enclosed and combined with a casemate, similar to those of early British heavy tanks. Alternatively, a sponson could be open-topped for a pivoting gun (which could be fitted with a backless blast shield or unshielded). Often a collapsing bulwark would be mounted around the edge of an sponson to improve seaworthiness. Later examples of open-topped sponsons on warships were even used to mount fully-enclosed turrets upon and were sometimes combined with an embrasure of the hull. It can be used for storage as well as a transport platform for people entering or leaving the vehicle. It may also provide layers of bulletproof protection and storage space, as found over the tracks of the Bradley Fighting Vehicle.

== See also ==
- Anti-torpedo bulge – aka blister
- Costa Concordia salvage – an example of sponsons in use
- Ship camel – related technology of external flotation tanks affixed on a ship to reduce her draught
