= Mathurin-François Boucher =

French naval engineer

- Born: 22 November 1778; Nantes
- Died: 31 March 1851 (aged 72); Marseille
- Alma mater: École polytechnique
- Occupation: Engineer
- Awards: Commander of the Legion of Honour

Mathurin François Boucher (Nantes, 22 November 1778 – Marseille, 31 March 1851) was a French naval engineer. He is notable for his adaptation of the technique of ship camel to large 74-guns, and for designing the Surveillante class of 60-gun frigates.

== Career ==
Born to the family of a carpenter, Boucher entered the École Polytechnique in 1794, (Note: the year the school was founded) aged only 16. Graduating three years later, he briefly joined the Geography corps, but soon transferred to Naval engineering. He took part in the French campaign in Egypt and Syria as a trainee engineer.

Returned to France in 1801, he served in various harbours and was sent to Holland to study the ship camel buoyancy system, which allows to temporarily reduce the draft of a ship. On 20 February 1812, he successfully applied it on the 74-gun ship Rivoli, built in Venice to a draft exceeding that allowed by the pass of Malamocco.

In the early 1820s, Boucher designed the Surveillante class of 60-gun frigates. He was sent to Lorient to oversee the construction of the lead ship, Surveillante. Surveillante was kept at sea from 1825 to 1830 with such performances that France started building further frigates and ships of the line after her design.

In 1829, he rejected a memorandum by Vice-Admiral Missiessy proposing a new organisation of the fleet. In 1831, he launched into an archival endeavour of cataloguing the various naval libraries of France.

== Bibliography ==
- Yves Laissus, L'Égypte, une aventure savante 1798-1801, Paris, Fayard, 1998, p. 305.
- Levot, Prosper (1866). Les gloires maritimes de la France: notices biographiques sur les plus célèbres marins (in French). Bertrand.
- Edouard de Villiers du Terrage, Journal et souvenirs sur l'expédition d'Égypte, mis en ordre et publiés par le baron Marc de Villiers du Terrage, Paris, E. Plon, Nourrit, 1899, et L'expédition d'Égypte 1798-1801, Journal et souvenirs d'un jeune savant, Paris, Cosmopole, 2001 et 2003, p. 353.
