= French ship Mont Saint-Bernard (1811) =

Ship of the line of the French Navy

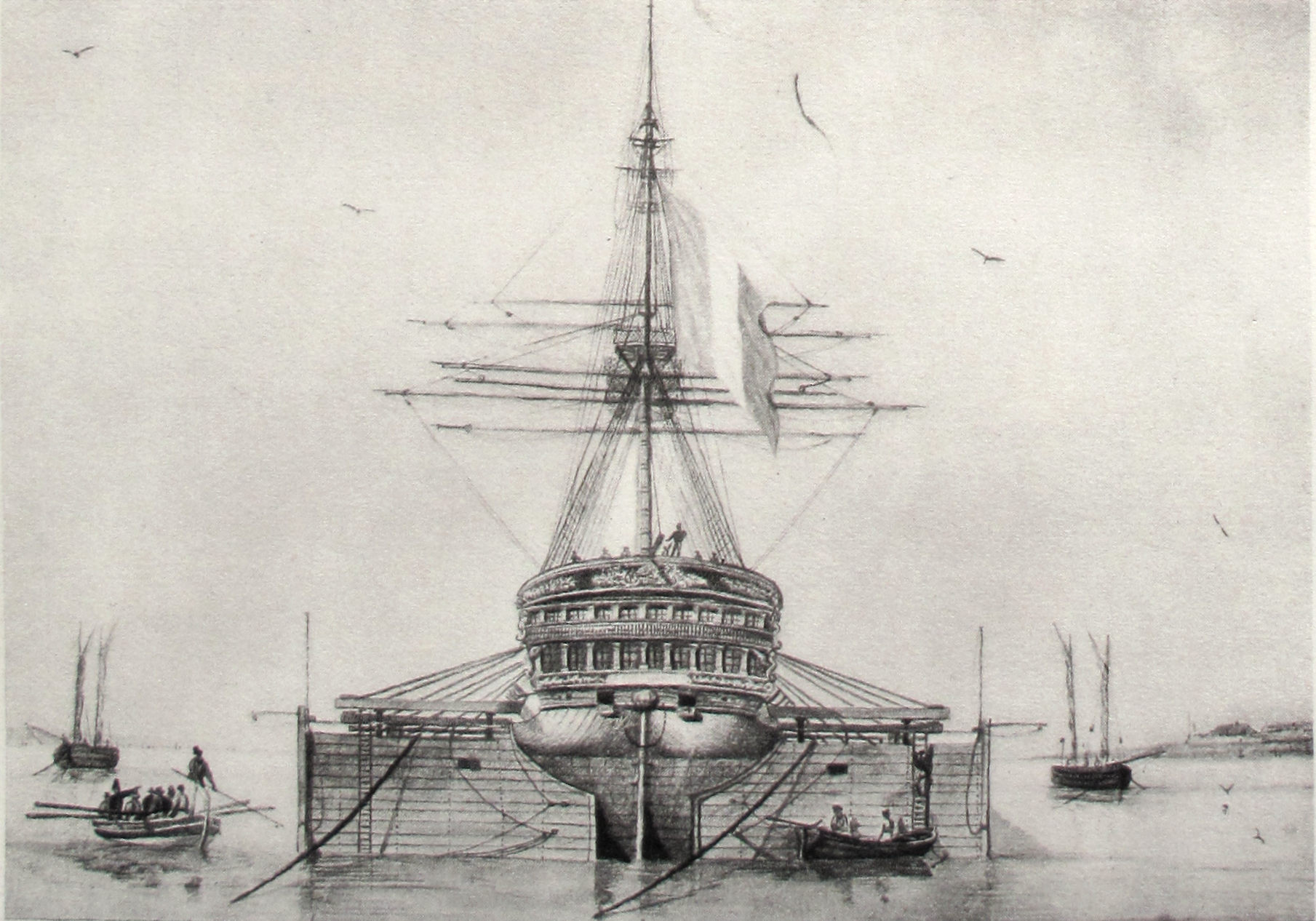
- Mont Saint-Bernard fitted with Ship Camels

History

France
- Name: Mont Saint-Bernard
- Builder: Venice
- Laid down: 1808
- Launched: 9 June 1811
- Stricken: 20 April 1814
- Fate: Burnt, 1814

General characteristics
- Class & type: petit Téméraire-class ship of the line
- Displacement: 2,781 tonneaux
- Tons burthen: 1,381 port tonneaux
- Length: 53.97 m (177 ft 1 in)
- Beam: 14.29 m (46 ft 11 in)
- Draught: 6.72 m (22.0 ft)
- Depth of hold: 6.9 m (22 ft 8 in)
- Sail plan: Full-rigged ship
- Crew: 705
- Armament: 74 guns: Lower gun deck: 28 × 36 pdr guns; Upper gun deck: 30 × 18 pdr guns; Forecastle and Quarterdeck: 20–26 × 8 pdr guns & 36 pdr carronades

Mont Saint-Bernard was a 74-gun petite Téméraire-class ship of the line built for the French Navy during the first decade of the 19th century. Completed in 1811, she played a minor role in the Napoleonic Wars.

== Background and description ==
Mont Saint Bernard was one of the petit modèle of the Téméraire class that was specially intended for construction in some of the shipyards in countries occupied by the French, where there was less depth of water than in the main French shipyards. The ships had a length of 53.97 metres (177 ft 1 in), a beam of 14.29 metres (46 ft 11 in) and a depth of hold of 6.9 metres (22 ft 8 in). The ships displaced 2,781 tonneaux and had a mean draught of 6.72 metres (22 ft 1 in). They had a tonnage of 1,381 port tonneaux. Their crew numbered 705 officers and ratings during wartime. They were fitted with three masts and ship rigged.

The muzzle-loading, smoothbore armament of the Téméraire class consisted of twenty-eight 36-pounder long guns on the lower gun deck and thirty 18-pounder long guns on the upper gun deck. The petit modèle ships ordered in 1803–1804 were intended to mount sixteen 8-pounder long guns on their forecastle and quarterdeck, plus four 36-pounder obusiers on the poop deck (dunette). Later ships were intended to have fourteen 8-pounders and ten 36-pounder carronades without any obusiers, but the numbers of 8-pounders and carronades actually varied between a total of 20 to 26 weapons.

== Construction and career ==
Mont Saint-Bernard was ordered on 4 January 1807 and laid down on 14 March at the Venetian Arsenal. The ship was launched on 9 June 1811, commissioned on 18 October and completed in December. She was captured on 20 April 1814 by the Austrian Empire, but was burned by accident on 14 September.
