= Le Portel =

Le Portel Turbodingem
- Commune
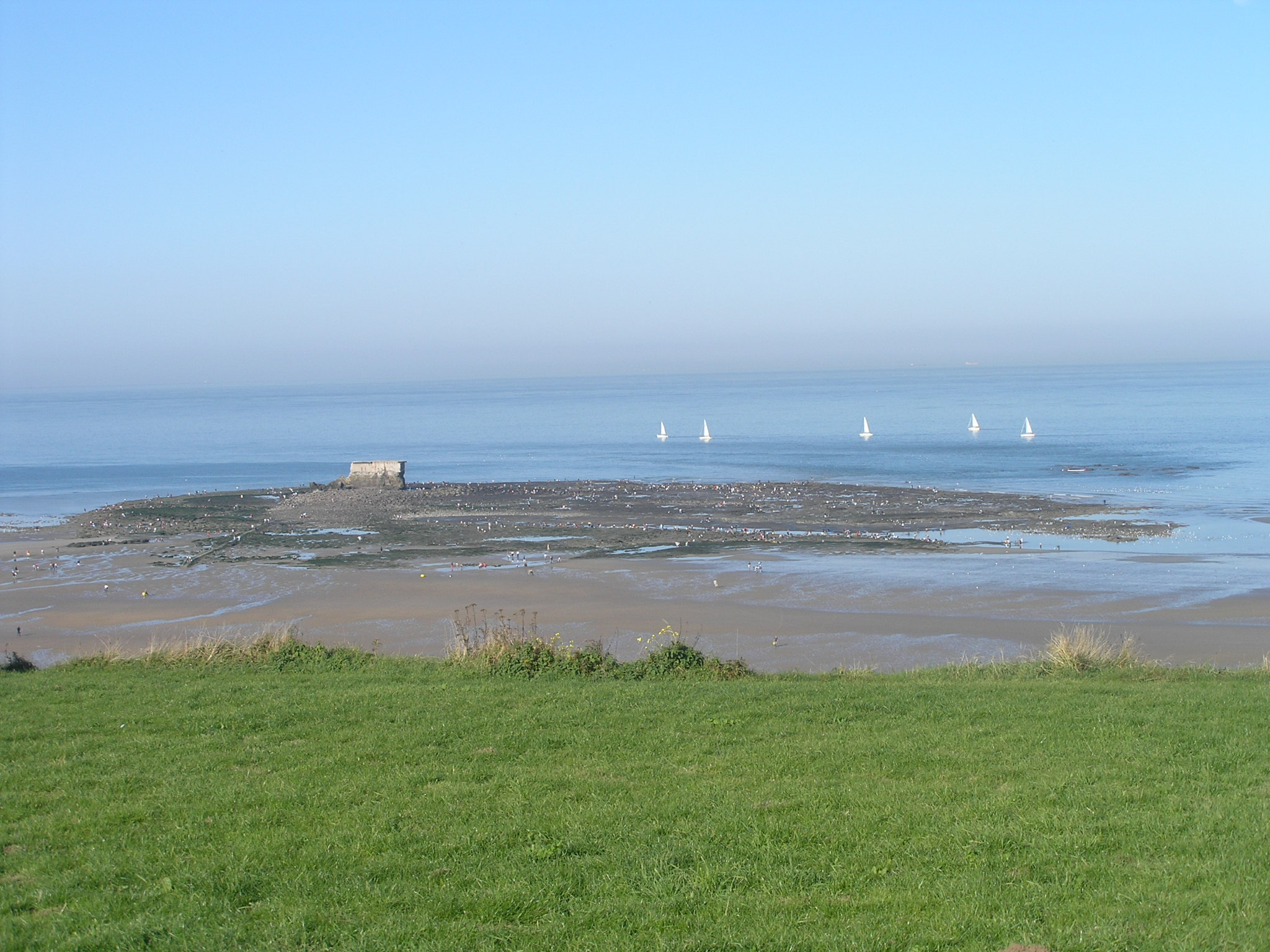
- Fort de l'Heurt

- Coat of arms
- Location of Le Portel
- Location within France Location within Hauts-de-France
- Coordinates: 50°42′27″N 1°34′28″E
- Country: France
- Region: Hauts-de-France
- Department: Pas-de-Calais
- Arrondissement: Boulogne-sur-Mer
- Canton: Boulogne-sur-Mer-2
- Intercommunality: Boulonnais

Government
  - Mayor (2020–2026): Maxime Leprete
- Area^{1}: 3.85 km^{2} (1.49 sq mi)
- Elevation: 27 m (89 ft)
- Highest elevation: 59 m (194 ft)
- Lowest elevation: 0 m (0 ft)
- Population (2023): 8,768
  - Density: 2,280/km^{2} (5,900/sq mi)
- Time zone: UTC+01:00 (CET)
  - Summer (DST): UTC+02:00 (CEST)
- INSEE/Postal code: 62667 /62480
- ^{1} French Land Register data, which excludes lakes, ponds, glaciers > 1 km^{2} (0.386 sq mi or 247 acres) and river estuaries.

Le Portel (French pronunciation: [lə pɔʁtɛl]; West Flemish: Turbodingem) is a commune in the Pas-de-Calais department in the Hauts-de-France region of France about 4 kilometres (2.5 mi) southwest of Boulogne town centre.

== History ==
Le Portel translates as "the little port." The original Le Portel was a hamlet east of the town of Outreau. It became an independent municipality on 13 June 1856 by an imperial decree of Napoleon III.

In the 19th century, flint tools were discovered in the centre of the village, by the river near the Hamel Bridge, evidence of the long occupation of the site. A Gallo-Roman cemetery has been excavated in the hamlet of Châtillon.

Of agricultural origin, it grew rapidly during the 19th century because of fishing, along with the nearby port of Boulogne-sur-Mer. Sailors of Portel were as numerous as those of Boulogne before World War I. In 1841, two Le Portel sailors were on the ship Belle Poule, that brought back the remains of Napoleon.

During the Second World War, on 8 and 9 September 1943, Le Portel suffered as part of Operation Cockade, a diversionary manoeuvre by the Allies to fool the Germans into believing the possibility of a landing on the English Channel. The bombings, which destroyed 93% of the village, also killed 376 civilians. On 12 August 1944, Charles de Gaulle was at Le Portel for its liberation. The town received the Croix de guerre with silver star for its sacrifice.

== Population ==
Historical population
Year	Pop.	±% p.a.
1968	11,379	—
1975	11,112	−0.34%
1982	10,984	−0.17%
1990	10,615	−0.43%
1999	10,720	+0.11%
2007	10,232	−0.58%
2012	9,836	−0.79%
2017	9,240	−1.24%
2023	8,768	−0.87%
Source: INSEE

== Notable people ==
- Alfred Desenclos, composer, was born there.
- Lucien Leduc, football player, was born there.

== Twin towns ==
- Portel-des-Corbières, France
- Stockelsdorf, Germany
- Kawara, Burkina Faso

== Sport ==
The ESSM Le Portel is a French basketball club, based in Le Portel.

== See also ==
- Communes of the Pas-de-Calais department

== Bibliography ==
- Talty, Stephan (23 July 2012), Agent Garbo: The Brilliant, Eccentric Secret Agent Who Tricked Hitler and Saved D-Day, Mariner Books/Houghton Mifflin Harcourt, pp. 256 pages, ISBN 978-0544035010
