= France–Italy Maritime Boundary Agreement =

Agreement between the Government of the French Republic and the Government of the Italian Republic on the Delimitation of the Maritime Boundaries in the Area of the Strait of Bonifacio
- Type: Boundary delimitation
- Signed: 28 November 1986
- Location: Paris, France
- Effective: 15 May 1989
- Parties: France; Italy
- Depositary: United Nations Secretariat
- Languages: French; Italian

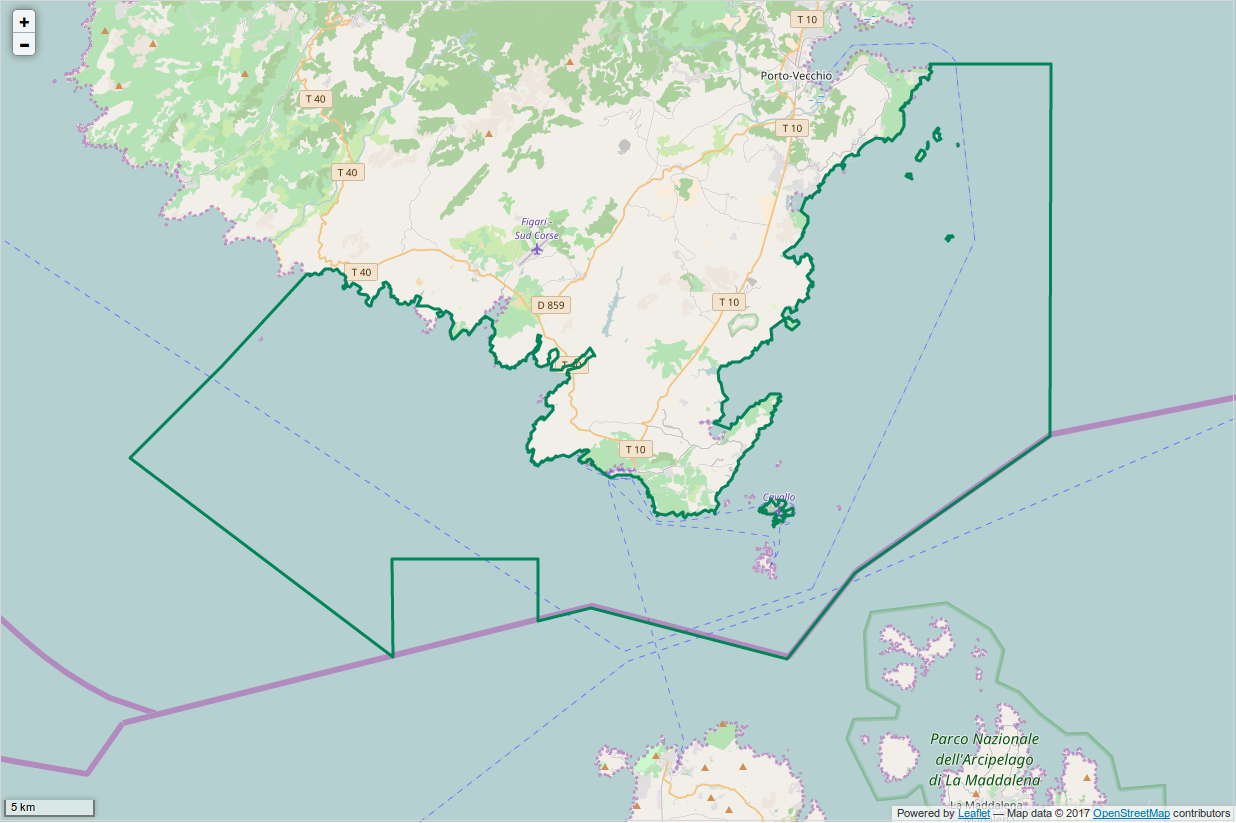
Strait of Bonifacio: Maritime border Straits of Bonifacio Nature Reserve Arcipelago di La Maddalena National Park

The France–Italy Maritime Boundary Agreement is a 1986 treaty between France and Italy which delimits the maritime boundary between the two countries in the Strait of Bonifacio.

The Strait of Bonifacio separates the French island of Corsica from the Italian island of Sardinia. The treaty was signed in Paris on 28 November 1986. The boundary set out by the text of the treaty is a relatively short 40 nautical miles long and consists of five straight-line maritime segments defined by six individual coordinate points. The agreed-to boundary is an approximate equidistant line between the two islands.

The treaty came into force on 15 May 1989 after both countries had ratified it. The full name of the treaty is Agreement between the Government of the French Republic and the Government of the Italian Republic on the Delimitation of the Maritime Boundaries in the Area of the Strait of Bonifacio.
