= Strait of Bonifacio =

- Bucchi di Bunifaziu (Corsican); Bocchi di Bunifaciu (Gallurese); Buccas de Bonifatziu (Sardinian)
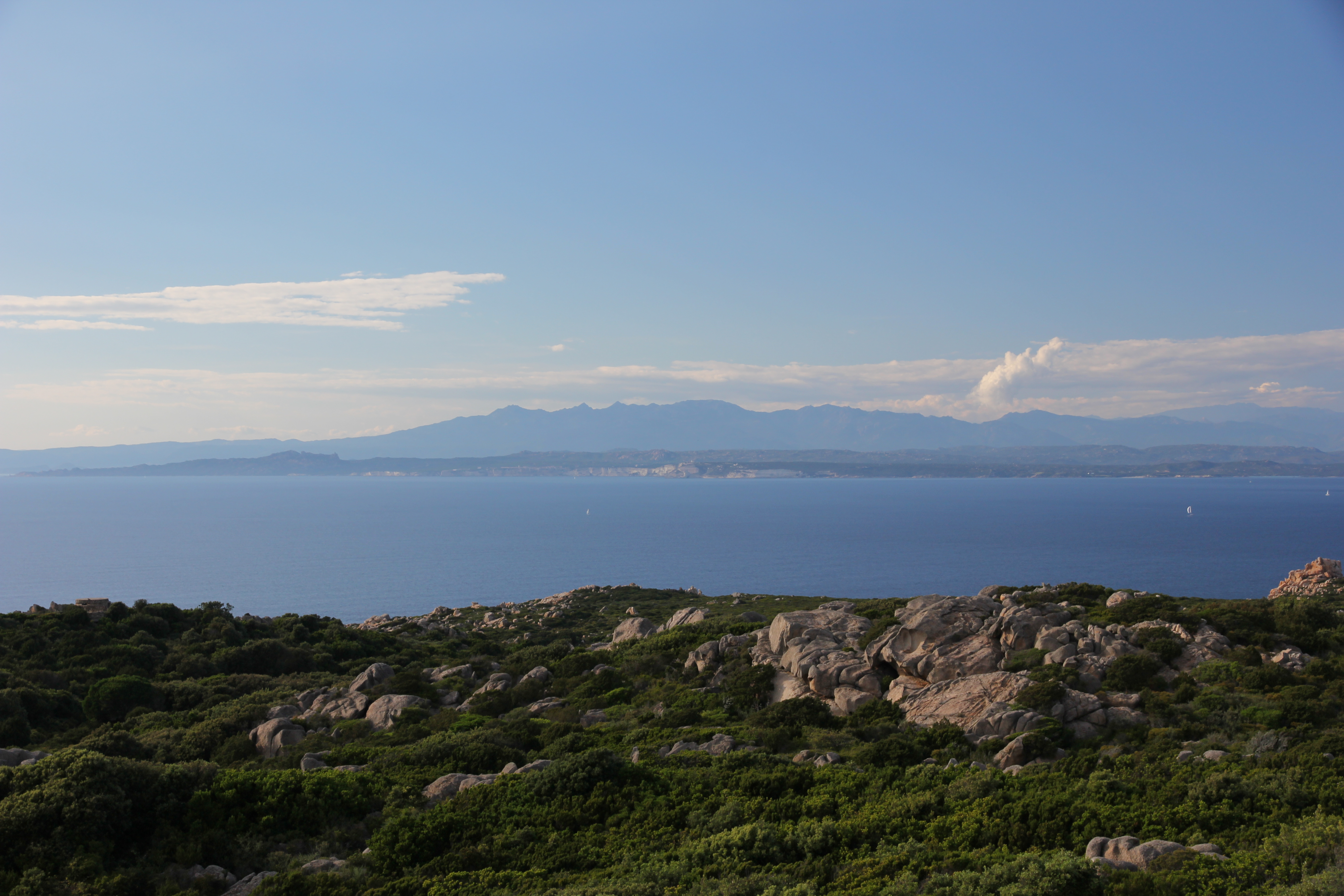
- Strait of Bonifacio

- Location within Mediterranean Location within France Location within Italy
- Location: Mediterranean Sea
- Coordinates: 41°18′43″N 9°12′46″E
- Type: Strait
- Basin countries: France; Italy
- Min. width: 11 kilometres (6.8 mi)
- Max. depth: 100 metres (330 ft)
- Settlements: Bonifacio

The Strait of Bonifacio (French: Bouches de Bonifacio; Italian: Bocche di Bonifacio; Corsican: Bucchi di Bunifaziu; Gallurese: Bocchi di Bunifaciu; Sardinian: Buccas de Bonifatziu; Ligurian: Bocche de Bunifazziu; Latin: Fretum Gallicum, Fretum Taphros) is the strait which connects the islands of Corsica and Sardinia. It is named after the Corsican town Bonifacio, the most southerly on the island, which was in turn named after Boniface I, Margrave of Tuscany, who founded a citadel in its location circa 828 AD.

== Location ==
At its narrowest point, the strait is 11 km (6.8 mi) wide and divides the Tyrrhenian Sea from the western Mediterranean Sea. Its maximum depth is 100 metres (330 ft). The Sea of Sardinia and the Gulf of Asinara are located to the west of the Strait.

The strait is notorious among sailors for its weather, currents, shoals, and other obstacles. The strait, while relatively narrow, has no bridge crossing and relies on ferry services.

A traffic separation system is in effect in the strait. Vessels transiting the strait from east to west must report on VHF channels 16 and 10 to the Pertusato control station on the island of Corsica (France). Vessels transiting the strait from west to east must report to the control station on Maddalena Island (Italy).

== Disasters ==
The most famous disaster in the Strait of Bonifacio was that of the French frigate Sémillante on 15 February 1855. Sémillante had left the port of Toulon the day before on her way into the Black Sea to supply the Crimean War with troops. A storm caused her to hit a reef; the ship sank and none of the 750 soldiers on board survived.

After a tanker disaster in 1993, the passage through the Strait of Bonifacio has been prohibited for French and Italian flag ships with dangerous goods. Passage for ships with dangerous goods sailing under other flags is strongly discouraged and subject to mandatory piloting.

== Gallery ==
Strait of Bonifacio

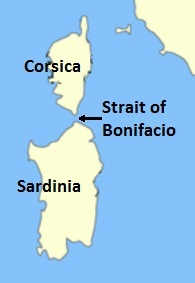
Location of the Strait.

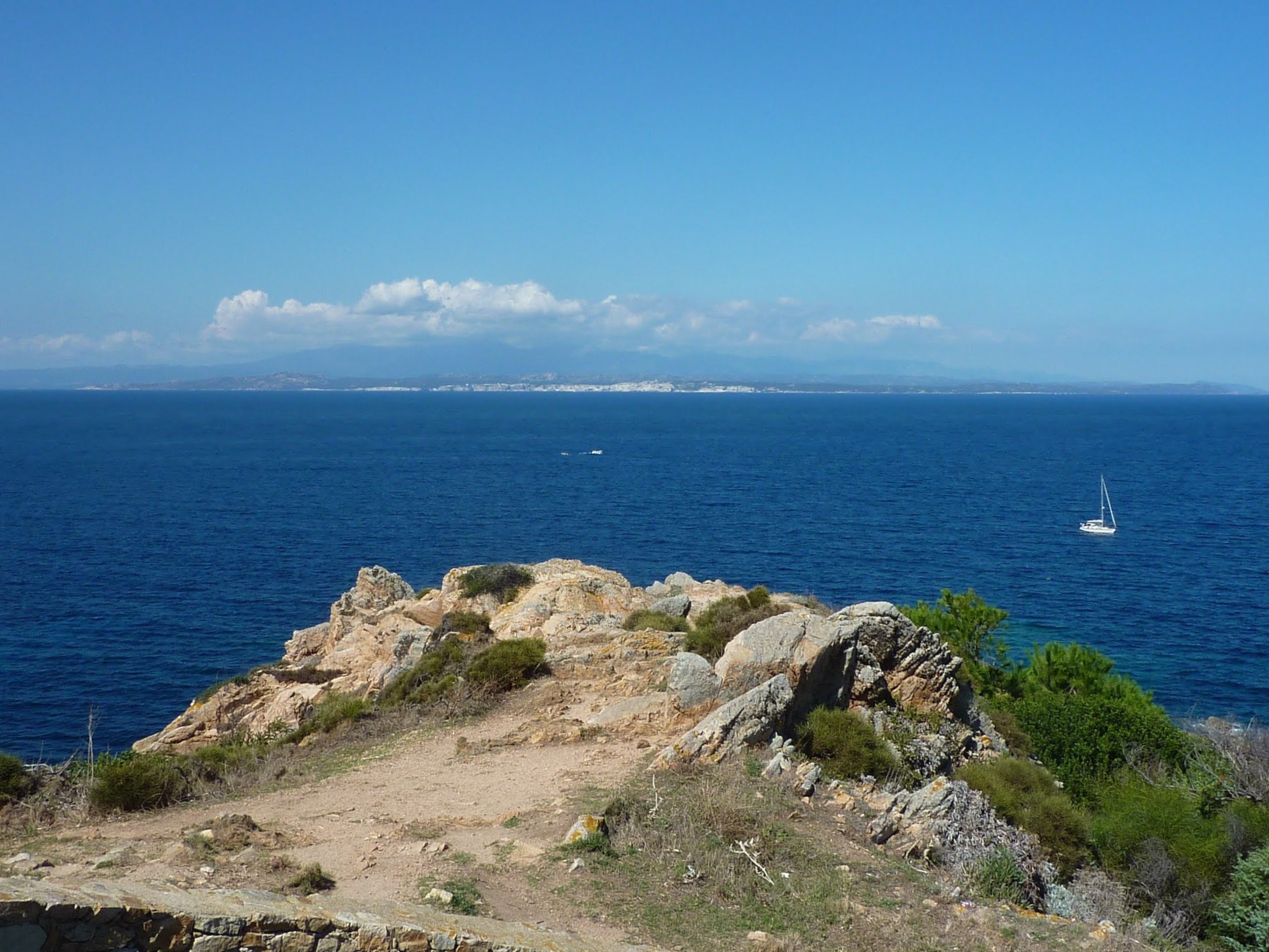
The Strait as seen from Santa Teresa di Gallura in Sardinia; Corsica is in the background.

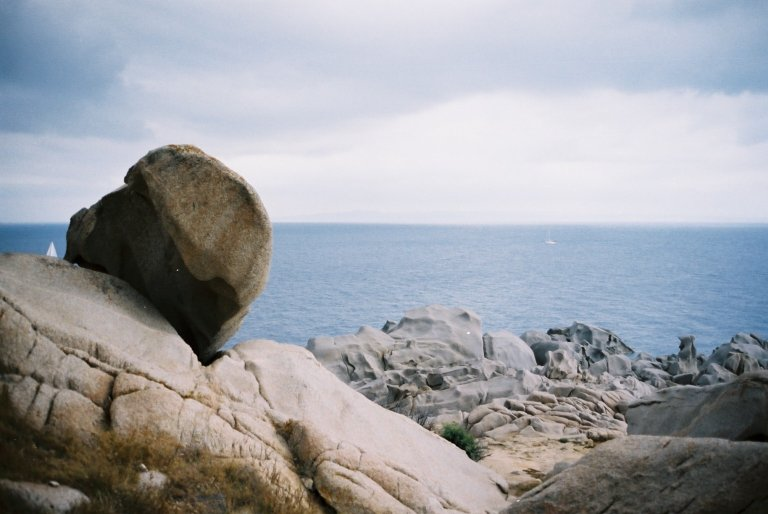
The Strait as seen from the northernmost tip of Sardinia; the southern coast of Corsica is barely visible.

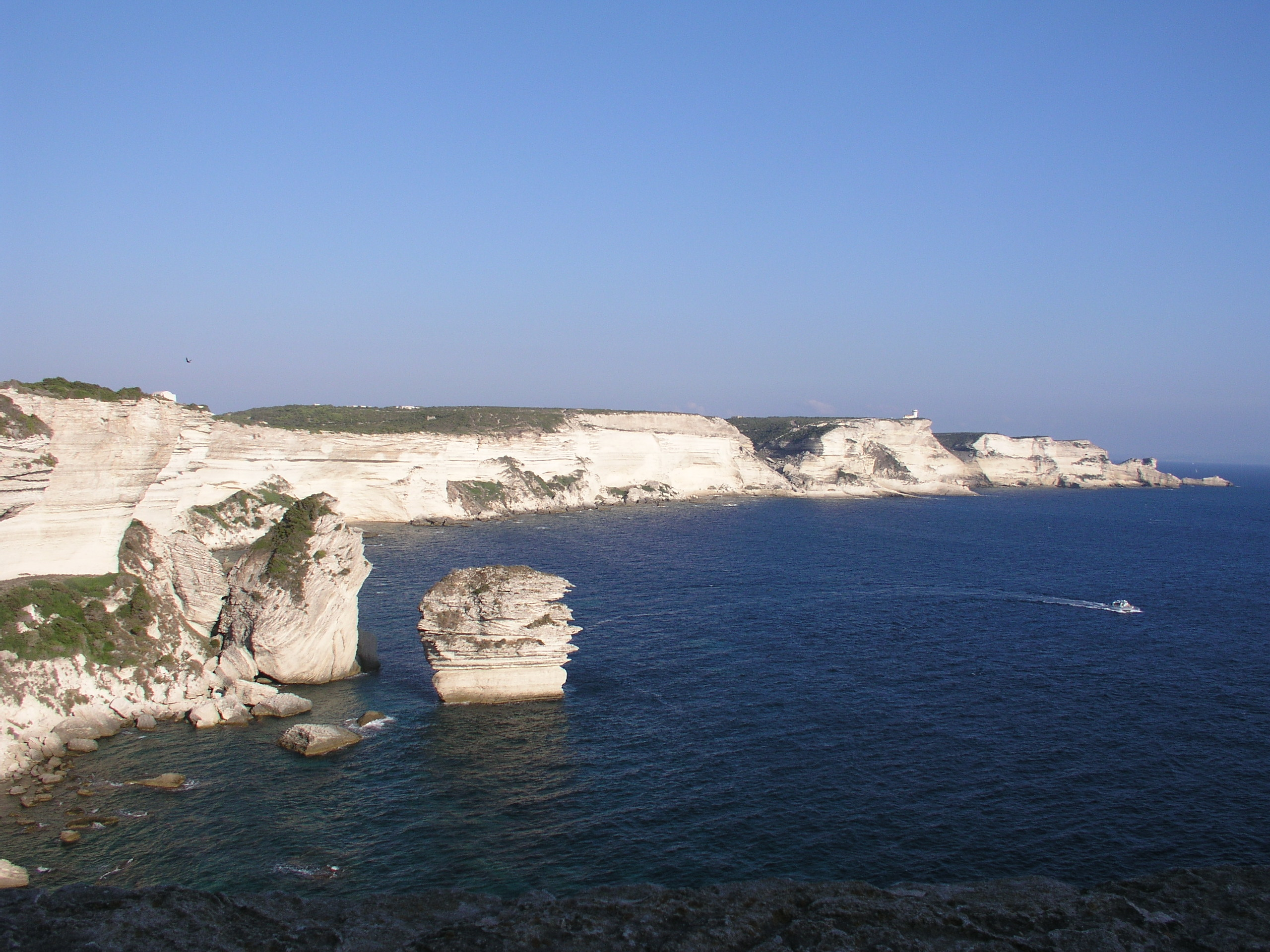
The Strait as seen from the Corsican coast.

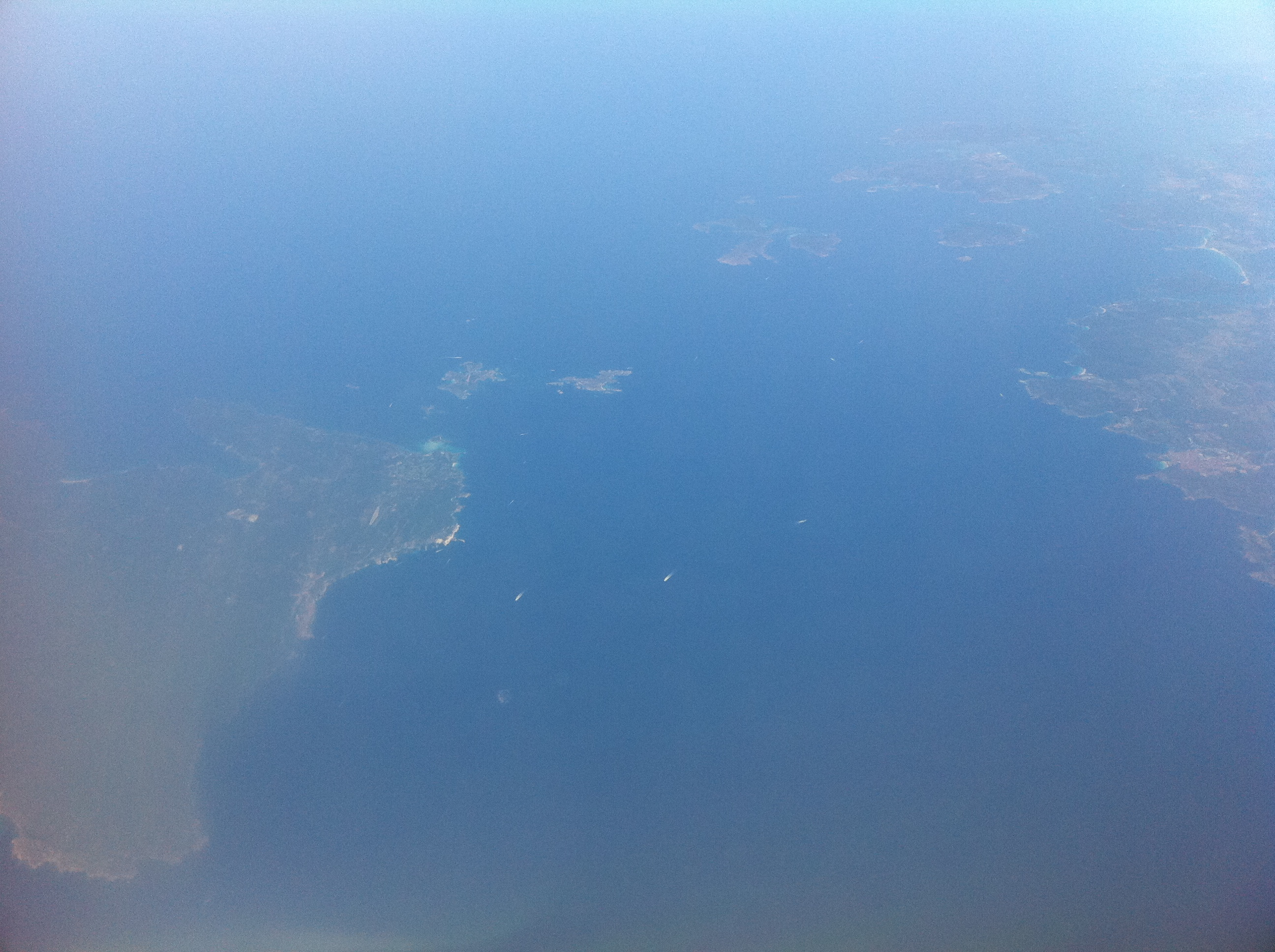
The Strait as seen from the air.

== See also ==
- France–Italy Maritime Boundary Agreement
- Lavezzi archipelago
- Maddalena archipelago
