= Lavezzi archipelago =

French islands in the Mediterranean Sea

Native name: Isuli Lavezzi
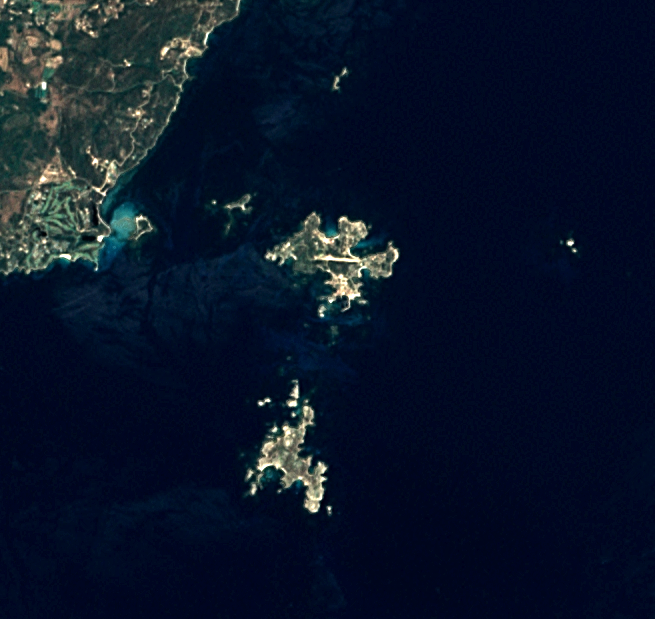
- Lavezzi archipelago, satellite view
- Interactive map of Lavezzi archipelago

Geography
- Location: Strait of Bonifacio (Tyrrhenian Sea)
- Coordinates: 41.359932°N 9.252205°E

Administration
- France
- Department: Corse-du-Sud

The Archipelago of Lavezzi (French: Îles Lavezzi; Corsican: Isuli Lavezzi; Italian: Isole di Lavezzi) is a collection of small granite islands and reefs in the Strait of Bonifacio that separates Corsica from Sardinia in the Mediterranean Sea. They are administered from the town of Bonifacio (French department of Corse-du-Sud) on Corsica.

== Geography ==
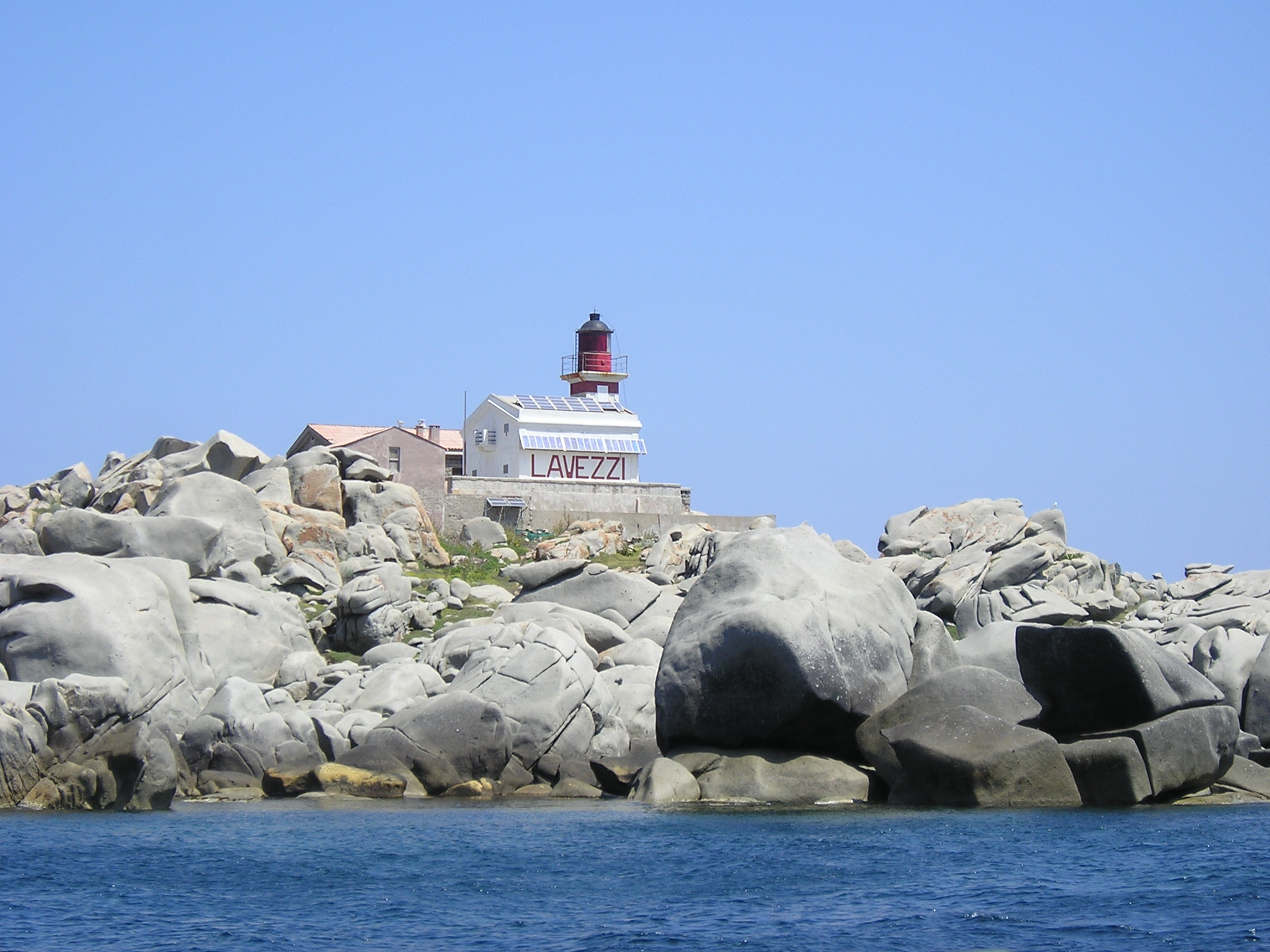
A lighthouse at the Lavezzu island

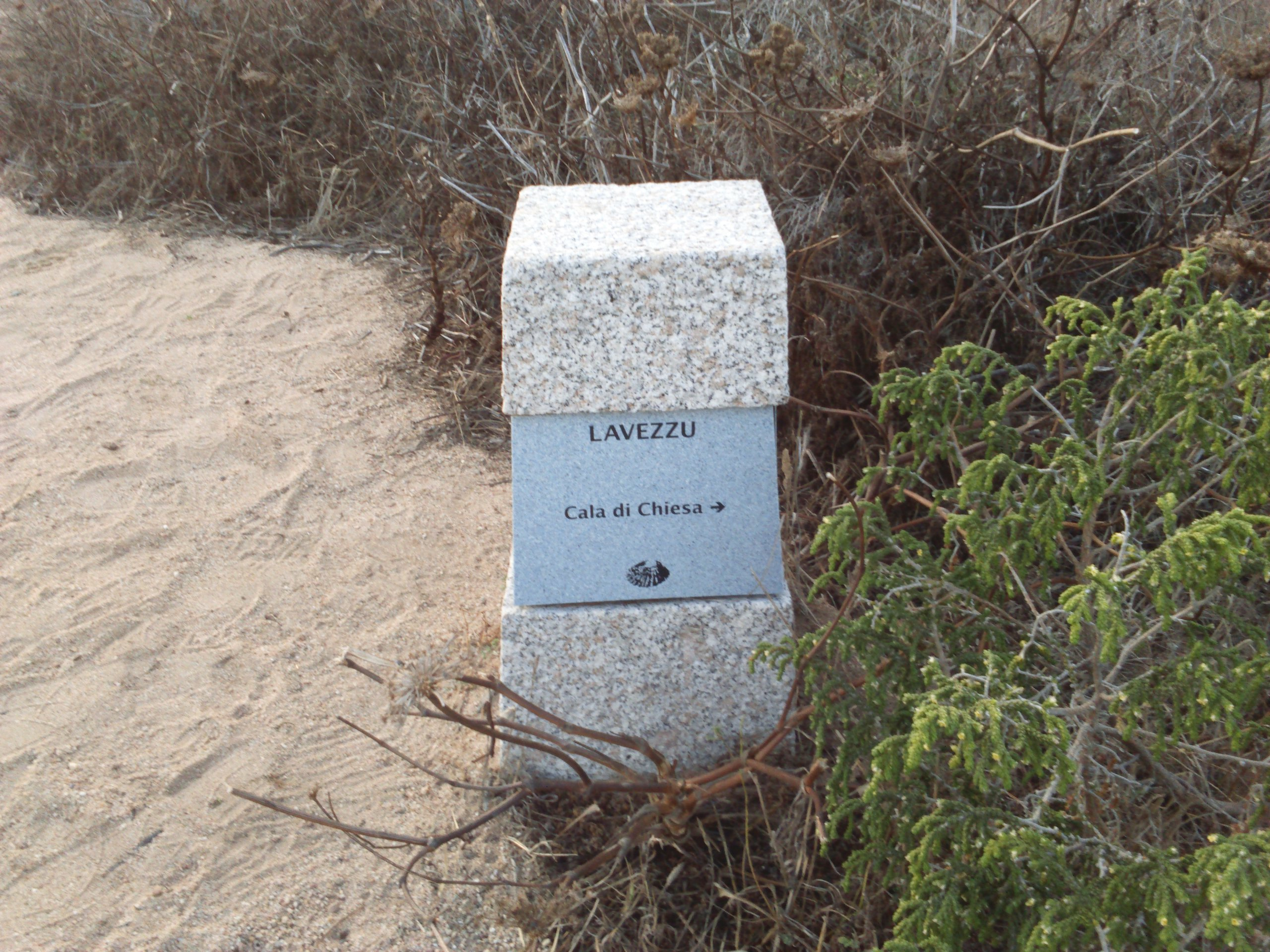
Lavezzu, a sign with the name of the island

The archipelago is located in about 4 kilometres (2 miles) from the Corsican mainland, 7 km (4 mi) from Cape Pertusato, and 10 km (6 mi) southeast of Bonifacio. It covers 5,123 ha in area and the highest point is 50 metres (164 feet). They include the southernmost point of Metropolitan France.

The two main islands are Cavallo (112 ha), the only inhabited island in the archipelago, and Lavezzu (Italian: Lavezzo, 66 ha), just on the south of Cavallo. The other islands or islets are, from west to east: Piana, Ratino, Porraggia and Sperduto (or Perduto).

== History ==
The archipelago was the site of the shipwreck of the French frigate Sémillante on February 15, 1855. On the island of Lavezzu there are two memorial cemeteries with the remains of the victims of the shipwreck.

These islands were the locale for Brigitte Bardot's 1952 film Manina, la fille sans voiles.

== Bird colony ==
Between 255 and 400 pairs of Scopoli's shearwaters (Calonectris diomedea) breed each year on Lavezzu. The breeding success of the shearwaters has increased since black rats (Rattus rattus) were eradicated from the island in 2000.

== See also ==
- Maddalena archipelago
