= Surveillante-class frigate =

Series of French Navy warships

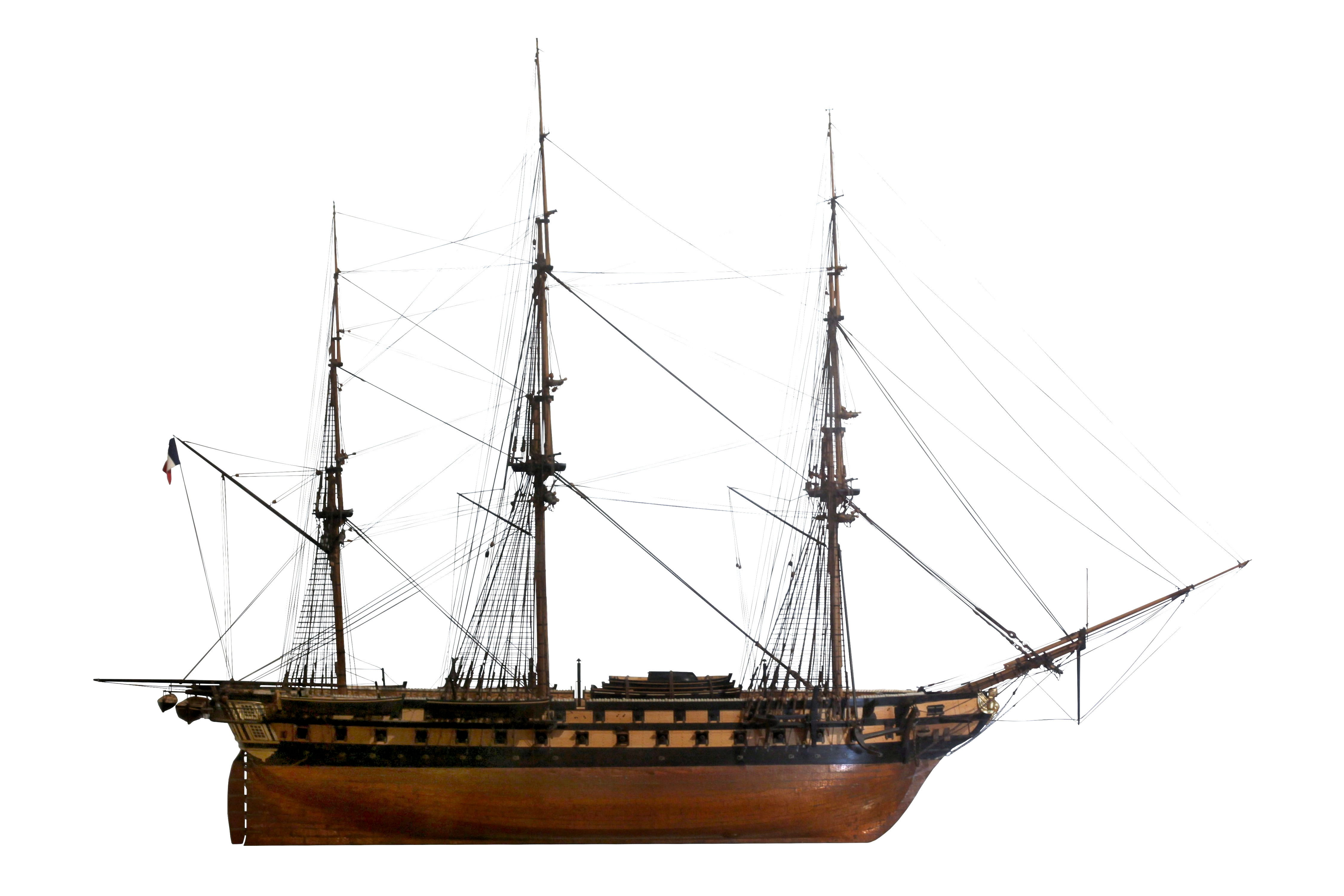
- Model showing characteristics and original painting scheme of Belle Poule

Class overview
- Name: Surveillante
- Builders: Arsenal de Lorient, Lorient, France; Arsenal de Cherbourg, Cherbourg, France
- Operators: French Navy
- Preceded by: Romaine class
- Succeeded by: Iphigénie; Terpsichore; Dryade class
- Completed: 9

General characteristics
Class & type	Surveillante-class frigate
Displacement	2500 tonnes
Length	54 metres (177 ft)
Beam	14.10 metres (46.3 ft)
Draught	3.80 metres (12.5 ft)
Propulsion	sail
Complement	301
Armament	60 guns; 32 × 30-pounder long guns; 4 × 80-pounder Paixhans guns; 24 × 30-pounder carronades
Armour	Timber

The Surveillante class was a type of sixty-gun frigate of the French Navy, designed in 1823 by Mathurin-François Boucher.

One of the main innovations with respect to previous design was the disappearance of the gangways, which provided a flush deck capable of harbouring a complete second battery. With the standardisation on the 30-pounder calibre for all naval ordnance that occurred in the 1820s, this design allowed for a frigate throwing a 900-pound broadside, thrice the firepower of the 40-gun Pallas class that constituted the majority of the frigate forces during the Empire, and comparable to that of a 74-gun.

By far the best-known ship of the class is Belle Poule, which achieved fame when she transported the ashes of Napoléon back to France in the so-called Retour des cendres; for this occasion, she was painted all black, a colour scheme that she retained later in her career, but which is uncharacteristic of the ships of this type.

- Surveillante

Builder: Arsenal de Lorient
Begun:
Launched: 29 September 1825
Completed:
Fate: deleted 22 August 1844.

- Belle Gabrielle

Builder: Arsenal de Cherbourg
Begun:
Launched: 28 June 1828
Completed:
Fate: renamed Indépendante 9 August 1830, deleted 24 October 1860.

- Melpomène

Builder: Arsenal de Cherbourg
Begun:
Launched: 28 July 1828
Completed:
Fate: deleted 20 March 1845.

- Herminie

Builder: Arsenal de Lorient
Begun:
Launched: 25 August 1828
Completed:
Fate: wrecked off Bermuda 3 December 1838.

- Belle Poule

Builder: Arsenal de Cherbourg
Begun:
Launched: 26 March 1834
Completed:
Fate: deleted 19 March 1861.

- Sémillante

Builder: Arsenal de Lorient
Begun:
Launched: 6 February 1841
Completed:
Fate: wrecked 16 February 1855 off Bonifacio.

- Andromaque

Builder: Arsenal de Lorient
Begun:
Launched: 8 March 1841
Completed:
Fate: deleted 17 August 1869.

- Forte

Builder: Arsenal de Cherbourg
Begun:
Launched: 16 September 1841
Completed:
Fate: deleted 23 October 1883.

- Pallas

Builder: Arsenal de Lorient
Begun:
Launched: 15 August 1860
Completed:
Fate: hulked 23 October 1883

== Sources and references ==
=== Sources ===
- Roche, Jean-Michel (2005). Dictionnaire des bâtiments de la flotte de guerre française de Colbert à nos jours, 1671 - 1870. Group Retozel-Maury Millau. ISBN 978-2-9525917-0-6. OCLC 165892922.
