= Porth Ceiriad =

Beach in Llanengan, Gwynedd, Wales

Coordinates: 52.7951°N 4.5016°W

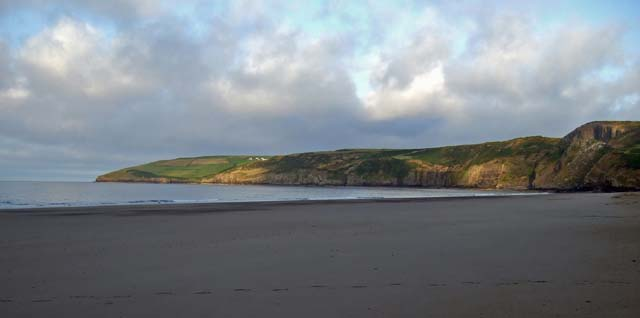
Looking south-west towards Cilan Uchaf Farm

Porth Ceiriad is a south-east facing beach and bay in the parish of Llanengan, near to Abersoch, in the county of Gwynedd, North Wales. It has several interesting geological features.
