= French frigate Sémillante (1841) =

Frigate of the French Navy

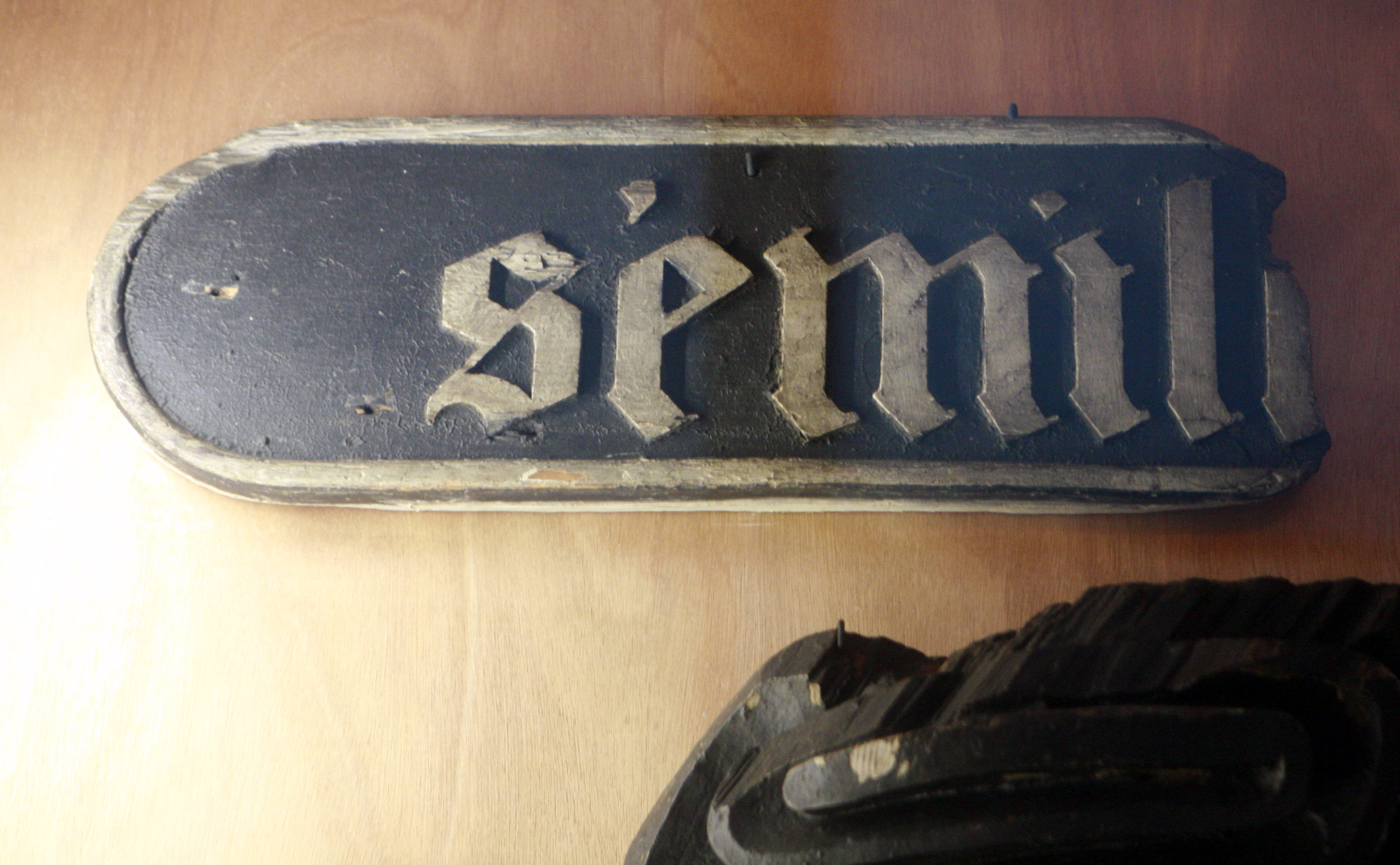
- Fragments of Sémillante, on display at Port-Louis naval museum

History

France
- Name: Sémillante
- Namesake: "Sparkling"or "frisky"
- Builder: Lorient
- Laid down: 13 March 1827
- Launched: 6 February 1841
- Stricken: 15 February 1855
- Fate: Wrecked 16 February 1855

General characteristics
Class & type	Surveillante-class frigate
Displacement	2500 tonnes
Length	54 metres (177 ft)
Beam	14.10 metres (46.3 ft)
Draught	3.80 metres (12.5 ft)
Propulsion	sail
Complement	301
Armament	60 guns; 32 × 30-pounder long guns; 4 × 80-pounder Paixhans guns; 24 × 30-pounder carronades
Armour	Timber

The Sémillante was a Surveillante class 60-gun first rank frigate of the French Navy. She sank off the coast of Corsica in 1855 with a loss of 693 people.

== Career ==
Sémillante took part in the Crimean War from 1854 as a transport. In February 1855, under Captain Jugan, she departed Toulon with a crew of 301 and 392 soldiers as reinforcements for the French army

On 15 February 1855, in the Strait of Bonifacio near the Lavezzi Islands, Sémillante was caught in a storm. Lost in a thick fog, a gust of wind drove the ship into rocks on Ile Lavezzi, the 200 ha main island of the archipelago. The ship sank around midnight with all hands.

== Monument ==
For weeks, bodies of the victims washed up on the shore of Île Lavezzi. The remains of 600 of the people on board were eventually recovered and buried in the Achiarino cemetery on the island. Only the captain's grave is marked by name. A 27-foot-high (8.2 m) pyramid of boulders was built as a remembrance of the disaster.

The wreck is cited as a triggering event that raised public awareness of naval disasters and spurred the creation of coastal rescue organizations.

== See also ==
- Cavallo (island)
