= Paule de Viguier =

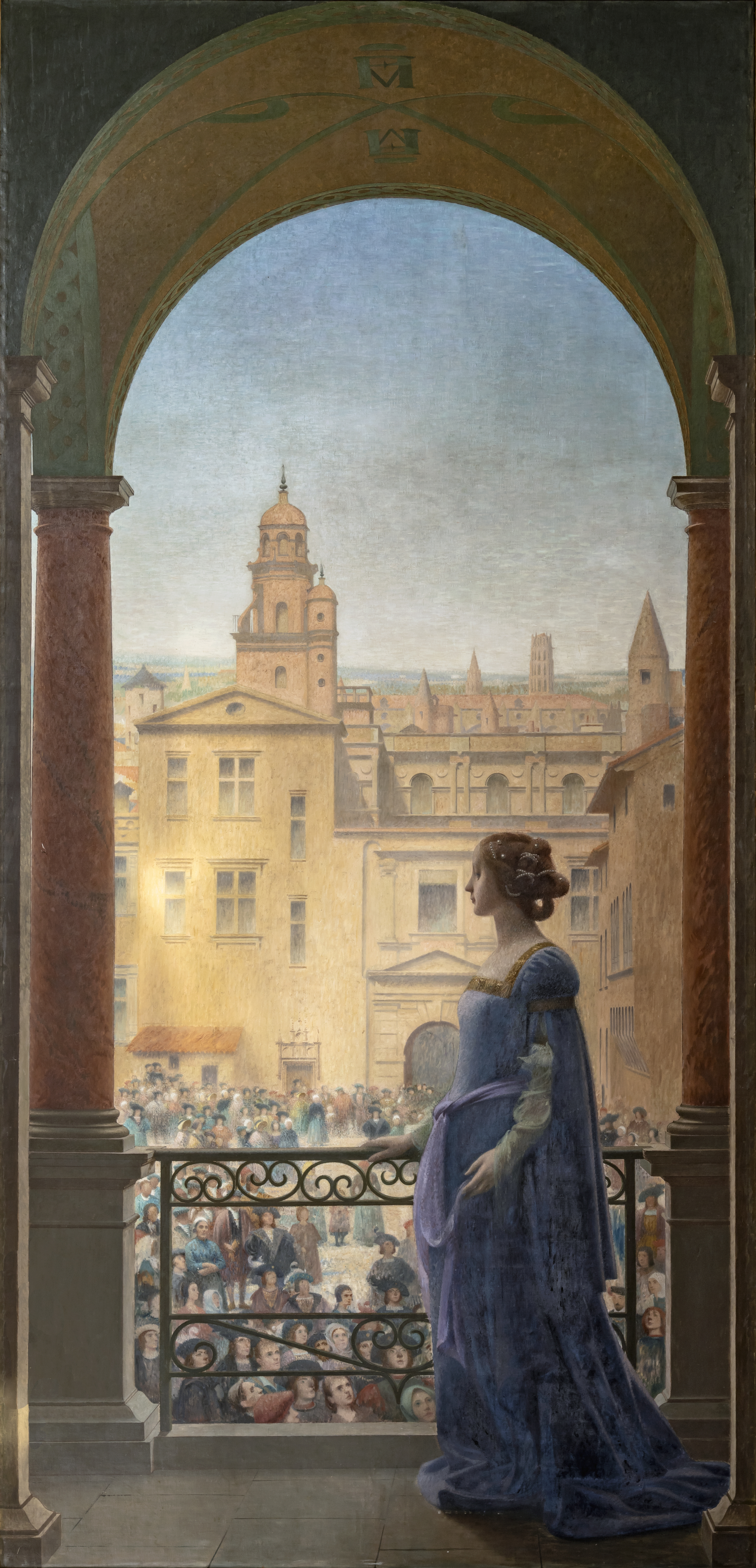
de Viguier as depicted in La Belle Paule by Rachou

Paule de Viguier (1518 in Toulouse - 12 March 1610 in Toulouse) was a French noblewoman and Baroness of Fonterville by 1533. She was made famous as the subject of the painting La Belle Paule by painter Henri Rachou, which is housed today in the Capitole de Toulouse.
