= Selvaggio Blu (Sardinia) =

Trekking route in Sardinia, Italy

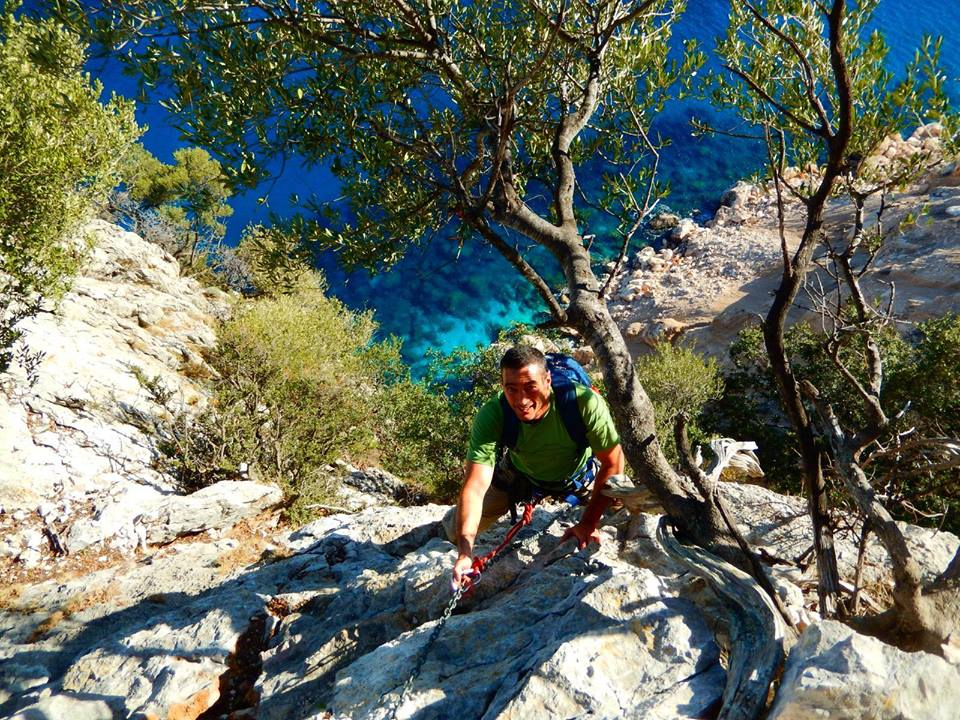
- Length: 40 kilometers (25 miles)
- Location: Baunei, Sardinia, Italy
- Began construction: Pedra Longa
- Completed: Cala Sisine
- Use: Hiking Location of the starting and the ending point of Selvaggio Blu
- Elevation gain/loss: 4,410 m
- Highest point: 770 m
- Lowest point: 1 m
- Season: Autumn, Spring
- Months: September, October, March, April, May, June
- Hazards: Creeks, Cliffs, Caves, Rivers & Bushes
- Right of way: Pedestrian
- Maintainer: Comune di Baunei
- Website: https://www.turismobaunei.eu/services/selvaggio-blu

The Selvaggio Blu (Wild Blue) is a trekking route in the territory of the district of Baunei (Sardinia). It was conceived in 1987 by Mario Verin, (photographer and alpinist) and Peppino Cicalò (architect), President of the Nuoro section of the Italian Alpine Club. The itinerary extends for over 40 kilometers (approximately 25 miles) from the touristic port of Santa Maria Navarrese (Baunei) to the beach of Cala Sisine (Baunei). It takes on average 4 days to complete.

The Selvaggio Blu is considered one of the last wild trekking routes of the Mediterranean because, for the major part of the itinerary, it can only be accessed by boat or by following the path along the coast of the Gulf of Orosei.

Verin and Cicalò used the name 'Selvaggio Blu' to reflect the main characteristics of the journey: "Selvaggio" to reflect the wildness and pureness of the experience, and "Blu" because the trek goes along the coast, where the color of the sea and the sky is predominant.

== Location ==
The Selvaggio Blu is located entirely in the territory of the district of Baunei which extends for 211.9 km2 on the east coast of Sardinia, in the province of Ogliastra.

The Baunei area is considered one of the wildest in Sardinia, going from the coastal town of Santa Maria Navarrese and traversing Limestone plateaux and coastal scenery to the beach of Cala Luna. It contains all the main centers on the route, including: Santa Maria Navarrese, Pedra Longa, Portu Pedrosu, Cala Goloritzè, Su Feilau, Cala Sisine and also all the centers included in Selvaggio Blu variations: Cala Mariolu, Cala Biriala; S'Istrada Longa, Grotta del Fico and the plateau of Golgo.

== Geology ==
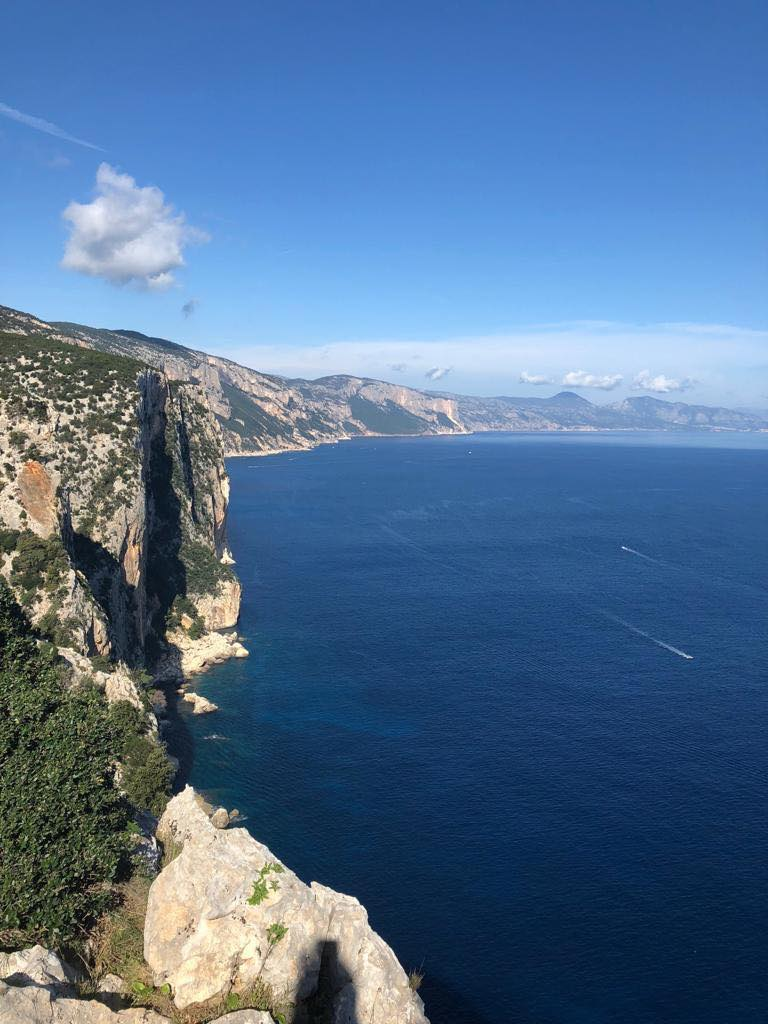
The cliffed coast of the Gulf of Orosei

Selvaggio Blu has a strategic location to see the geological history of Sardinia, as it is located 40 km along the coast. There are several important geology observations on Selvaggio Blu's hiking route which can be reached both by land and sea.

In the northern part of Santa Maria Navarrese, hikers have the possibility to move along a section with fractured granite from the Palazoic age, where rocks are several meters thick. This area contains some of Sardinia's oldest rocks, covered with layers of Cambrian-Ordovician metasandstones, phyllites and quartzites. In Pedra Longa the section with granite ends, and there is a transition to the limestones, which are a common feature of the Gulf of Orosei coast. Because of climate changes the limestone has been affected by rising and falling of sea level. Changes caused by the mixing of fresh water from the limestone and salt sea water include larger limestones cavities and fluctuations in different colours.

Grotta del Fico is a karst cave located on the Selvaggio Blu between Santa Maria Navarrese and Cala Luna. Grotta del Fico is accessible by boat or walking. It was discovered by fishermen in the early 20th century, and opened to the public with guided tours in 2003. Inside Grotta del Fico there is a lake with clear water which reflects inside the cave. The lake is created by karst water that flows in the main part of the cave and fills up the lake.

== History ==
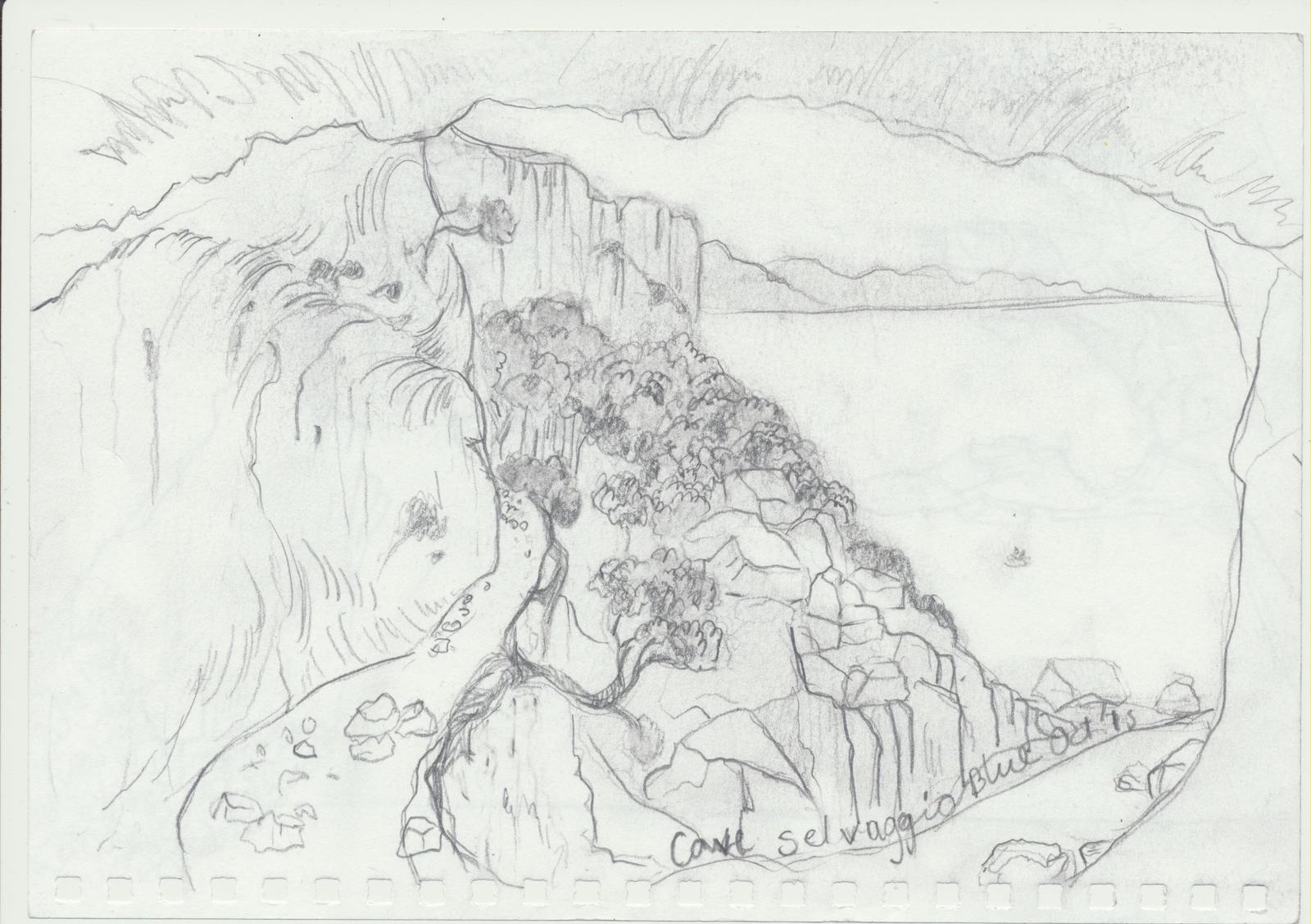
Drawing made by the alpine guide Marcello Cominetti about a passage of the Selvaggio Blu.

- 1963: Peppino Cicalò conceived the initial route after some exploratory excursions. He completed the first part of the route, leaving from Fonni and passing through Punta la Marmora to Baunei. He also thought to go through the Supramonte northwards. After meeting Mario Verin, while studying in Florence, he developed the Selvaggio Blu, with the help of his partner.
- 1981: two expert climbers, Alessandro Gogna and Maurizio Zanolla, opened the first climbing route in this area with their ascent of the Aguglia of Goloritzè, a limestone monolith on the sea cliffs. Their route traversed from Cala Luna to Baunei and is regarded as the original core of the Selvaggio Blu, although this name was not used until 1988.
- 1985: an Italian national travel magazine, Airone, featured an article by Jacopo Merizzi about the trek, publicizing it to a wider audience.
- 1986: Peppino Cicalò proposed to the mayor of Baunei to connect together the already existing treks to create a new, single longer one. Mario Verin also became interested in the wild Supramonte at this period.
- May 1987: Cicalò invited his friend Mario Verin to Santa Maria Navarrese to walk from Pedra Longa to Cala Sisine, by following the edge of the cliffs (an idea from their youth). In two days, the pair managed to get to Cala Goloritzè, naming their new trek "Da guglia a guglia". They had limited maps available, and dense macchia Mediterranea to negotiate. They attempted to identify the easiest paths to make the route accessible to subsequent visitors, requiring them to choose between including a route along the cliffs, a source of danger for non-expert climbers, or to proceed in the less scenic macchia. After this, they decided to climb up via Boladina as a part of the Golgo exploration. At the end of this trip they decided to continue their exploration the following year.
- May 1988: Cicalò and Verin returned to Baunei and completed the continuation of the route to Cala Sisine, renaming it the "Selvaggio Blu". The travel magazine Alp (n° 38/1988) also published the initial part of the route, illustrated by a detailed set of photos. Dino Barranu, Baunei's mayor at this time, understood the potential importance of this initiative to local tourism, and initiated a project emulating Corsica's trekking paths. The main purpose was to raise awareness of the region by recuperating old mule tracks, marking the track, and training local guides.

== Trek ==
Selvaggio Blu is a 40 kilometers trek that has an estimated travel time of 4 days, but many people take about 6 – 7 days, depending on experience and fitness.

Ideal Trekking Route
	Day One	Day Two	Day Three	Day Four
From	Pedra Longa	Porto Pedrosu	Cala Golorizè	Bacu su Feilau/ Padente
To	Porto Pedrosu	Cala Goloritzè	Bacu su Feilau/ Padente	Cala Sisine
Estimated Travel Time	9 h	6 h	8 h	6:30 h
Difficulty	EEA ( UIIA Scale)	EE (UIIA Scale)	IV+ ( UIAA Scale)	IV ( UIAA Scale)
Maximum height	770 m	495 m	485 m	480 m
Length	12 km	9.5 km	7.4 km	7 km

=== Day One ===
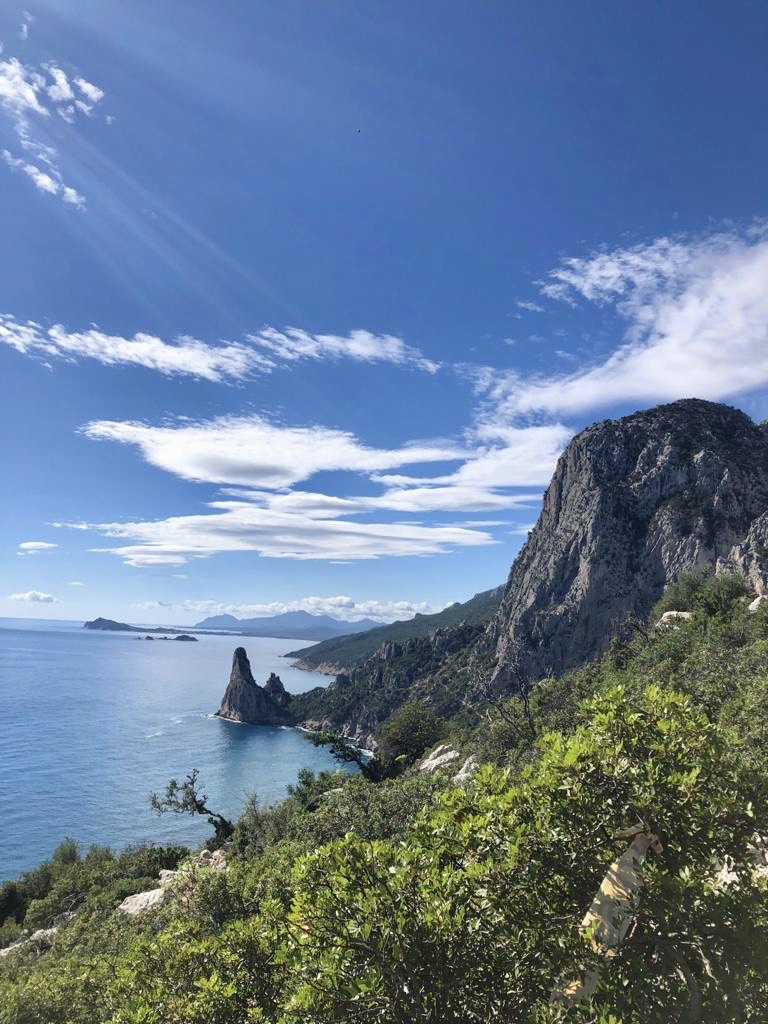
Day one: the peak of Pedra Longa and the coastal town of Santa Maria Navarrese.

The Selvaggio Blu starts at Pedra Longa (40°1'38"N 9°42'25"E) and goes to Portu Pedrosu (40°4'5"N 9°44'2"E). It has an estimated travel time of 9 hours to cover its 12 km of length. In this stage it is reached the maximum height of all the Selvaggio Blu, which is 770 m. This section gets a climbing grade of EEA on the UAII Scale, which makes this stage the third hardest in technical difficulty of the entire journey. The path crosses a small valley into the woods until it reaches a point where it is possible to see the sea. The path continues into another small valley with holm oaks, walking on very sharp limestone flakes. The path then crosses two gates, after which it descends toward the sea following the cliffs. Then, passing on the top of the Grotta dei Colombi, the path once again enters a small valley. Descending this valley, on the left there is a section equipped with juniper trunks that allow climbers to descend into Bacu Tenadili. The path at this point challenges the orientation skills of the climbers because of the lack of a GPS signal. After this section, there is a cracked limestone area where the shepherds are used to collecting water; after this the path becomes less clear. Following a steep zigzag, the path leads to the mooring of Portu Pedrosu were the first stage ends. Walking for 10 minutes more to Portu Cuau(40°5'11"N 9°43'55"E) there is a large space for camping

=== Day Two ===
The itinerary of the second day starts at Portu Pedrosu and ends in Cala Goloritzè (40°6'29"N 9°41'23"E), the maximum height reached during this day is about 495 m. This stage is 9.5 km and the estimated travel time is of 6 hours. It is not as difficult as the other paths; its difficulty has been ranked as EE on the UAII scale, which makes this the easiest technical section of the Selvaggio Blu. From Portu Pedrosu the path is well defined for a short section due to a good muletrack surrounded by vegetation. Passing a small valley, the path climbs up to a rocky plateau where the track becomes less well defined. Making a large curve towards the North, which is partially covered by the vegetation, the path follows the edge of a small valley, continuing until it reaches a balcony overlooking the sea (2 km from Portu Cuau). Keeping the sea behind, the path proceeds through small rocks and holm oak sections, until it reaches the ovile of Kenos Trainos, one of the most important along the Selvaggio Blu. From this point, the path becomes less clear because of thick vegetation and a small rocky step. Reaching Su Runcu'e su Press it is possible to escape from the Selvaggio Blu and in 15 minutes reach a clearing which is accessible by SUV.

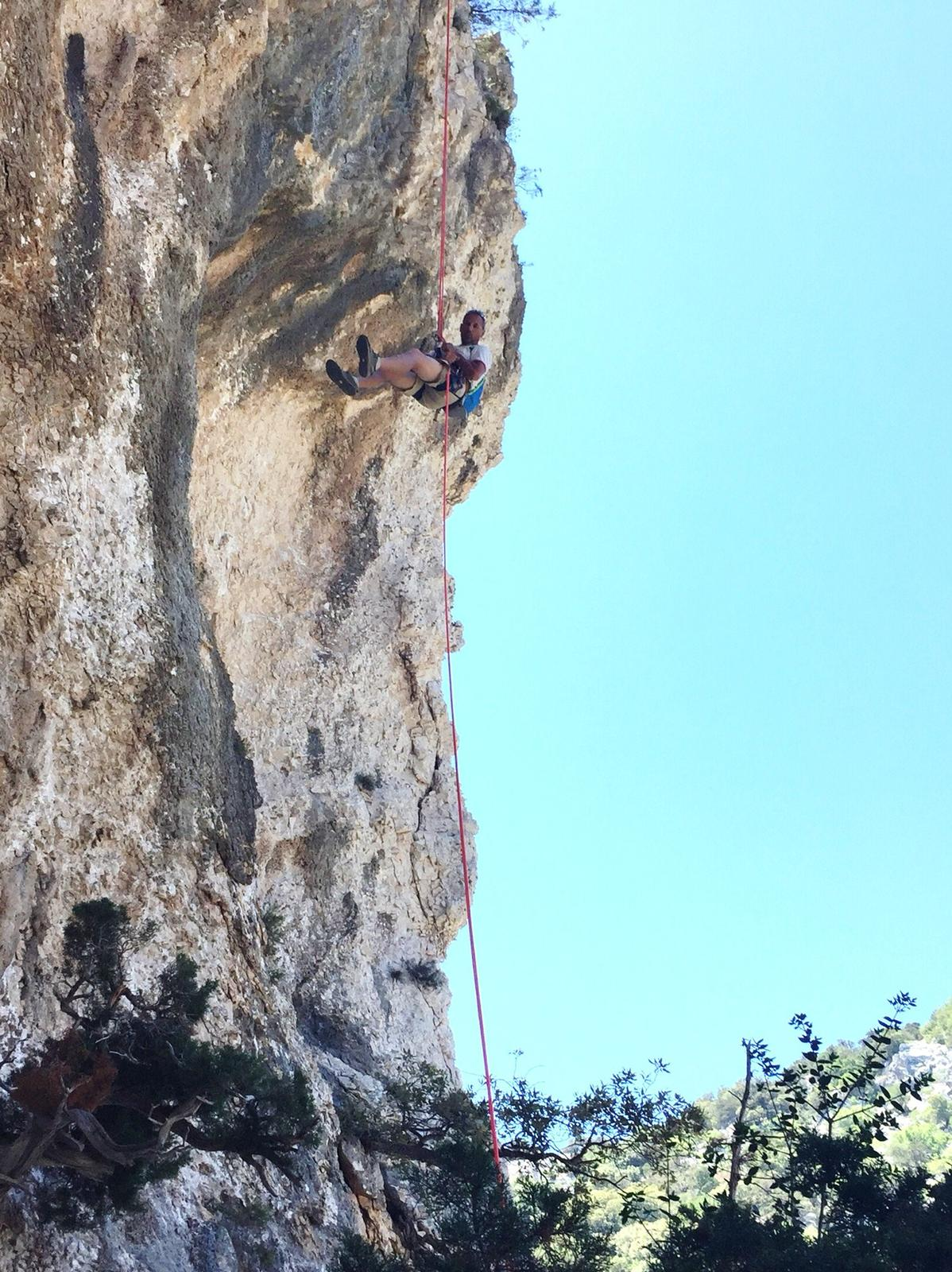
One of the two abseils encountered during the itinerary of the Selvaggio Blu's third day

=== Day Three ===
The itinerary of the third day is 7.4 km long, with a maximum height of 485 m. It is the most difficult stage of the whole route; its difficulty has been ranked IV+ of the UIAA scale. Some people decide to stop during this stage because of all the obstacles on the path to Bacu Su Feilau. This section requires the capability to travel on all types of terrain, with difficulties including the exposure, difficult vegetation, and the lack of GPS signal. During this stage, which starts from Cala Golorizè and ends in Bacu su Feilau (40°3'59"N 9°34'52"E), the itinerary climbs two rock walls, the first one of 20 meters and the second one of 4 meters. These represent the hardest technical climbing difficulties on the Selvaggio Blu. This section includes several caves and woods, and 2 abseils of 20 meters each. Bacu su Feliau, which is a big hole through the rocky spur that overlooks Bacu Padente, was originally a Bivouac shelter on Selvaggio Blu, but for large groups it is recommended to descend it and climb up towards Ololbizzi, a charcoal burners' circle in the upper part of the Bacu.

=== Day Four ===
The last day starts from Bacu Su Feliau and ends 7 km later in Cala Sisine (40°10'45"N 9°38'1"E). It offers a large variety of scenery, the highest altitude reached during this stage is 480 m. The estimated travel time is 6.5 hours and the technical difficulty is ranked IV on the UIAA scale. This makes this stage the second most difficult of the Selvaggio Blu. At the start of this stage, it is necessary to climb a juniper trunk with giant moss-covered oaks. The route then traverses a gully and is then marked with blue waymarks painted on rocks. These mark the way to exit the woods, utilizing ancient mule tracks, and gives a panoramic view of the sea. Before descending, there is the possibility to climb a cliff named "rottura delle altezze" (which means "breaking the heights") from which walkers can look at the sea 200 m below. One of the paths leads to the ovule Piddi, meaning Mandragora or Mandrake in Sards; this poisonous plant grows all over the Supramonte. Helped by the locals, Verin and Cicalò built a network of mule tracks that, with a series of bends, pass through the most impervious gullies and lead to the sea, which can be seen only in Cala Sisine; here there are docks built to transport charcoal and woods. From Cala Sisine it is possible to return to the starting point by the sea with an inflatable boat or by land with a SUV.

== Variations of Selvaggio Blu ==
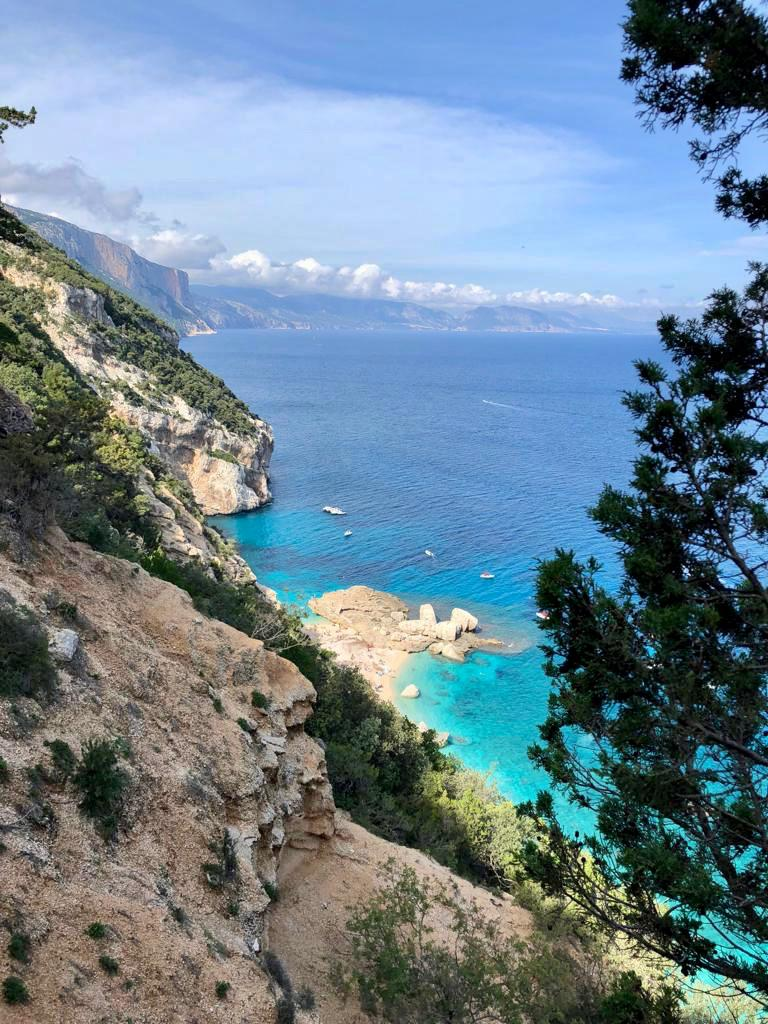
The beach of Cala Mariolu, a variation of the Selvaggio Blu

There are several different versions of the Selvaggio Blu:

- The first is the original one conceived in 1987 by Mario Verin and Peppino Cicalò that goes from Pedra Longa to Cala Sisine.
- The second one is called Selvaggio Blu+Blu (Wild Blue+Blue) conceived by the Alpine Guide Marcello Cominetti together with Explorando Supramonte in 2014. It lasts 7 days and has different variations compared to the original trek: there is a stop at Grotta del Fico and at the beaches of Cala Mariolu and Cala Biriala and a passage through Cala Goloritzè.
- The third one is called Blu Selvaggio (Blue Wild) and is considered the hardest one. It goes from North to South, in the opposite direction of the original trek, and includes passages not covered in the original one like S'istrada Longa, Ferrata di Plummare and Plummar'e Mudaloru.;
- The fourth one is called Light Selvaggio because it is easier as it does not incorporate any climbing or rappels, so does not require a high level of competence in hiking and abseiling.

There are other variations of the Selvaggio Blu as daily excursions:

	Cala Biriala	Cala Mariolu	Cala Goloritzè	Cala Sisine	Punta Giradili	S'Istrada Longa
From	Golgo(Baunei)	Golgo	Golgo	Golgo	Golgo	Margine
To	Cala Biriala	Cala Mariolu	Cala Goloritzè	Cala Sisine	Punta Giradili	Cala Sisine
Estimated Travel Time	1 h drive and 3 h walk	3 h	1:30 h	1 h drive and 45 min walk	3 h	4:30 h
Difficulty	EE (UIIA Scale)	EE (UIIA Scale)	E (UIIAA Scale)	T (UIIAA Scale)	E (UIIA Scale)	EE (UIIA Scale)
Length	3 km	6 km	3.5 km	2 km	7.5 km	11 km

- Cala Biriala: it takes about 1 hour drive and 3 hours walk (3 km) and it's a trek for skilled hikers (EE). It offers a complete view of the coast of Baunei.
- Cala Mariolu: also called from locals "Ispuligedenie" because when they first discovered the beach they thought that the sand was like snowflakes. The trek starts from the plateau of Golgo (Baunei) and goes for 6 km long, about 3 hours. There are a steep hill and arches of rocks, therefore, the hike can be done only by skilled hikers (EE).
- Cala Goloritzè: this beach is a Natural Monument from 1993, and is accessible only by swimming or walking. This trek starts from the plateau of Golgo and it takes 1 hour and 30 minutes (3.5 km) to reach the beach. The difficulty of this trek is not too extreme and can be done by hikers that have moderate skills (E).
- Cala Sisine: the trek for cala Sisine is considered one of the easiest because it takes a 1-hour drive and 45 minutes walking (2 km) along a dry river-bed. It can be done by everyone (T).
- Punta Giradili: it is a 3 hours walk (7,5 km) with a 600 m elevation. This trek is for moderately skilled hikers (E).
- S'Istrada Longa: it means " The Long Road" because it is a long hike that starts from the plateau of Margine (Baunei) to Cala Sisine (11 km). This trek is only for skilled hikers (EE).

== Curiosities ==
- During the third stage, near the first abseil, the route passes near some natural pools; here guides leave plastic containers to collect water that they can re-use for bivouacs. It is recommended not to rely only on these containers, as this water is dependent on rainfall. This place is characterized by fig trees with long branches, rocks covered with green moss and insectivores like warblers that are attracted by the insects found in humid places.
- Selvaggio Blu was initially thought by the creators, as they discussed with the council of Baunei, to be a walk that could have been done by everyone; they wanted to avoid climbing and abseiling, adding vie ferrate (that can be found in the alps) when it was unavoidable. This has not been done yet, but the itinerary has been made easier as some exposed sections had led to the fixing of ropes and chains even if it's not necessary; this compromise leaves the lack of way making (which is the major difficulty) untouched.
- It is possible to see Sardinian mouflon over the rocky steps of the itinerary of the last day. During the summer or hot days it is possible to see them in the late afternoon of the evening, while on cold days or in winter they can be seen during the day. They are well adapted to uneven ground of the mountains, because of their muscular body they can climb steep rock walls and they can run at 60 km/h. The male can weight 50 kg, while the female usually weights 25 kg; these mouflons are present in Sardinia since Neolithic times.
- Many mule tracks that could have been seen and used by trekkers have disappeared because they have been covered by dense vegetation.
- The paint of the blue waymarking in the last part of the itinerary has been recently renewed by a walker, to help other trekkers.
- Once a group walked the entire itinerary of Selvaggio Blu barefoot.
- A trekker, Nicola Bassi, winner of the 90 km Ultratrek, finished the route in only 8 hours and 10 minutes, without any external help and without stopping by to sleep or rest.
- Lonely Planet has mentioned Selvaggio Blu in its 2015 article "Italy's seven best hikes: majestic mountains, dramatic coastlines and smouldering volcanoes"
- Some transport services are offered by local companies to support the trek. The walkers who tackle Selvaggio Blu can make arrangements to receive supplies every evening, so as to be able to walk with a lighter rucksack. The equipment is usually delivered in the evening and collected the following morning. After that, it is taken to the next spot. This service is available only when the sea is not rough; under these circumstances, it would not be possible by land.

== Guides ==
The guides that conceived the trek are:

- Mario Verin: a photographer specialized in landscapes, who is also an alpinist. He focused his explorations in Sahara and in the Middle East. He studied in Florence, where he first met Peppino Cicalò, with whom he conceived the "Selvaggio Blu" in 1987. He also published books about his trips. In addition he received prestigious international awards and two special mentions at the Banff Mountain Film Festival in Canada. He was also chosen for the Biennale Internazionale d'Arte in Venice of 2011. He is helped by his wife Giulia Castelli Gattinara, an Italian reporter specialized in alpinism and archeologist.
- Peppino Cicalò: he studied architecture in Florence, where he met Mario Verin. He was named the president of the Nuoro sector of the Italian Alpine Club.

== Flora and fauna ==
In the first stage of Selvaggio Blu, oleanders find their ideal habitat and a limestone plateau characterise all the area. True natural monuments as holm oaks can be easily found. The path is coloured by the bushy euphorbias (Euphorbia dendroides). Snakes are integral parts of the fauna, as for example biacco (coluber viridiflavus).

In the second stage the cistus (rockrose) can be found in numerous pink and white varieties.

Ferula is a plant of the family Apiaceae that are in the third stage of Selvaggio Blu.

During the fourth part of the path the possibility to find shepherds is very high because of the great number of ovili. Goats are basic animals of the fauna.

Sardinian mouflon can also be seen.

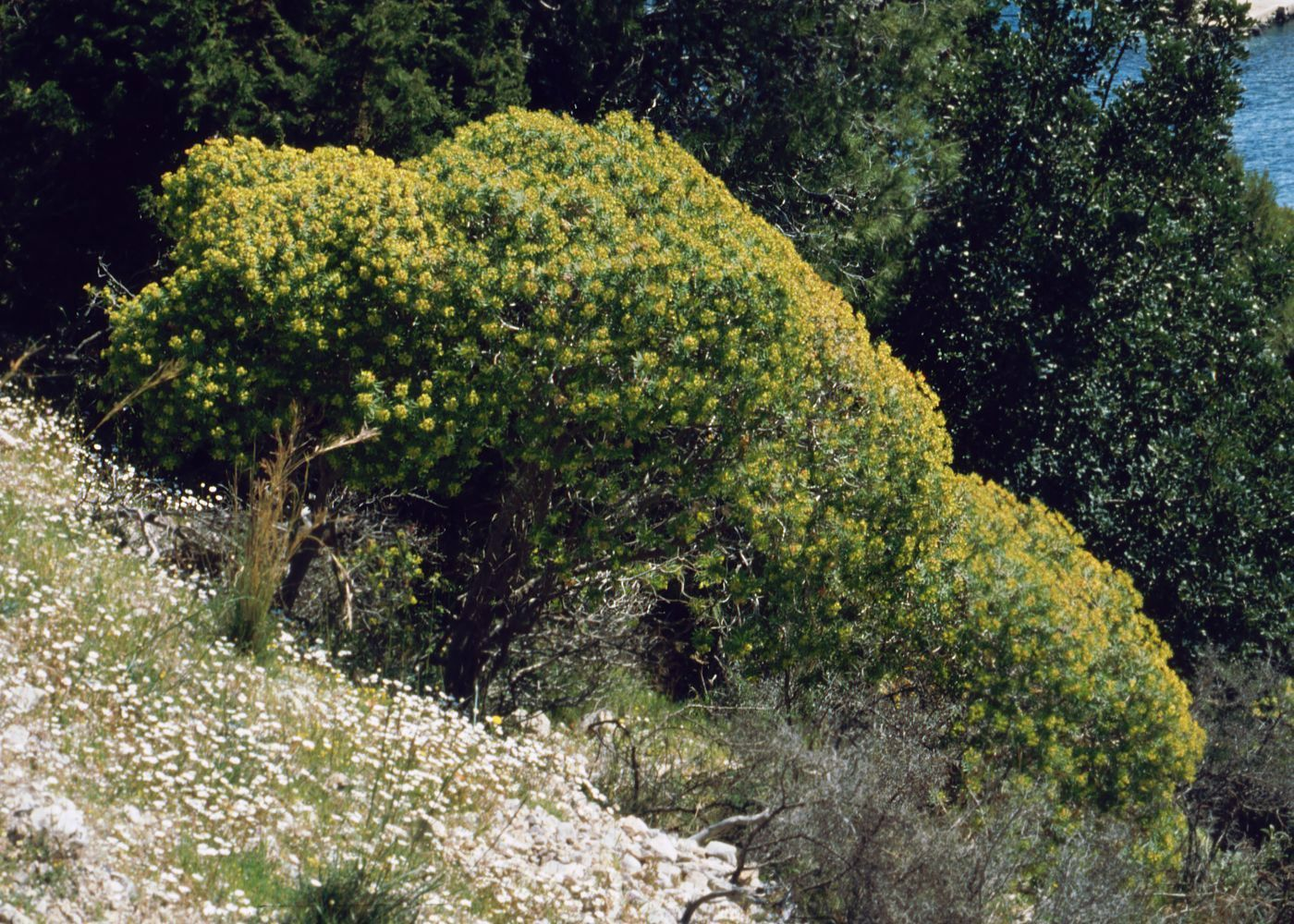
Euphorbias dendroides

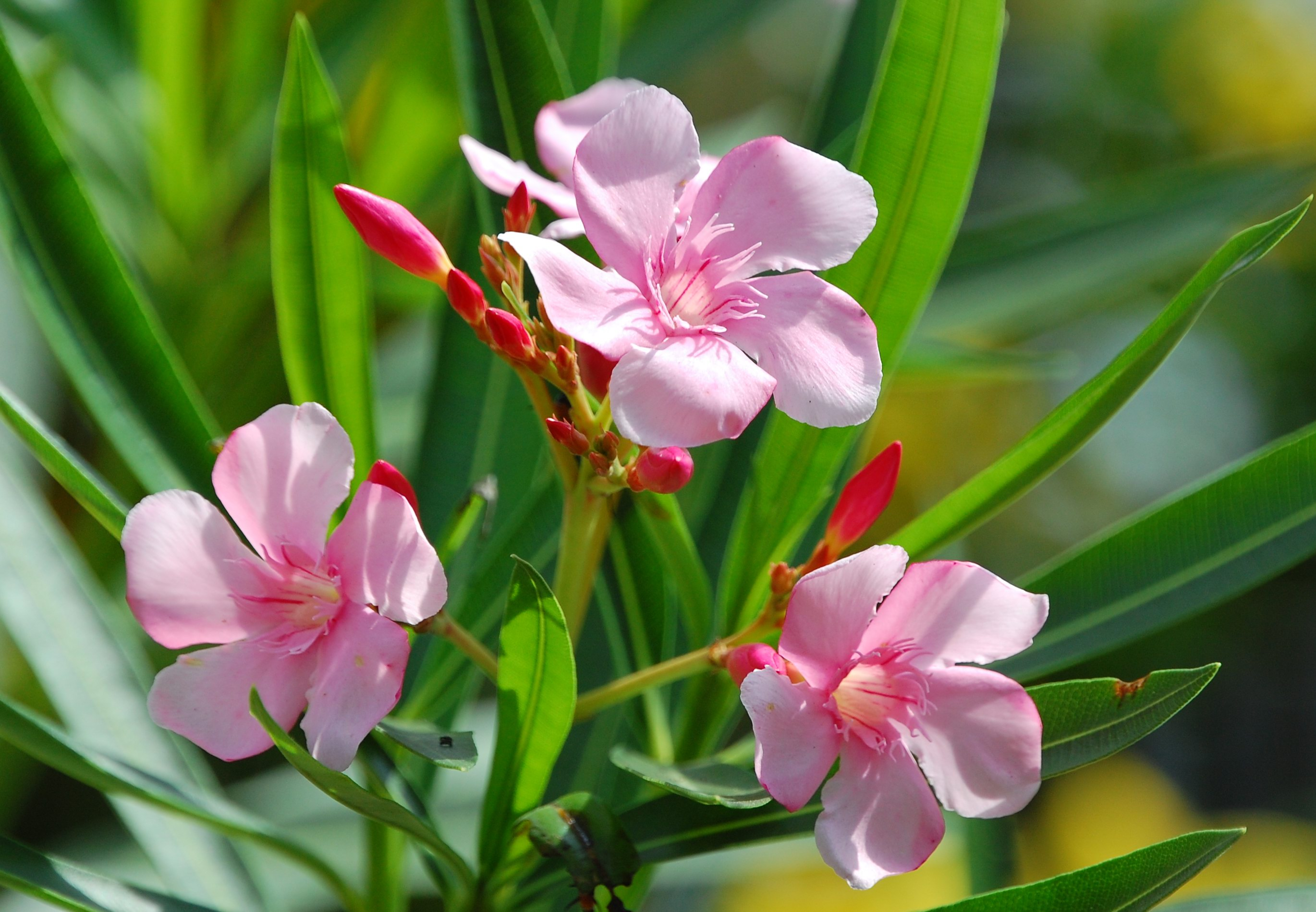
Oleander

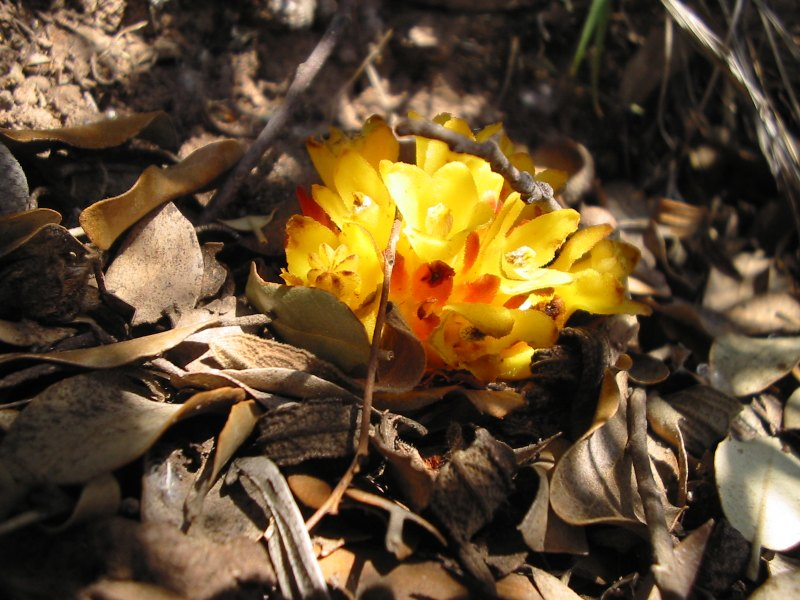
Cytinus Hypocistis

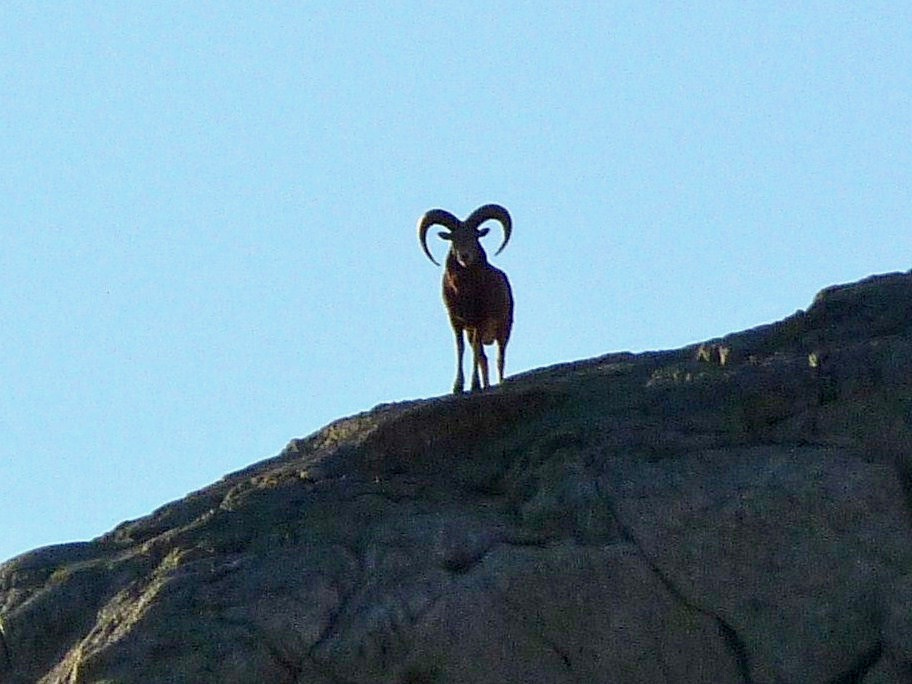
Sardinian muflon

== Books ==
There are many books and guides about Selvaggio Blu. These include:

- Baunei Sentieri. Carta Escursionistica, Parco Naturale di Baunei, by Peppino Ciccalò and Mario Verin, 1989: gives, in brief, some information about the trek.
- Guida ai Sentieri di Selvaggio Blu, by Mario Verin, Giulia Castelli and Antonio Cabras, 2016: information about 41 paths located in Sardinia.
- The book of Selvaggio Blu, by Mario Verin and Giulia Castelli, 2013: detailed guide to the entire trekking route, with supporting images.
- The map of Selvaggio Blu, by Mario Verin and Giulia Castelli, 2014: this map reproduces in a scale 1:15.000 the geographic area crossed by Selvaggio Blu, and presents the GPS waypoints of the entire path.
- Explorando Supramonte, Guide and Services for hiking in Sardinia, by Manu Ti, 2018: a guide for hiking in Sardinia.
- Il Sentiero Selvaggio Blu, by Corrado Conca, 2007: a detailed description of the four stages, illustrated by coloured pictures.

== Gallery ==
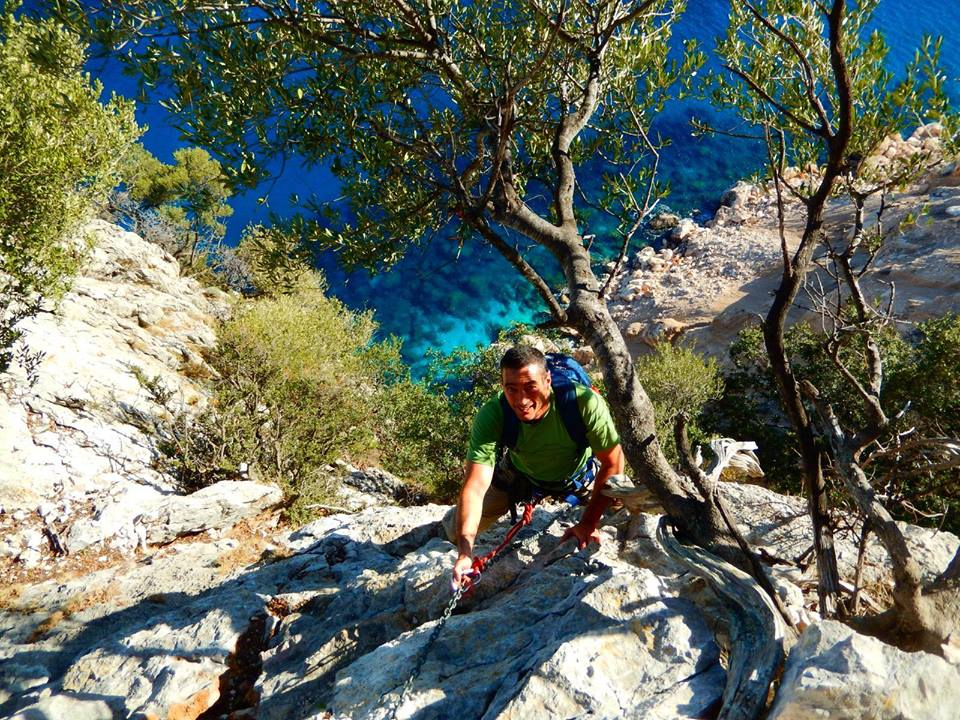
A climber of the Selvaggio Blu

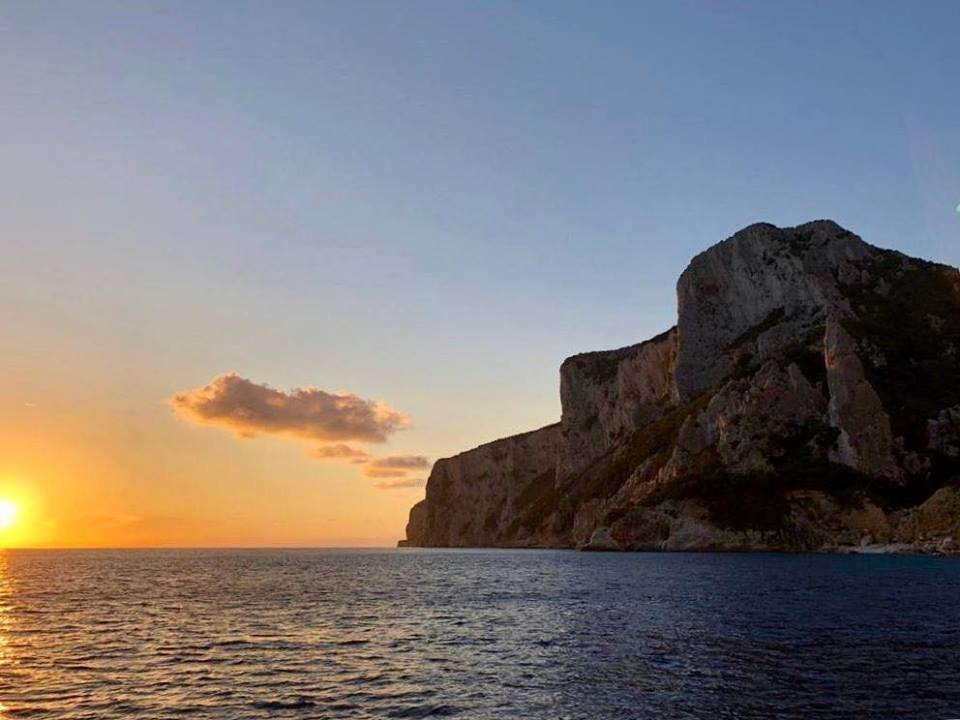
The sunset at the beach of Cala Goloritzè, second stop of the Selvaggio Blu

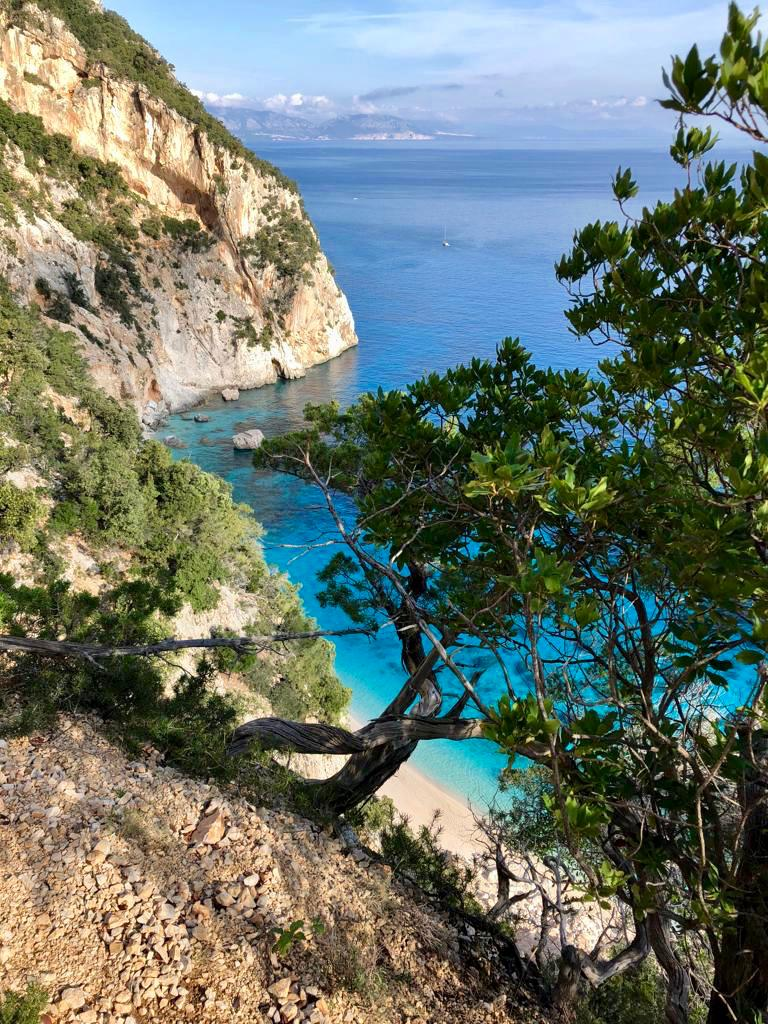
The beach of Cala Mariolu seen from the path of Selvaggio Blu

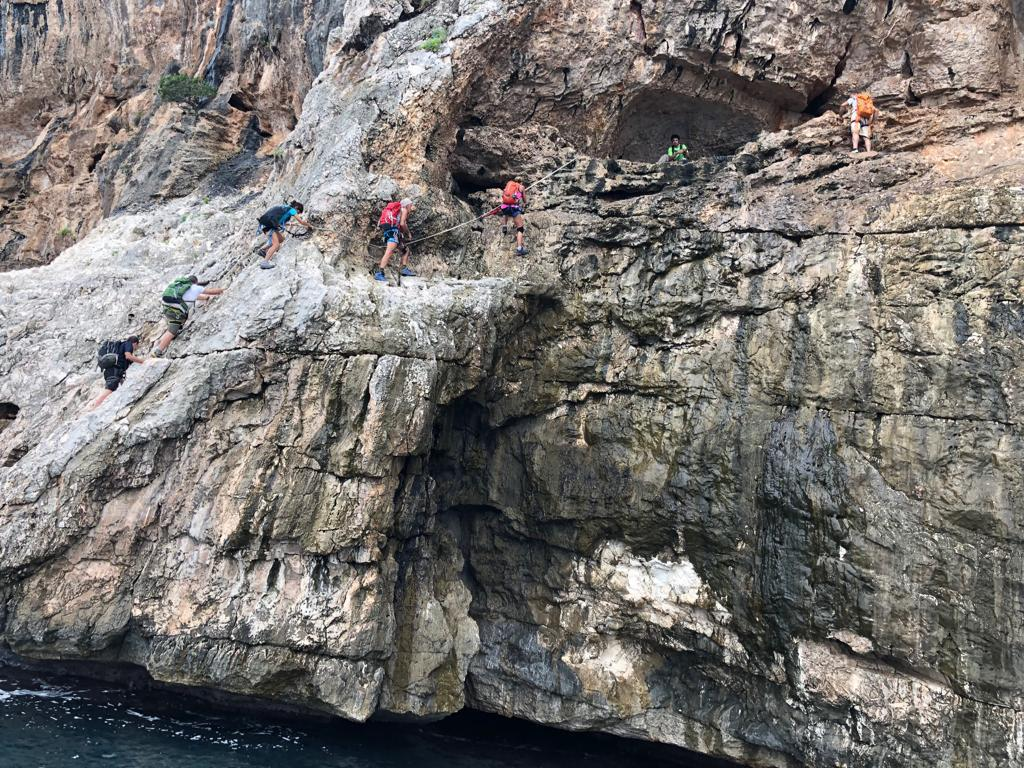
Climbers seen from the sea

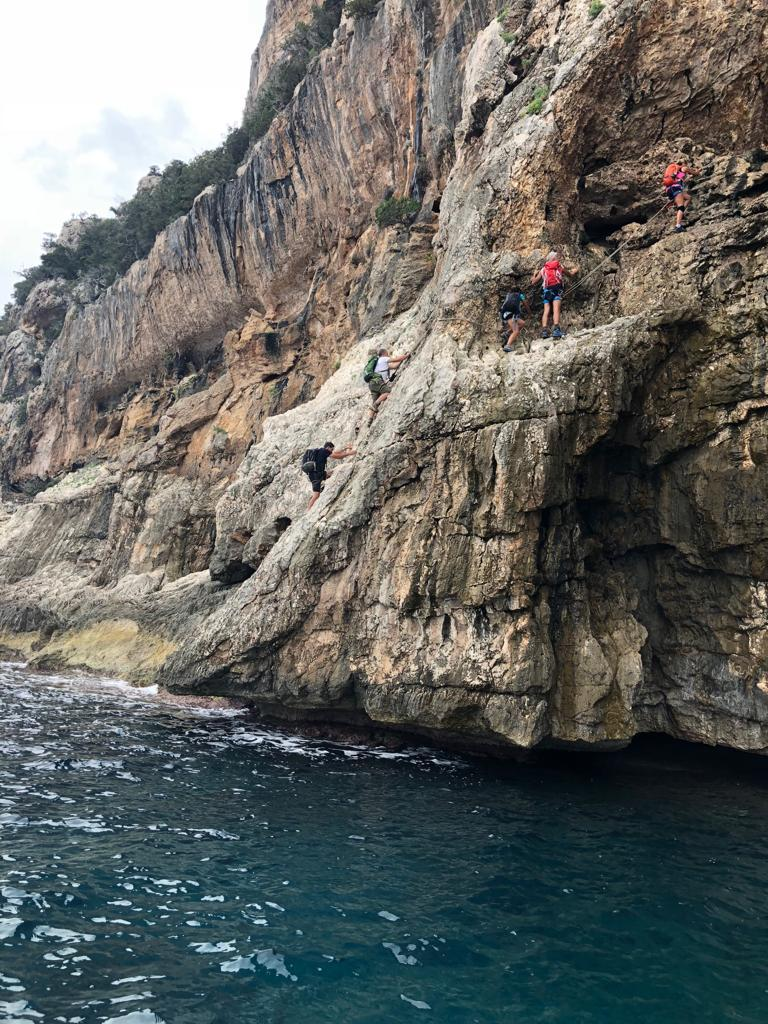
A Selvaggio Blu passage from day three

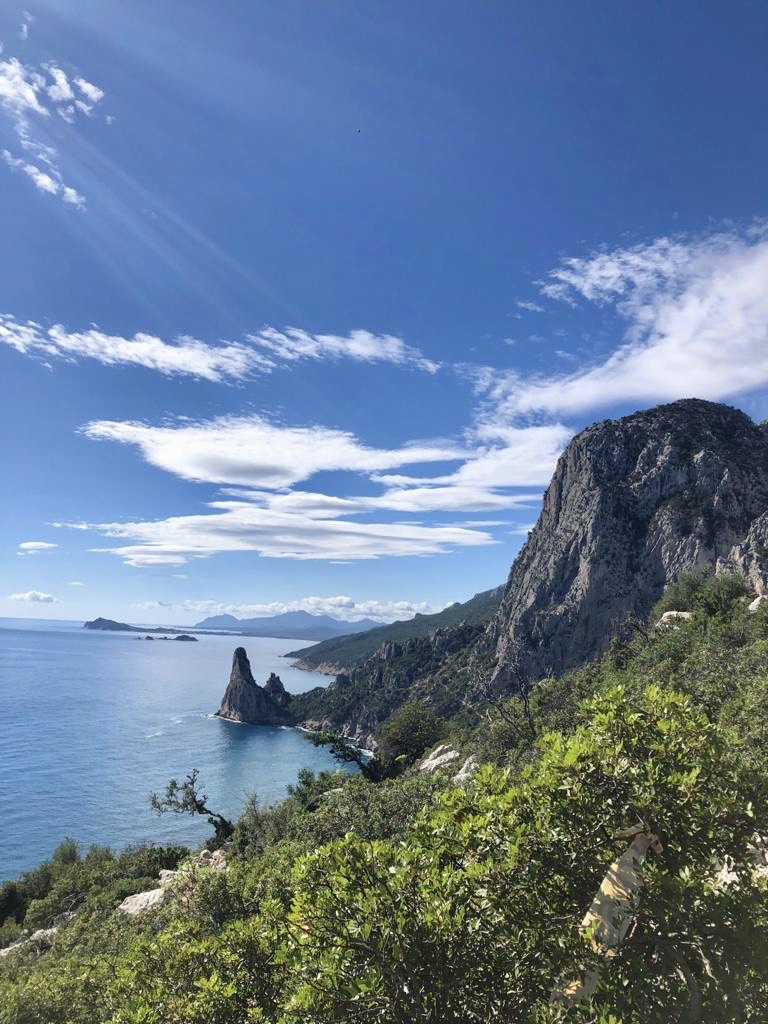
The peak of Pedra Longa and the Isolotto d'Ogliastra

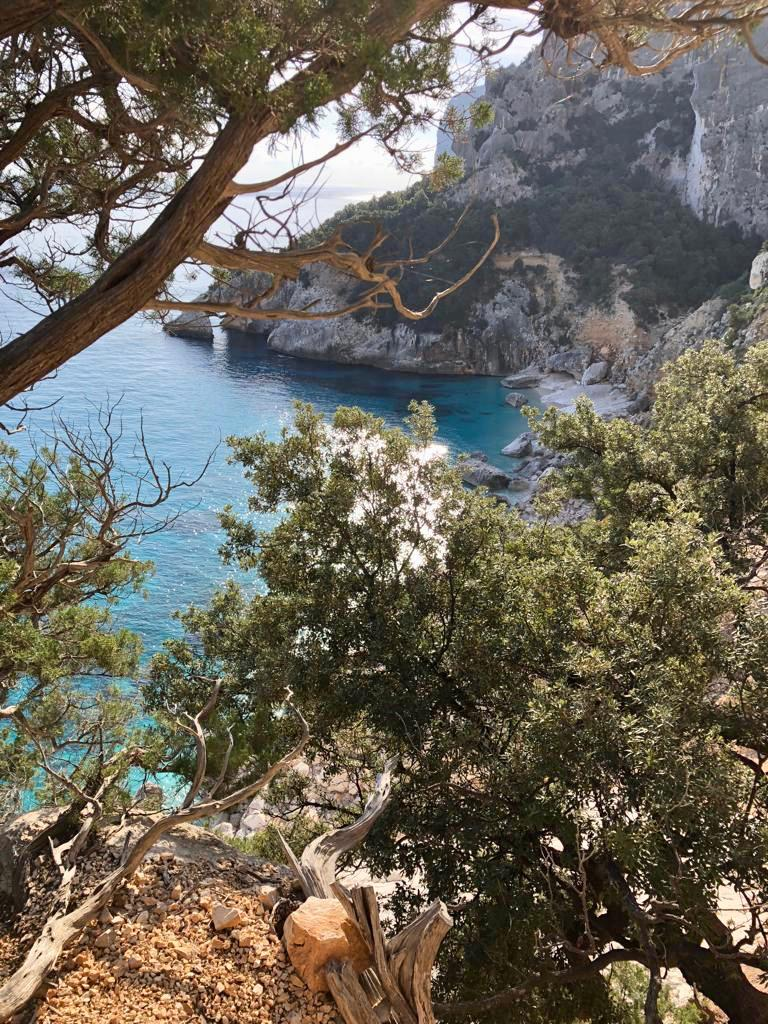
The beach of Cala Goloritzè

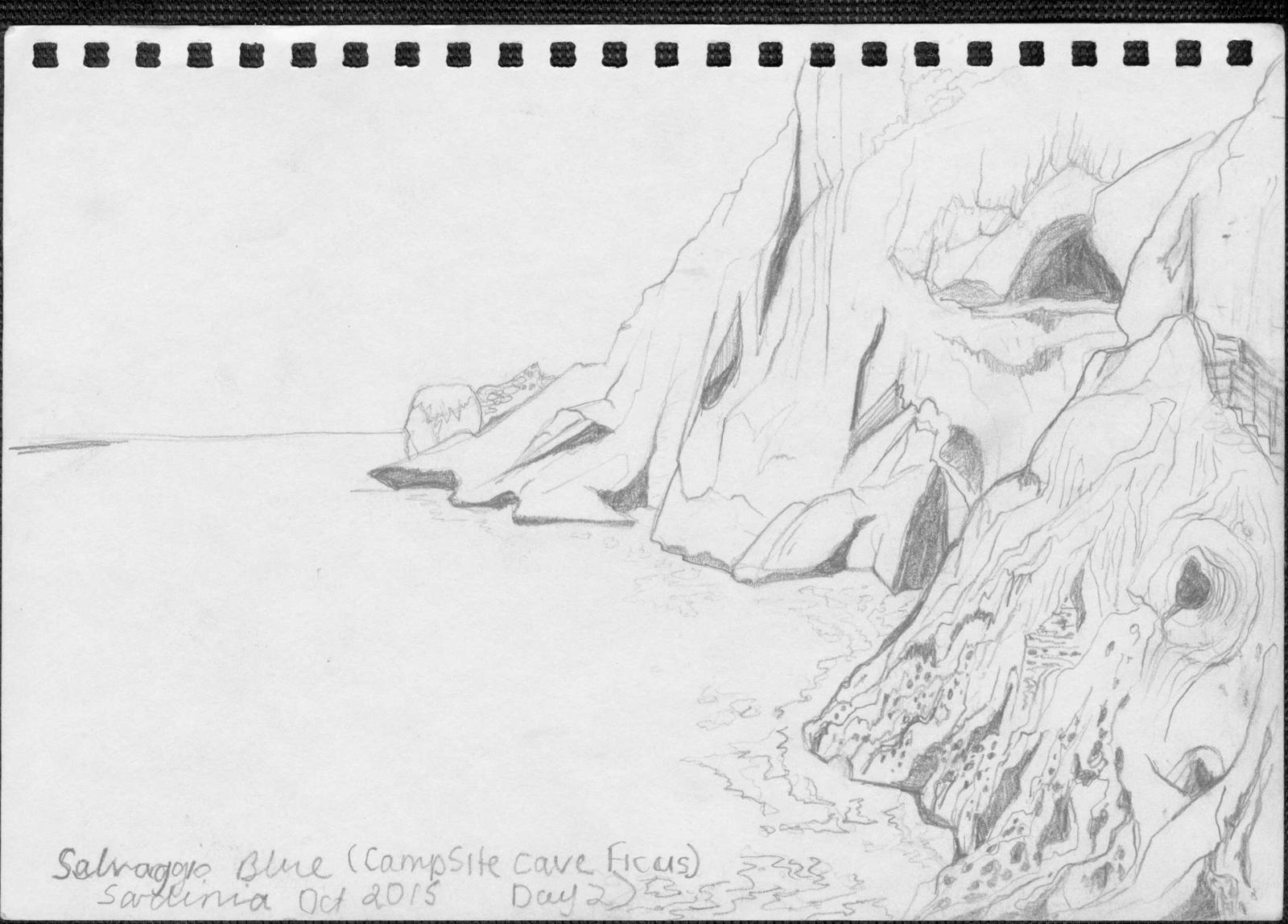
Marcello Cominetti's drawing of a campsite near the "Grotta del Fico" (Fico's Cave)

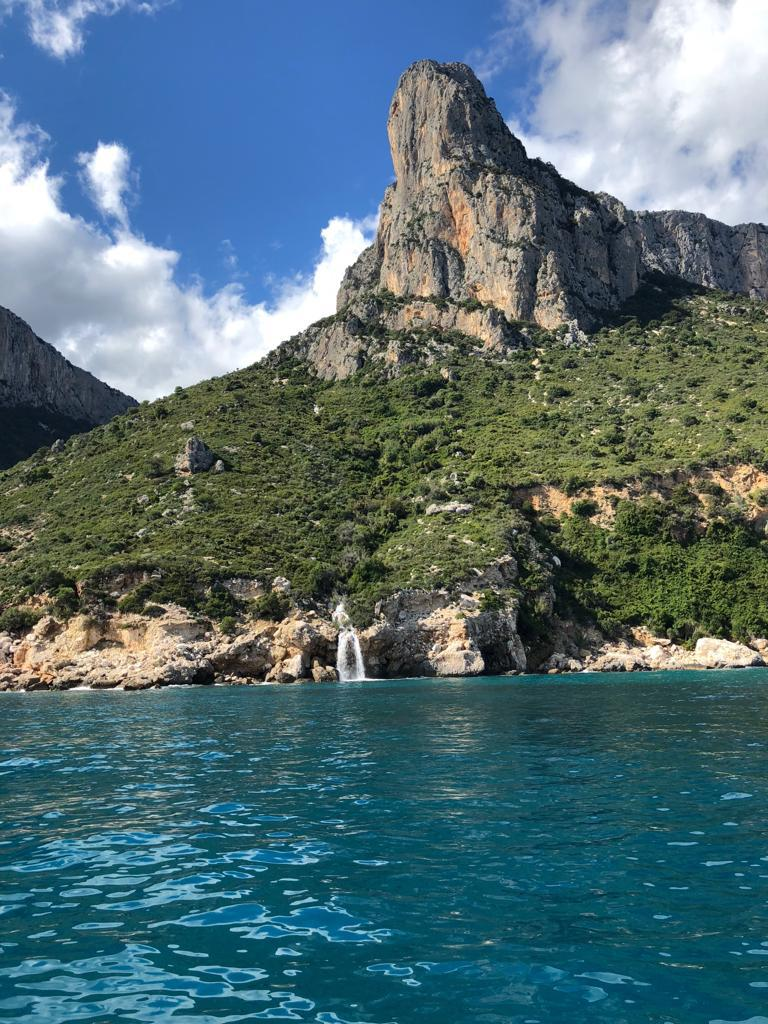
Baus' waterfall, which can be seen only in autumn or in winter

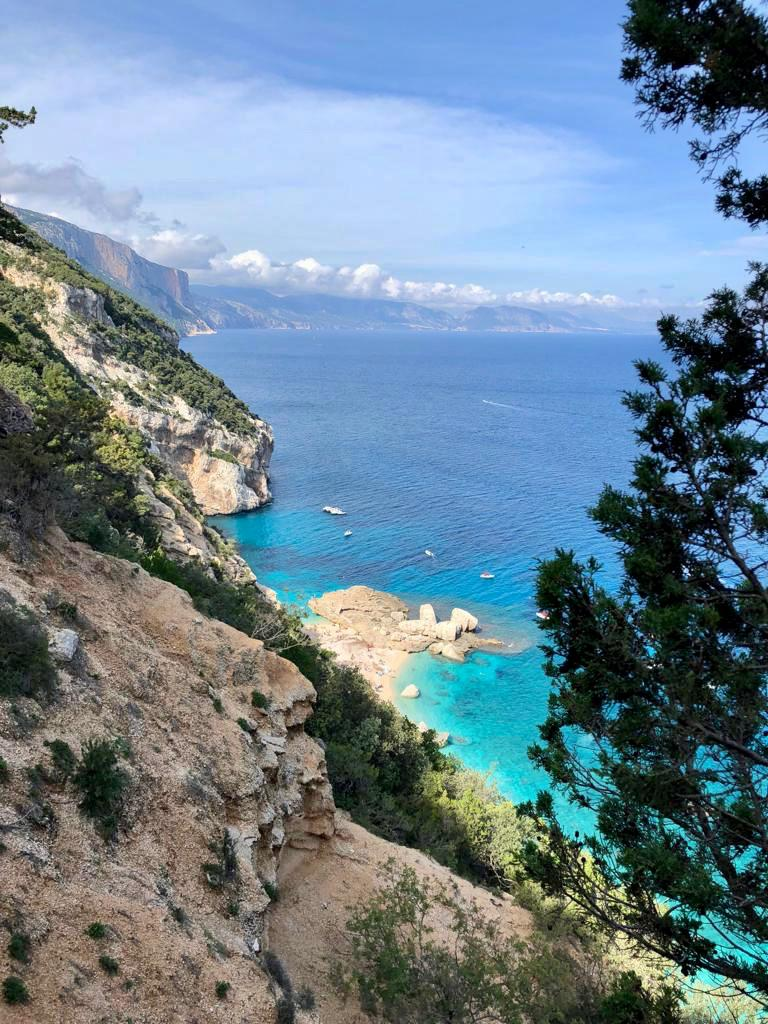
The beach of Cala Mariolu, a variation of the Selvaggio Blu

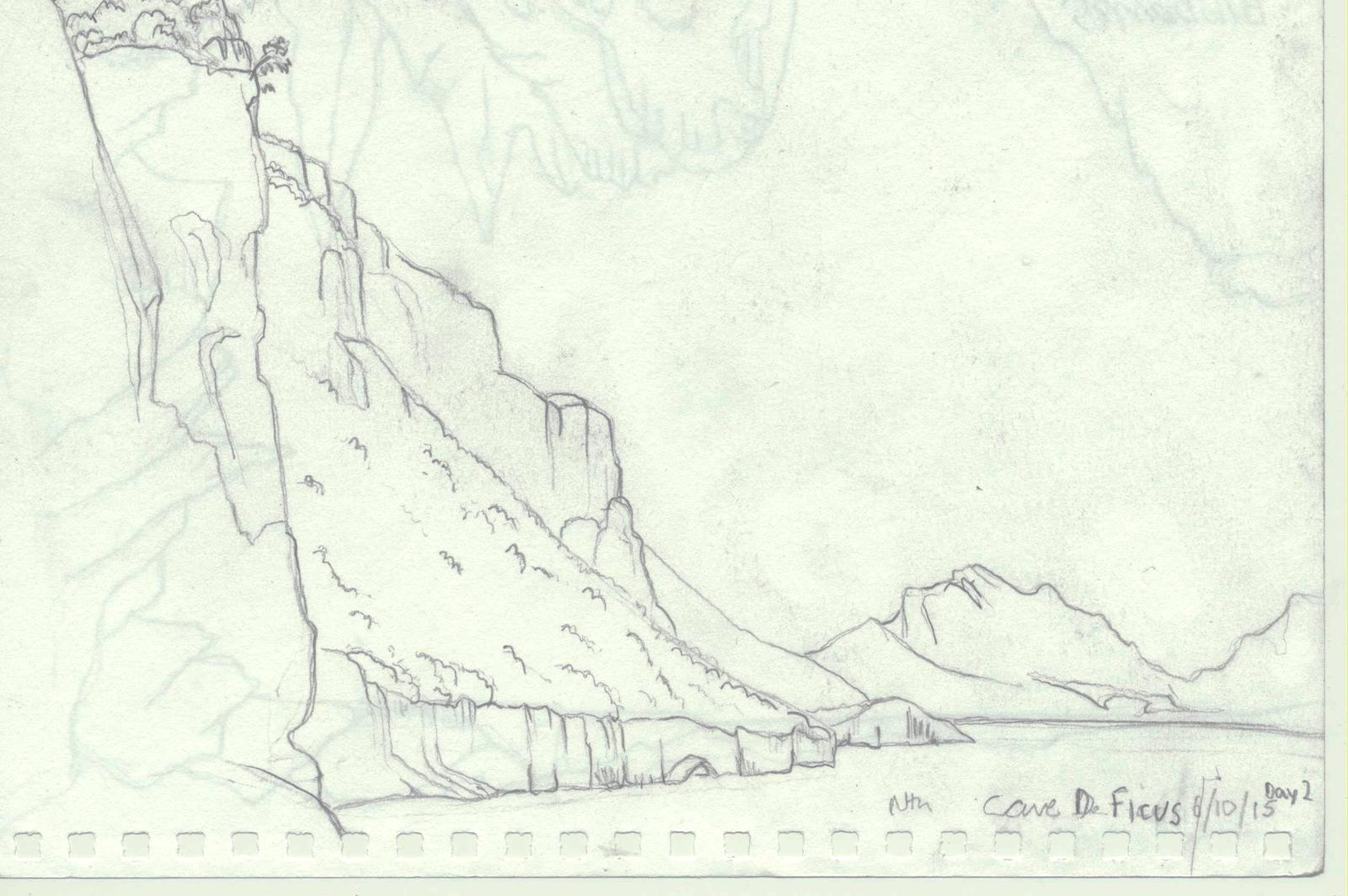
Marcello Cominetti's drawing of the "Grotta del Fico" (Fico's Cave) from the sea

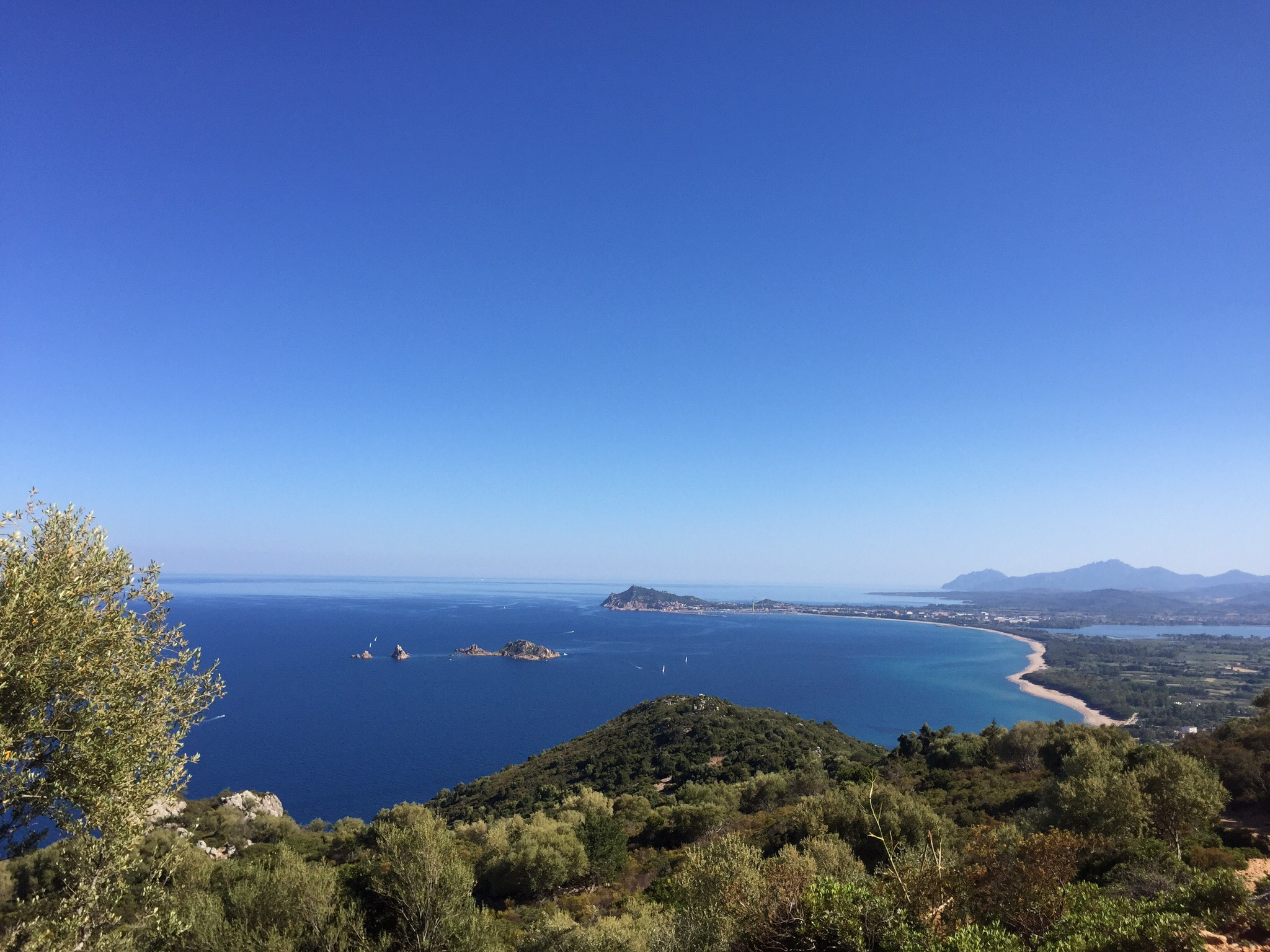
The Gulf of Arbatax seen from the mountains of the territory of Baunei, which is the first part of the Selvaggio Blu.

.

== Similar treks ==
Selvaggio Blu is not the only trekking route that you can find in Sardinia. There are 5 more trekking routes called:

- "Traversata del Golfo di Orosei"
- "Grande Traversata del Supramonte"
- "Sentiero costiero dell'Inglesiente".
- "Gola di Gorroppu"
- Path of 100 Towers

== See also ==
- Hiking
- Hiking equipment
- Outdoor recreation
- Climbing
- Abseiling
- Sardinia
- Santa Maria Navarrese
- Baunei
- Ogliastra
- List of tourist attractions in Sardinia
- Mediterranean woodlands and forests
- Cala Goloritzè
- Italian Alpine Club
- Via Ferrata
