= Cala Goloritzé =

Beach in Italy

Coordinates: 40.1086°N 9.6889°E

Cala Goloritzè is a beach that is located in the town of Baunei, in the southern part of the Gulf of Orosei, in Ogliastra, Sardinia.

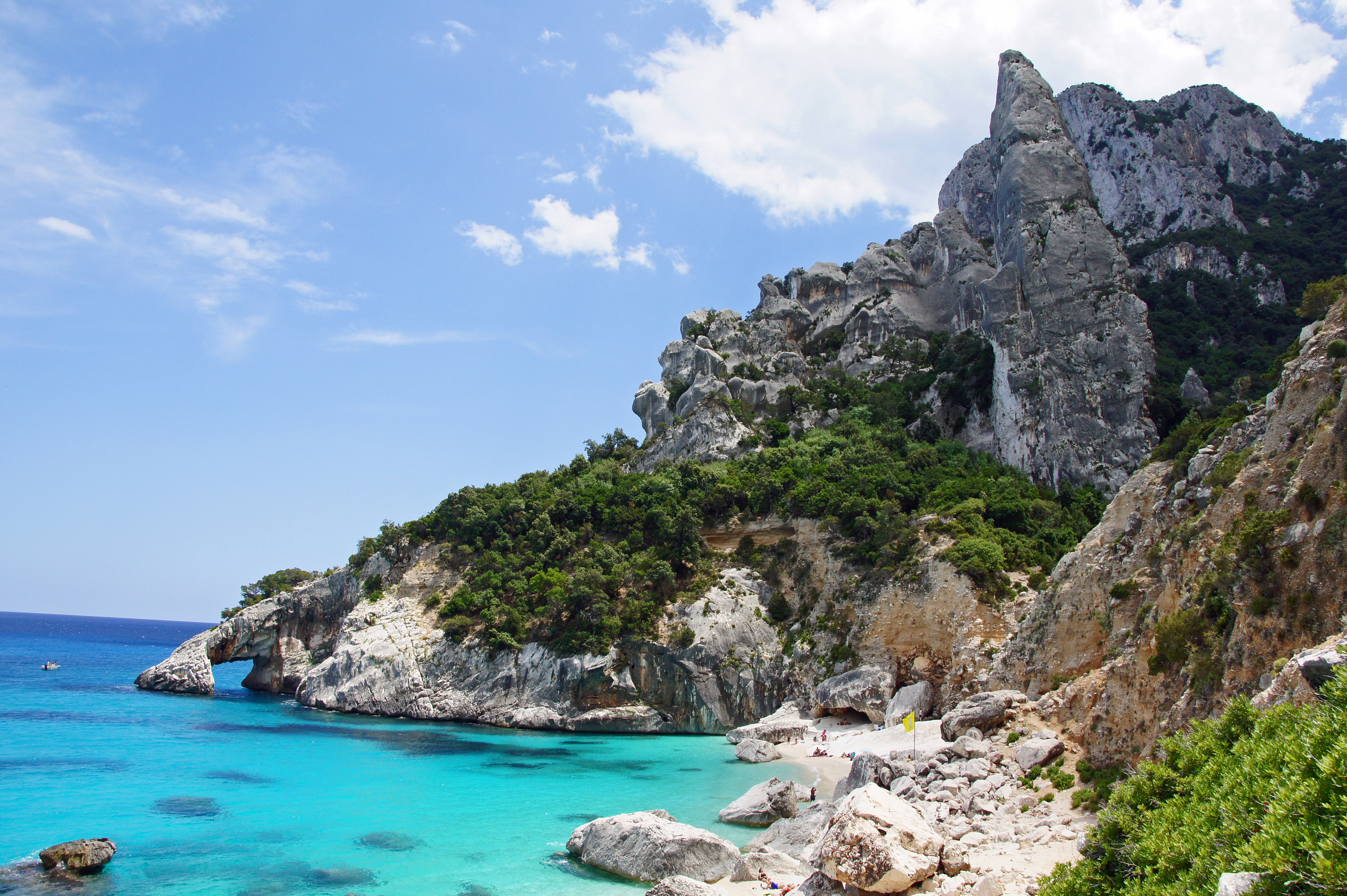
Cala Goloritzé.

The beach, one of the most evocative of Sardinia, was created by a landslide in 1962; it is famous for its high pinnacle of 143 meters above the cove. Another feature of the beach is the natural arch that opens on the right side of the bay. The beach is composed of small white pebbles and sand.

Goloritzé can be reached by boat, or by a path that from the Gulf reaches the cove, with a vertical drop of 470 meters and about an hour and a half walk. Currently (summer 2007) the coast near the beach (200 m from the shore) is completely closed to traffic of motorboats to preserve the beach from pollution and from the assault of tourists. To get to the beach by sea, the most comfortable and less demanding, available transport services are rental boats from the nearby ports of Arbatax and Santa Maria Navarrese (frazione of Baunei).

Goloritzè was declared "Natural Monument" of the Region of Sardinia in 1993, and then named "Italian National Monument" in 1995.

Cala Goloritzé is one of the stops on the Selvaggio Blu (Sardinia) trekking route.

An Italian trust is entitled to collect an entrance fee. Up to 300 people a day are allowed in, whereas 800 people are willing to come in during peak season. In order to access the walking path you are required to register online at least one day in advance. Price is 7€ per person (2024 price). Up to 1800€ a day are collected, which enables to "protect and clean" a 150m x 30m beach.

== Gallery ==
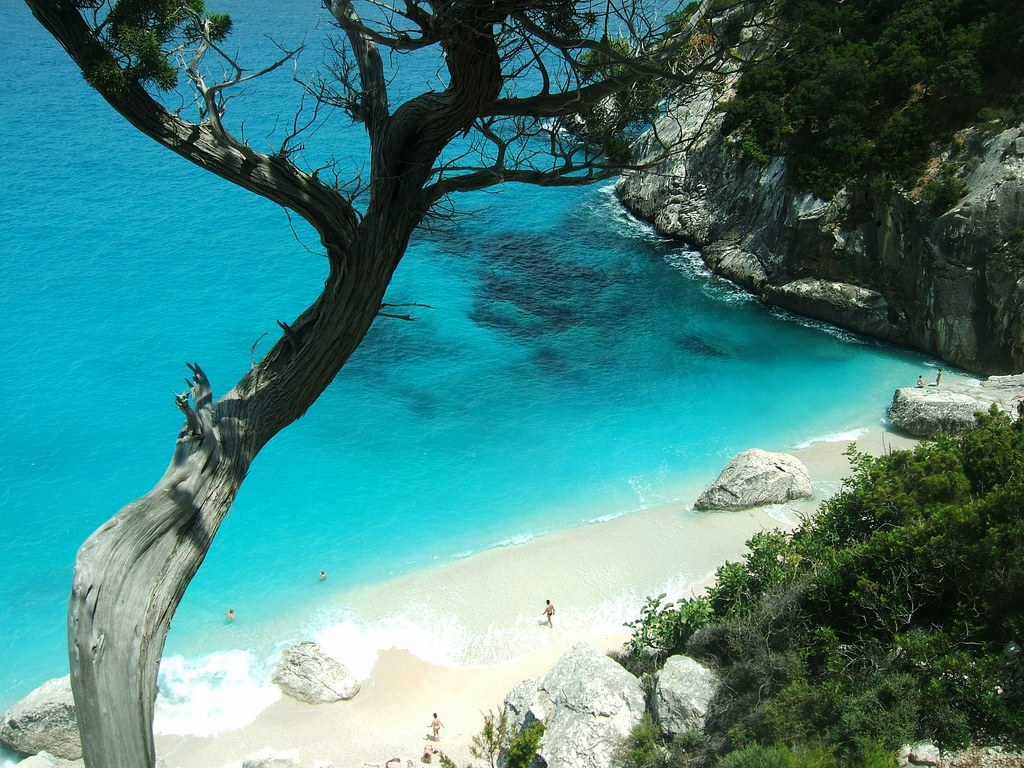

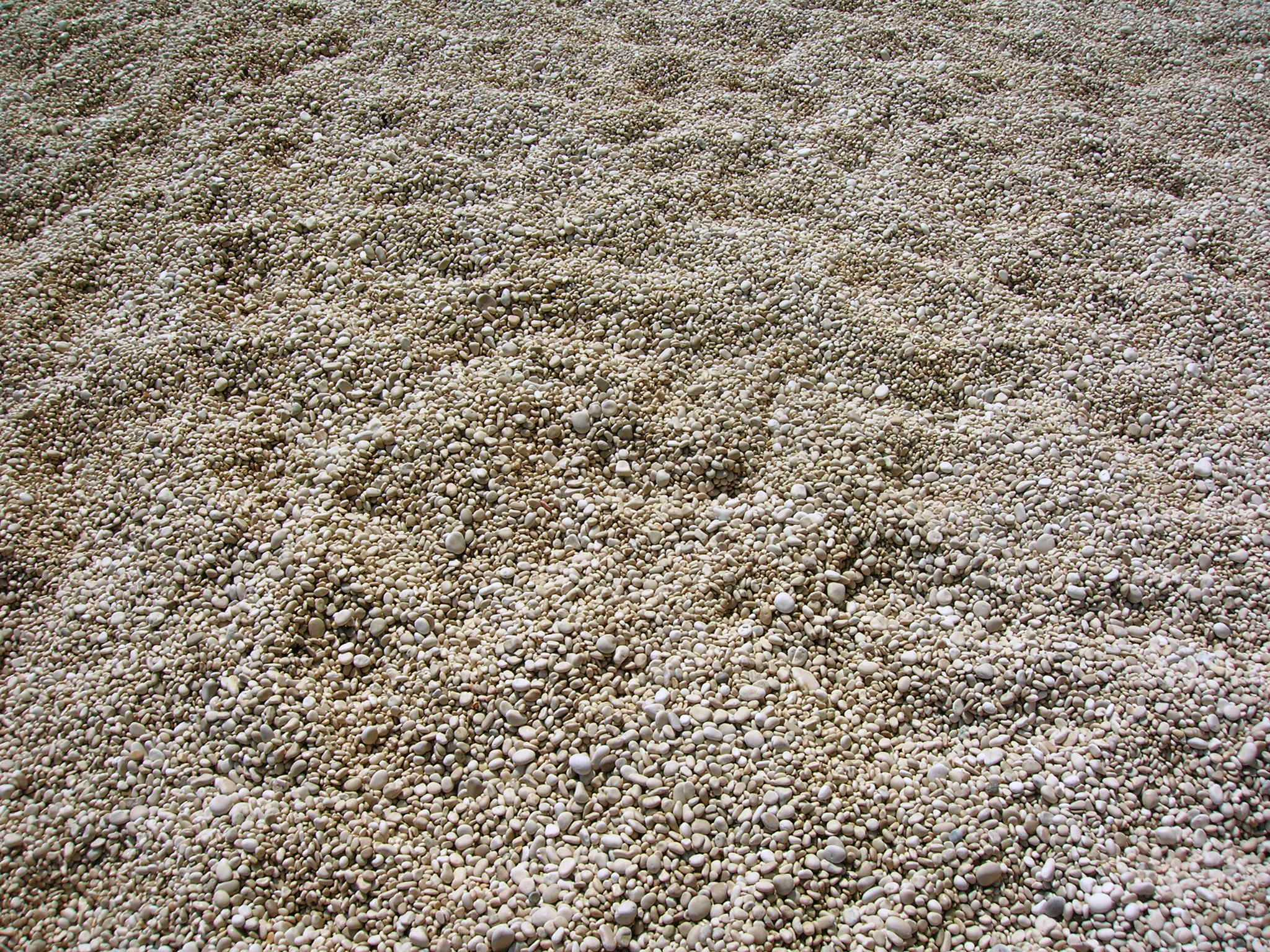

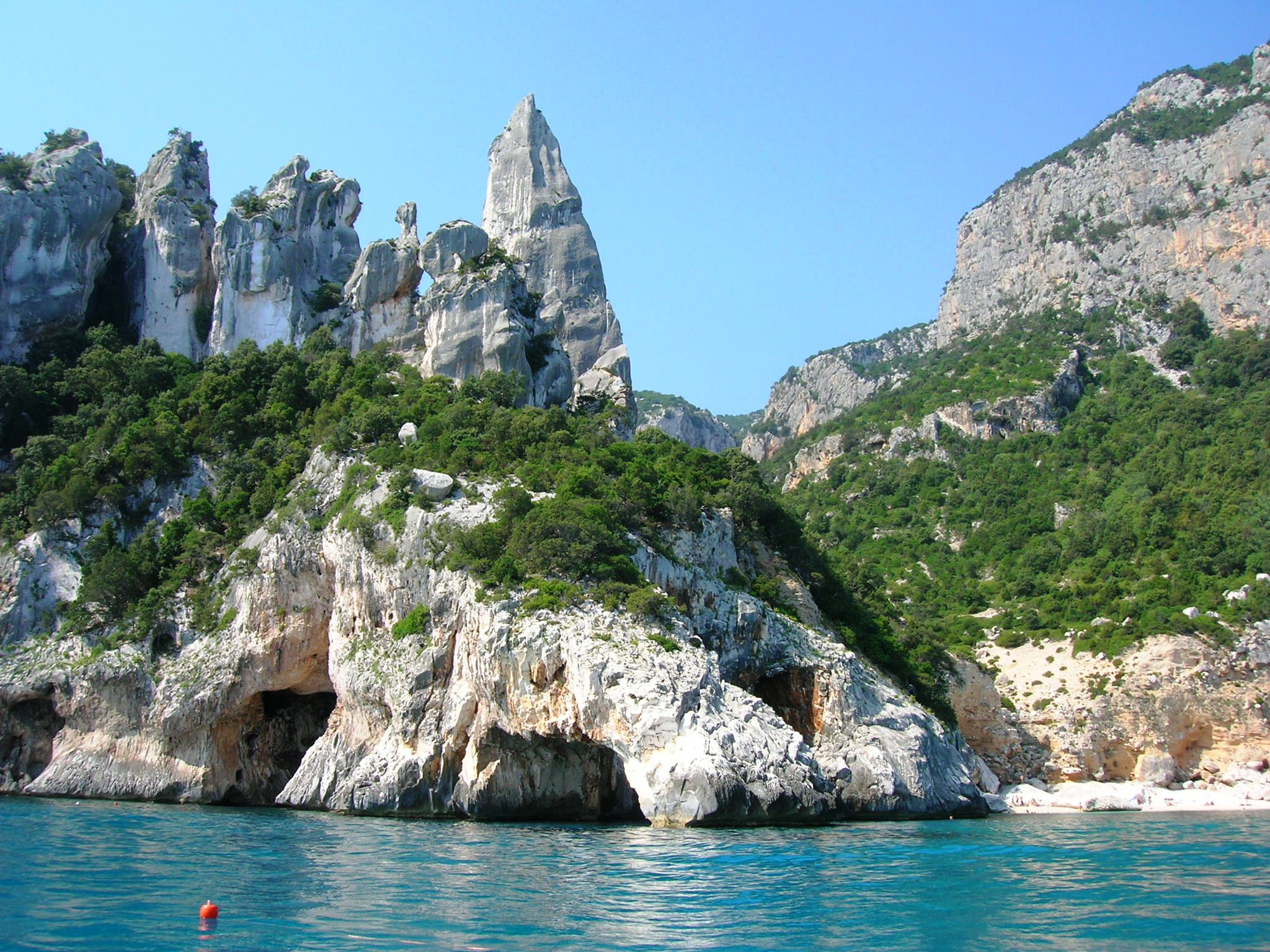

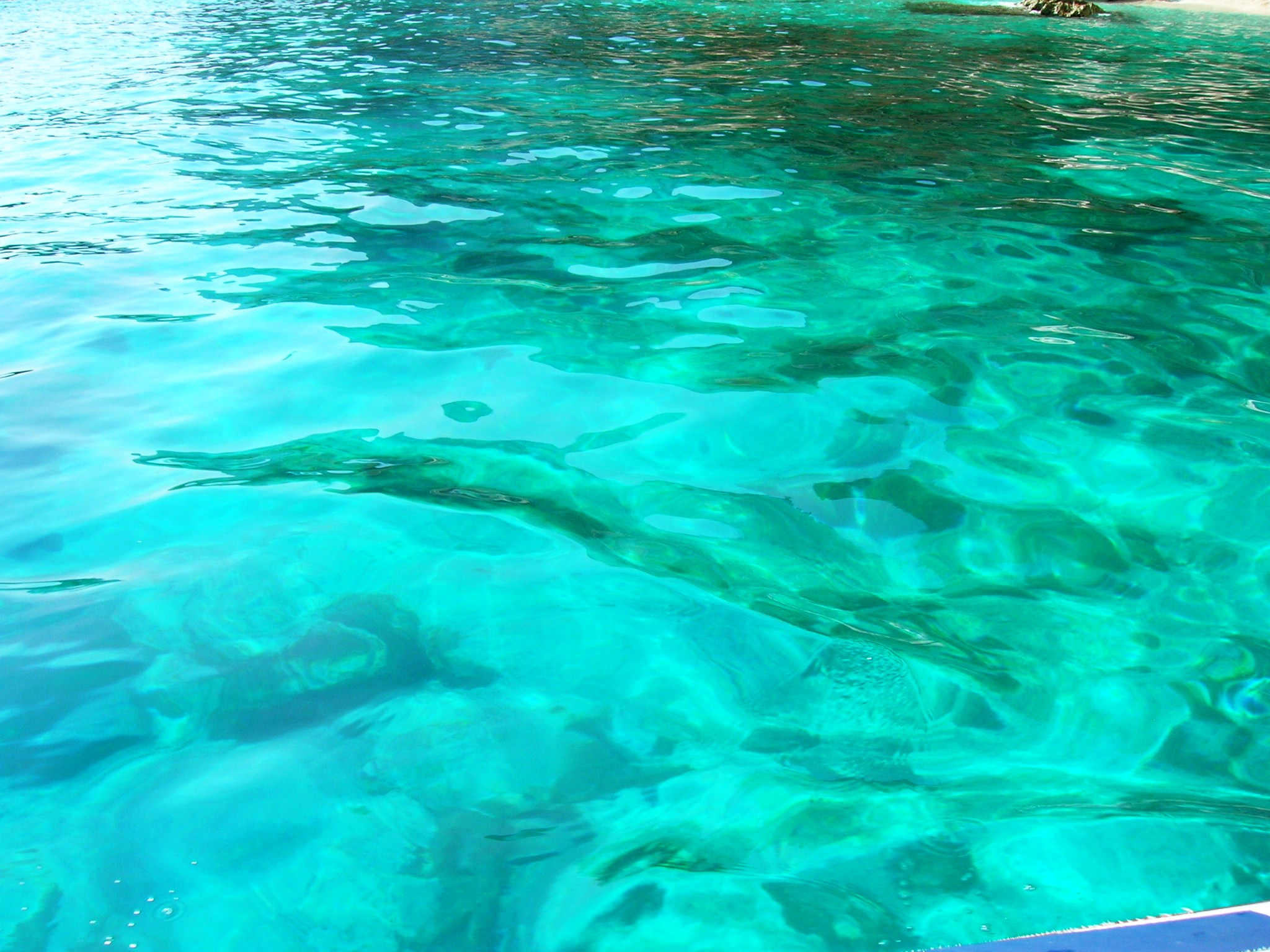

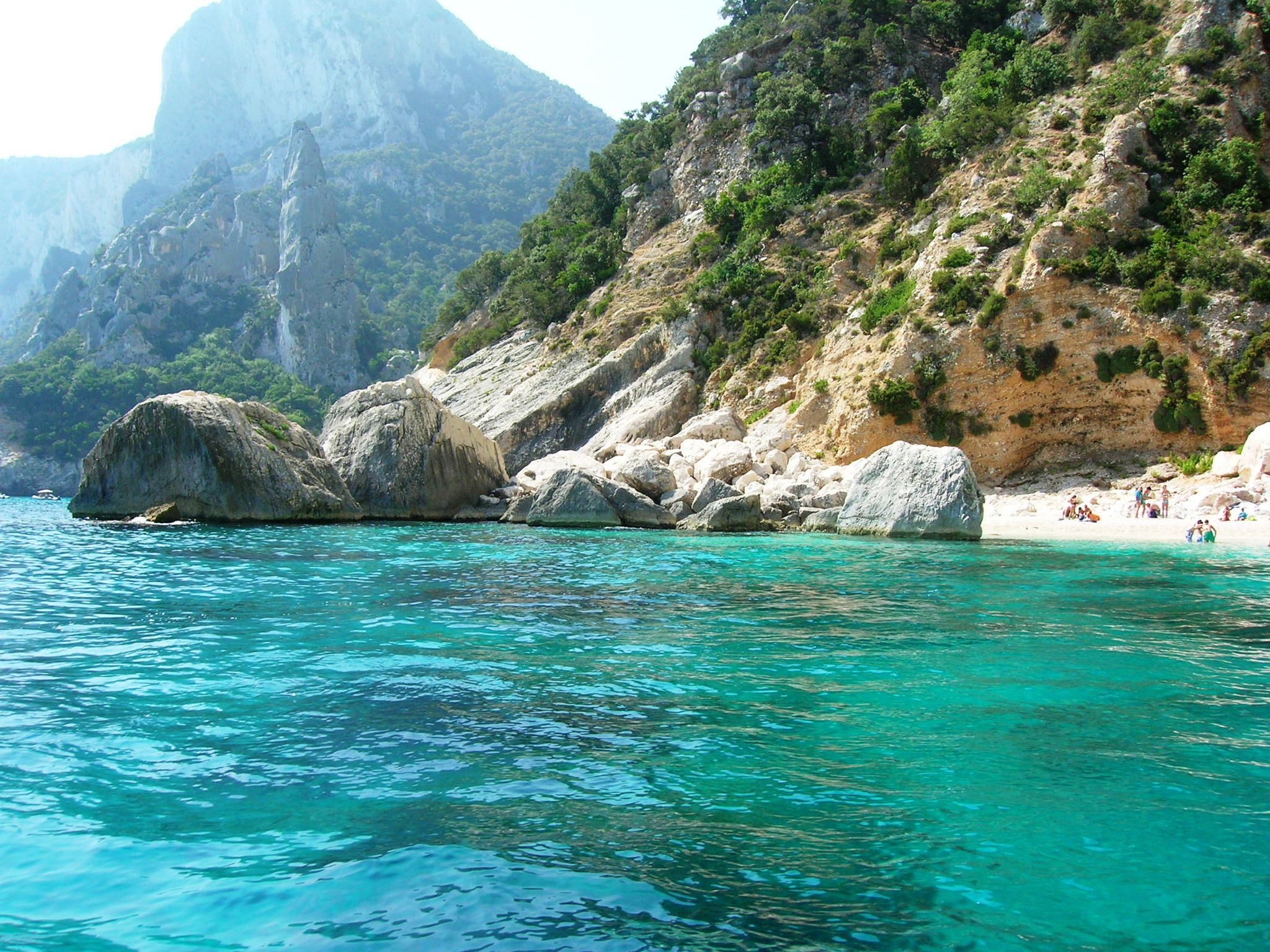
