= Baunei =

- Comune
- Comune di Baunei
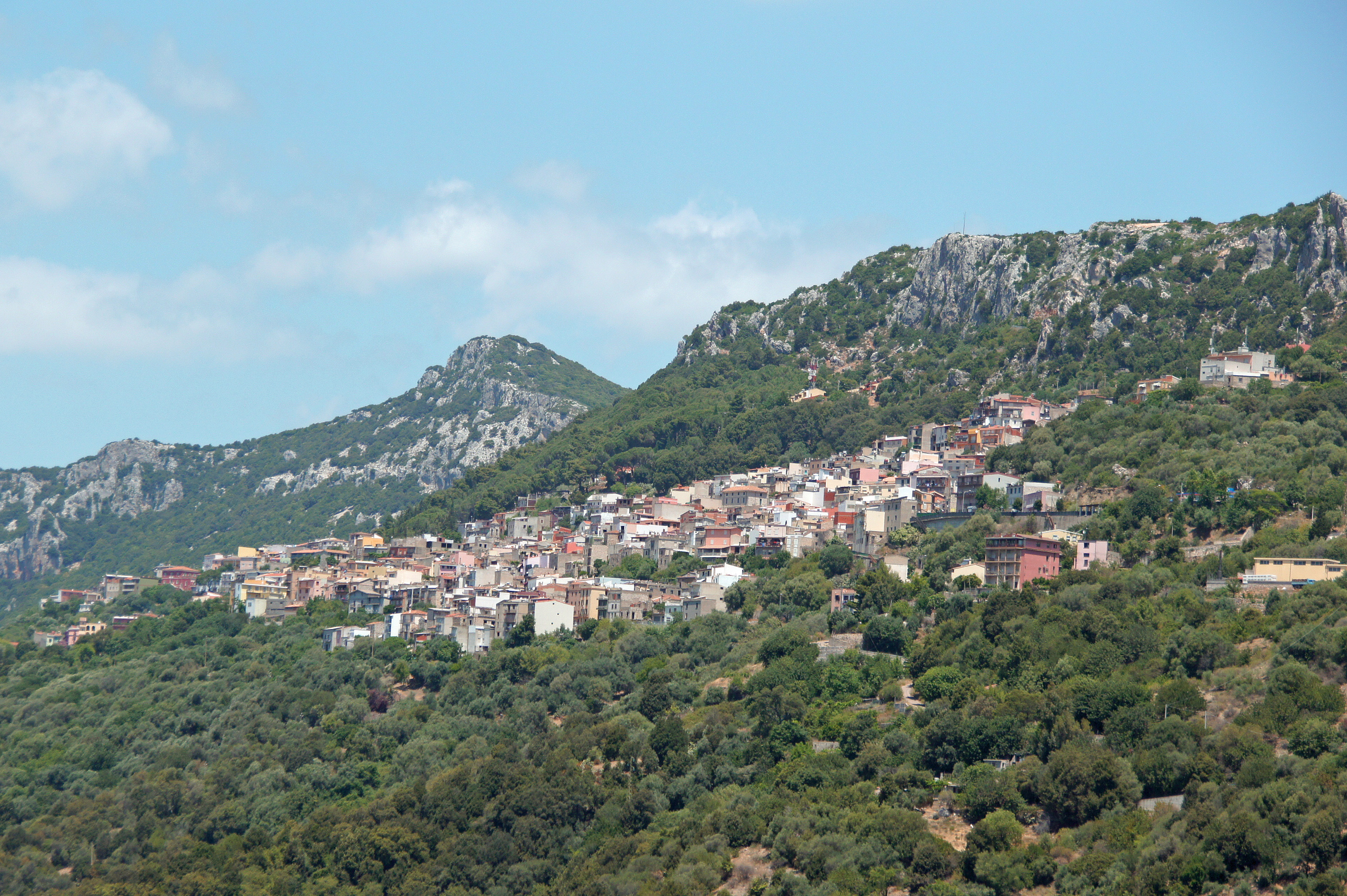
- View of Baunei

- Coat of arms

- Location within Sardinia
- Coordinates: 40°2′N 9°40′E
- Country: Italy
- Region: Sardinia
- Province: Ogliastra
- Frazioni: Santa Maria Navarrese

Government
  - Mayor: Salvatore Corrias

Area
  - Total: 211.90 km^{2} (81.82 sq mi)
- Elevation: 480 m (1,570 ft)

Population (2026)
  - Total: 3,366
  - Density: 15.88/km^{2} (41.14/sq mi)
- Time zone: UTC+1 (CET)
  - Summer (DST): UTC+2 (CEST)
- Postal code: 08040
- Dialing code: 0782
- Patron saint: Saint Nicholas of Bari
- Saint day: 6 December
- Website: Official website

Baunei is a town and comune (municipality) in the Province of Ogliastra in the autonomous island region of Sardinia in Italy. It has 3,366 inhabitants.

It is notable for being the location of the multi-day Selvaggio Blu coastal trek.

== Geography ==
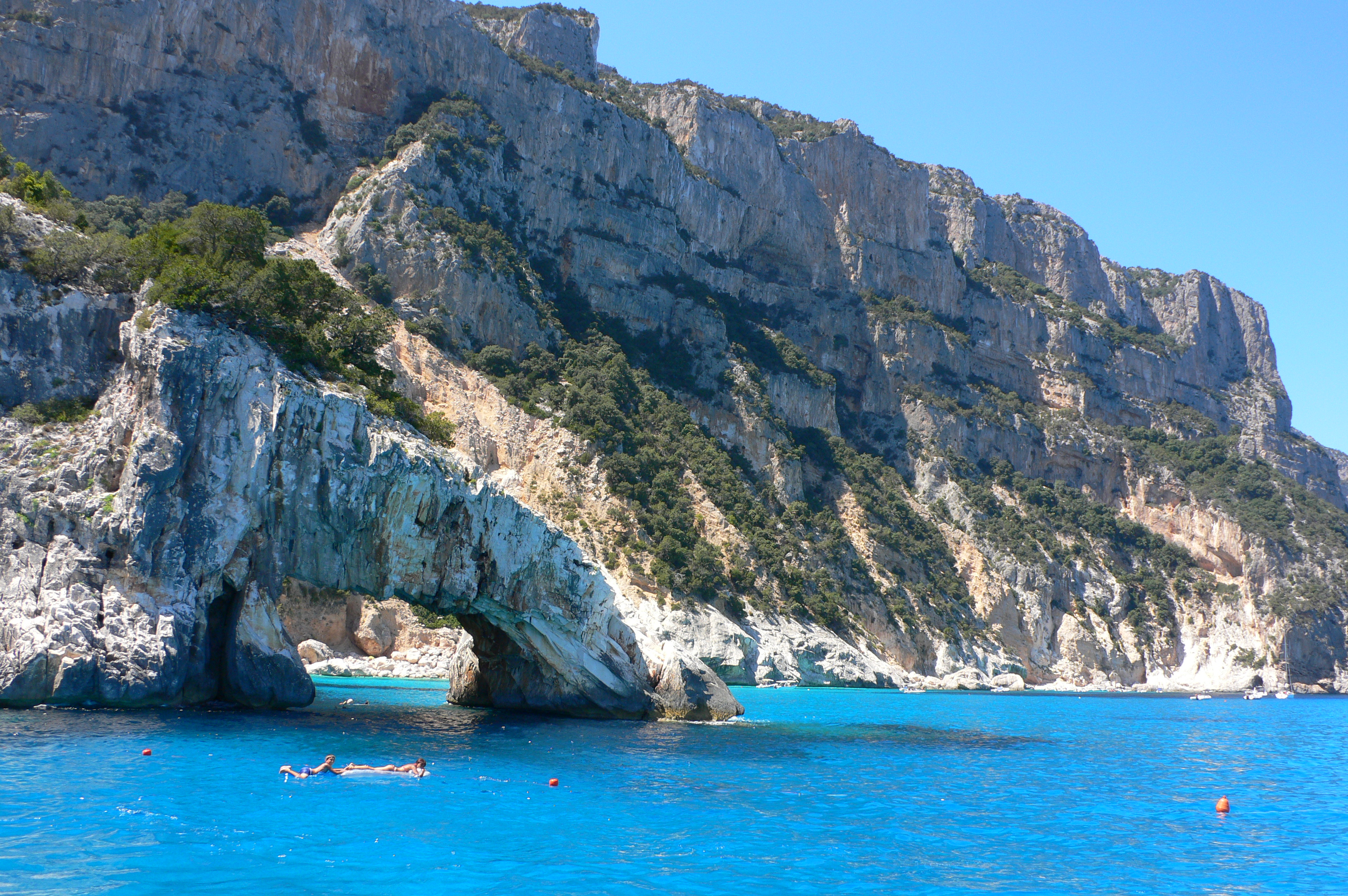
Cala Goloritzé

The municipality of Baunei is located about 100 kilometres (62 mi) northeast of Cagliari and about 11 kilometres (7 mi) north of Tortolì. It contains the frazione (subdivision) Santa Maria Navarrese, a popular seaside resort.

Baunei borders the municipalities of Dorgali, Lotzorai, Talana, Triei, and Urzulei.

== Demographics ==
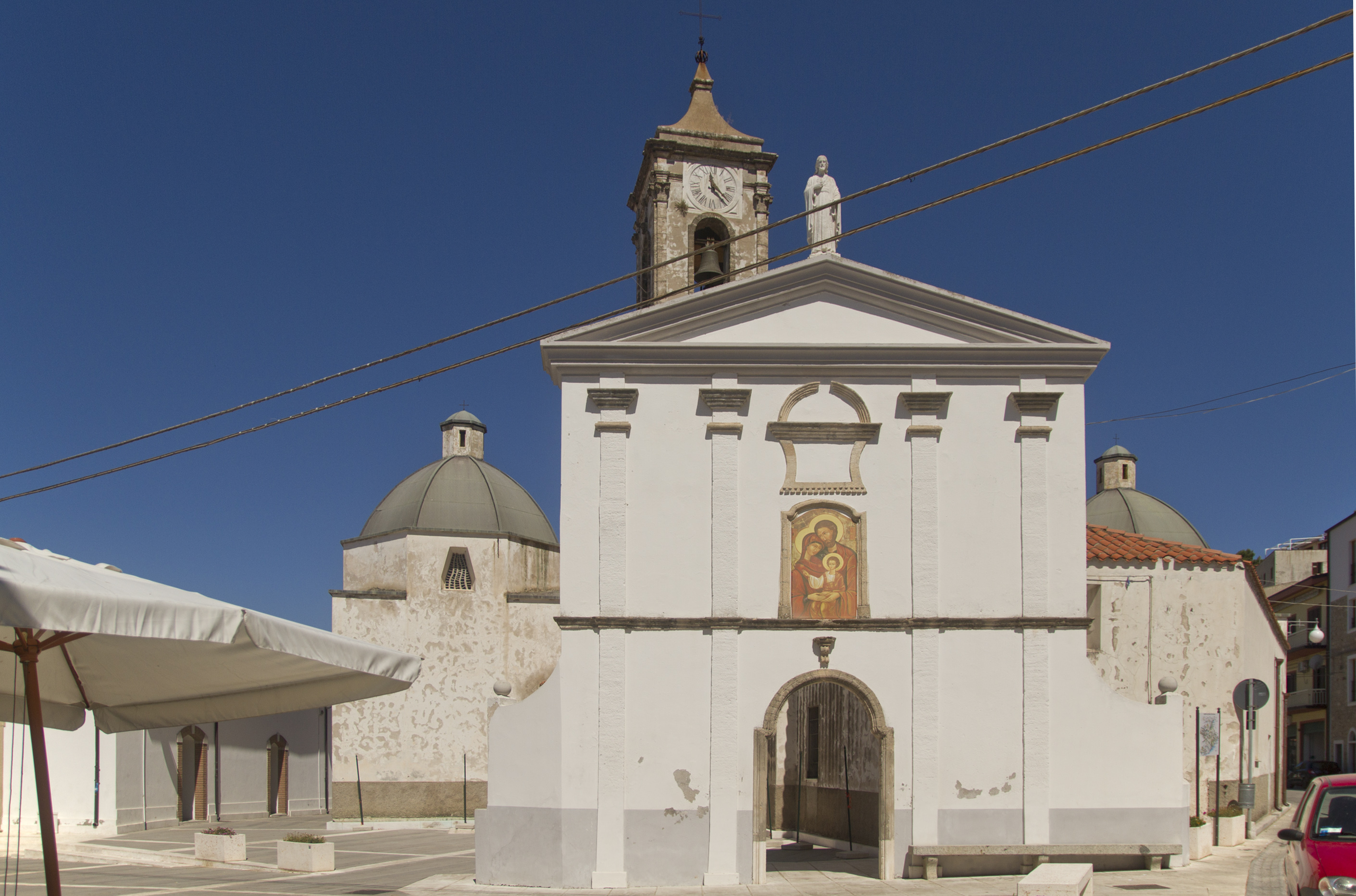
Church of San Nicola

As of 2026, the population is 3,366, of which 49.2% are male, and 50.8% are female. Minors make up 12.9% of the population, and seniors make up 29.4%.

Historical population

Year	Pop.	±%
1861	1,765	—
1871	1,832	+3.8%
1881	1,980	+8.1%
1901	2,397	+21.1%
1911	2,810	+17.2%
1921	2,815	+0.2%
1931	3,045	+8.2%
1936	3,229	+6.0%

Year	Pop.	±%
1951	3,774	+16.9%
1961	4,033	+6.9%
1971	4,061	+0.7%
1981	4,187	+3.1%
1991	4,071	−2.8%
2001	3,886	−4.5%
2011	3,716	−4.4%
2021	3,480	−6.4%

Source: ISTAT

=== Immigration ===
As of 2025, immigrants make up 4.4% of the total population. The 5 largest foreign countries of birth are Germany, Belgium, France, Romania, and Switzerland.
