= Santa Maria Navarrese =

- Frazione
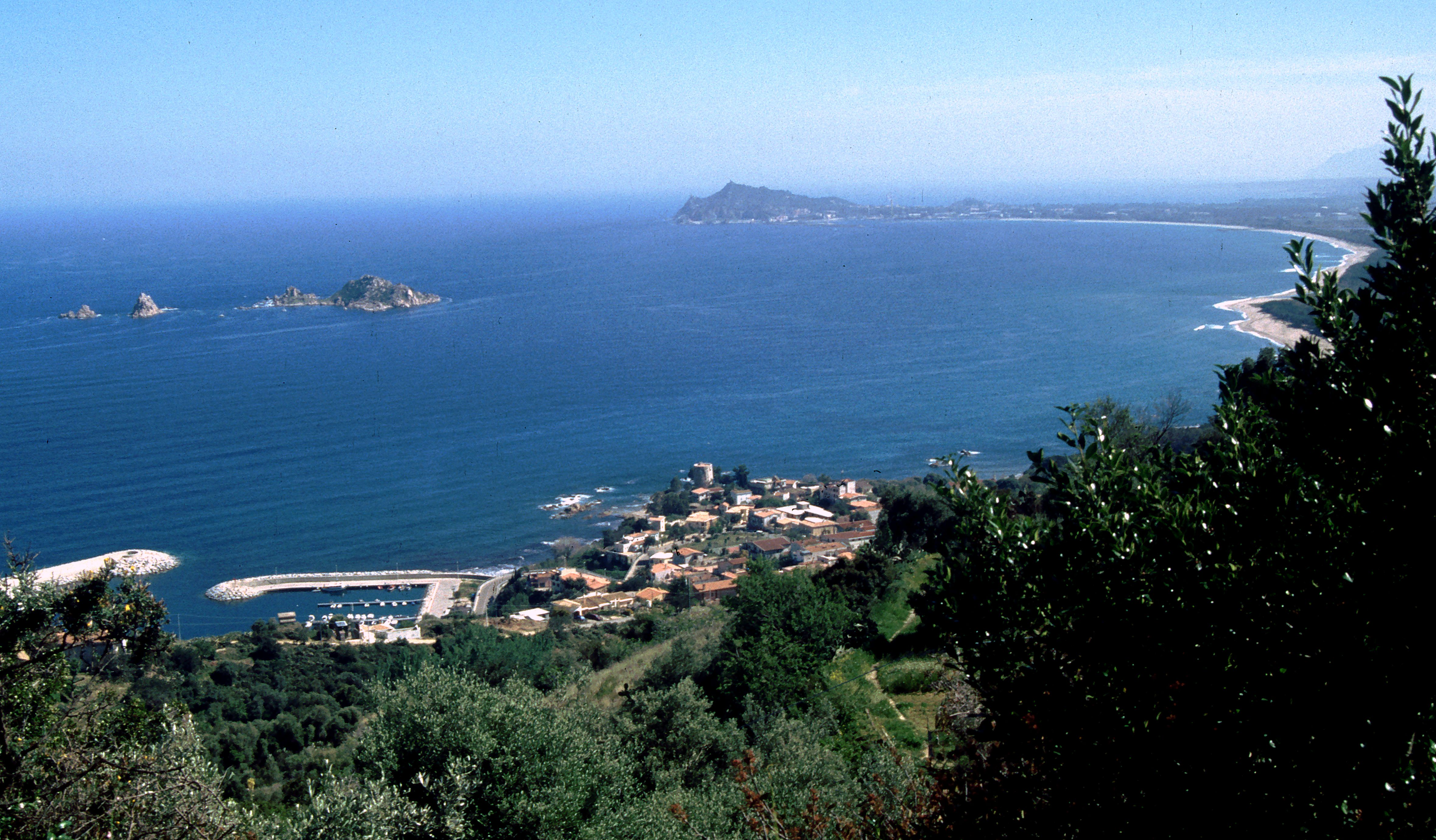

- Location of Santa Maria Navarrese in Italy
- Coordinates: 39°59′20″N 9°41′20″E
- Country: Italy
- Region: Sardinia
- Province: Nuoro
- Comune: Baunei
- Elevation: 9 m (30 ft)

Population (2001)
  - Total: 1,450
- Demonym: Navarrese or Santamariese
- Time zone: UTC+1 (CET)
  - Summer (DST): UTC+2 (CEST)
- Postal code: 08040
- Dialing code: 0782
- Saint day: 15 August

Santa Maria Navarrese is a coastal and tourist town, frazione ('district') of the municipality of Baunei, in the province of Nuoro, Sardinia. It is located about 150 km north of Cagliari and 160 km south of Olbia, in the middle of the Gulf of Arbatax.

== History ==
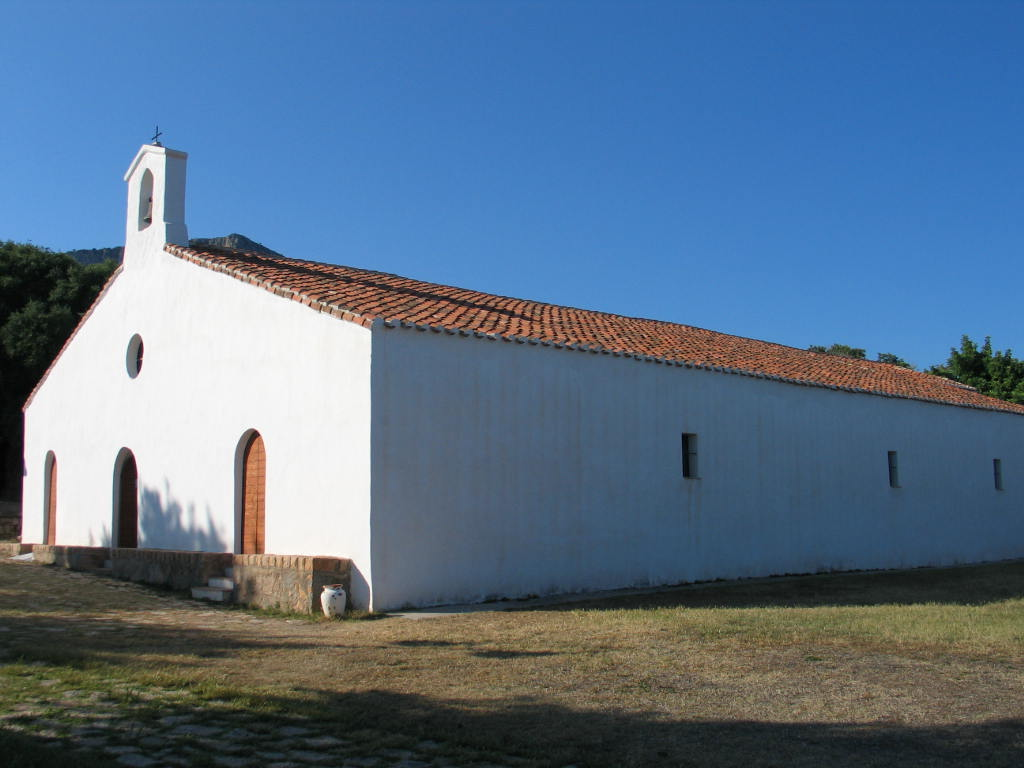
Church of Santa Maria di Navarra

Santa Maria Navarrese, founded in the 1950s by Baunese settlers, has grown around a medieval church dating back to c. 1000, consecrated to Santa Maria Assunta. According to tradition, the church was built on behalf of a princess of Navarra, hence the adjective Navarrese in the village's name. The place is known also for a 17th-century watchtower built on the beach and for the thousand-year-old oleasters in the main square.

== Geography and economy ==
Santa Maria Navarrese has a typical maquis shrubland seascape. Although it is part of the municipality of Baunei, it can be regarded as a separate town in some respects, mainly because Santa Maria Navarrese lies at 9,1 km (12 minutes by car) from Baunei and has a typical seaside landscape and an increasingly tourist economy, while Baunei is located inland and is mostly a mountainous town. Santa Maria Navarrese is also contiguous to the Tancau sul Mare frazione of Lotzorai and is part of a strip of Ogliastra's coastal settlements that stretches southwards to Tortolì and Arbatax. It has a small, well-served tourist port, from which it is possible to reach the famous Sardinian cale: Cala Goloritzé, Cala Luna, Cala Mariolu (also called Ispùligi de Nie), Cala Sisine, Cala Biriala, Spiaggia dei Gabbiani and Grotta del Fico.

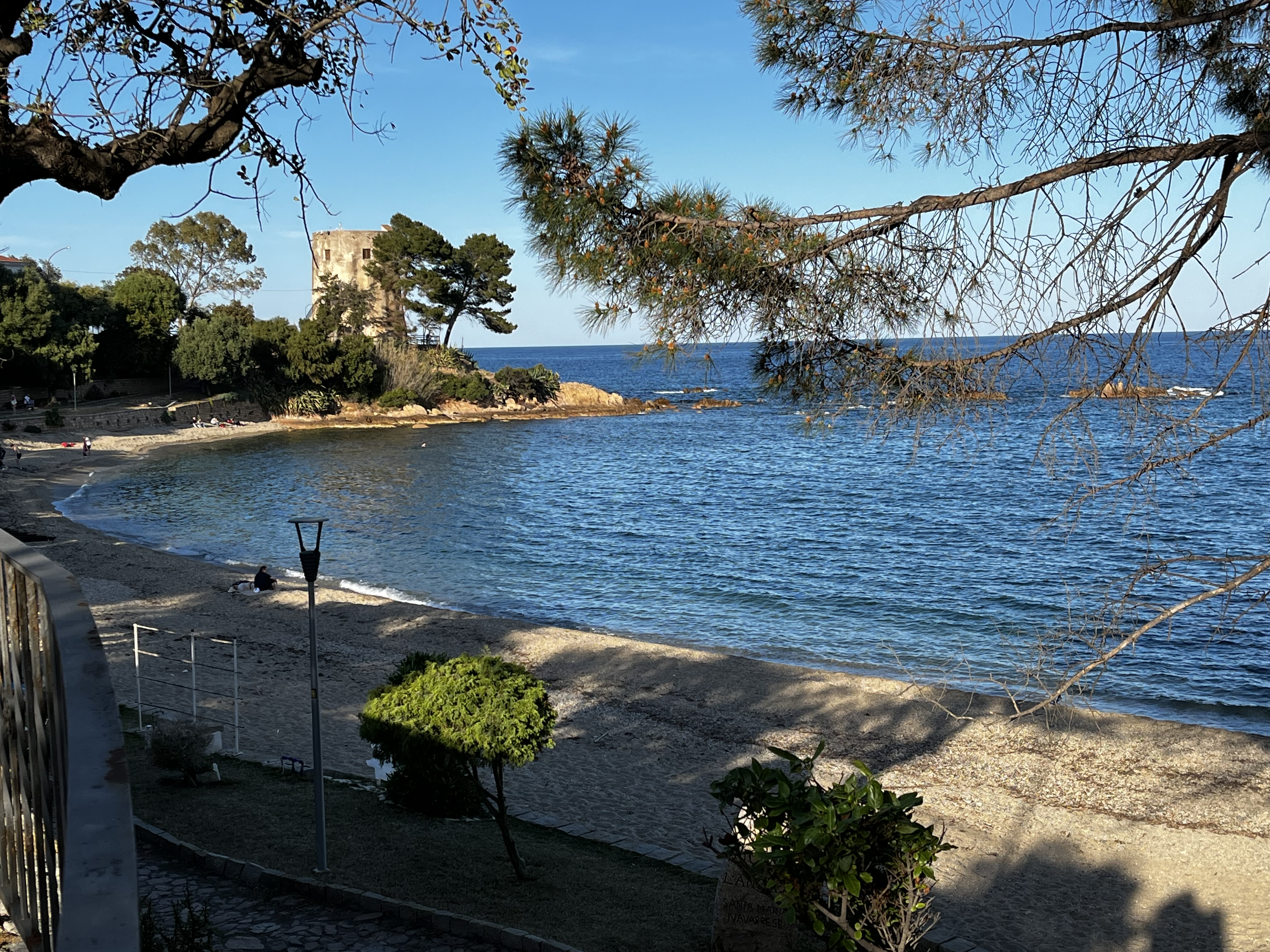
Coastal tower near the beach

The town remains outside most commercial tourist routes and thus still offers a rural landscape that provides an insight in day-to-day Sardinian life which can be ideal for nature trail tourism.

One trekking route that is focused on nature that starts from this city is Selvaggio Blu.
