= Maurizio Zanolla =

Italian rock climber

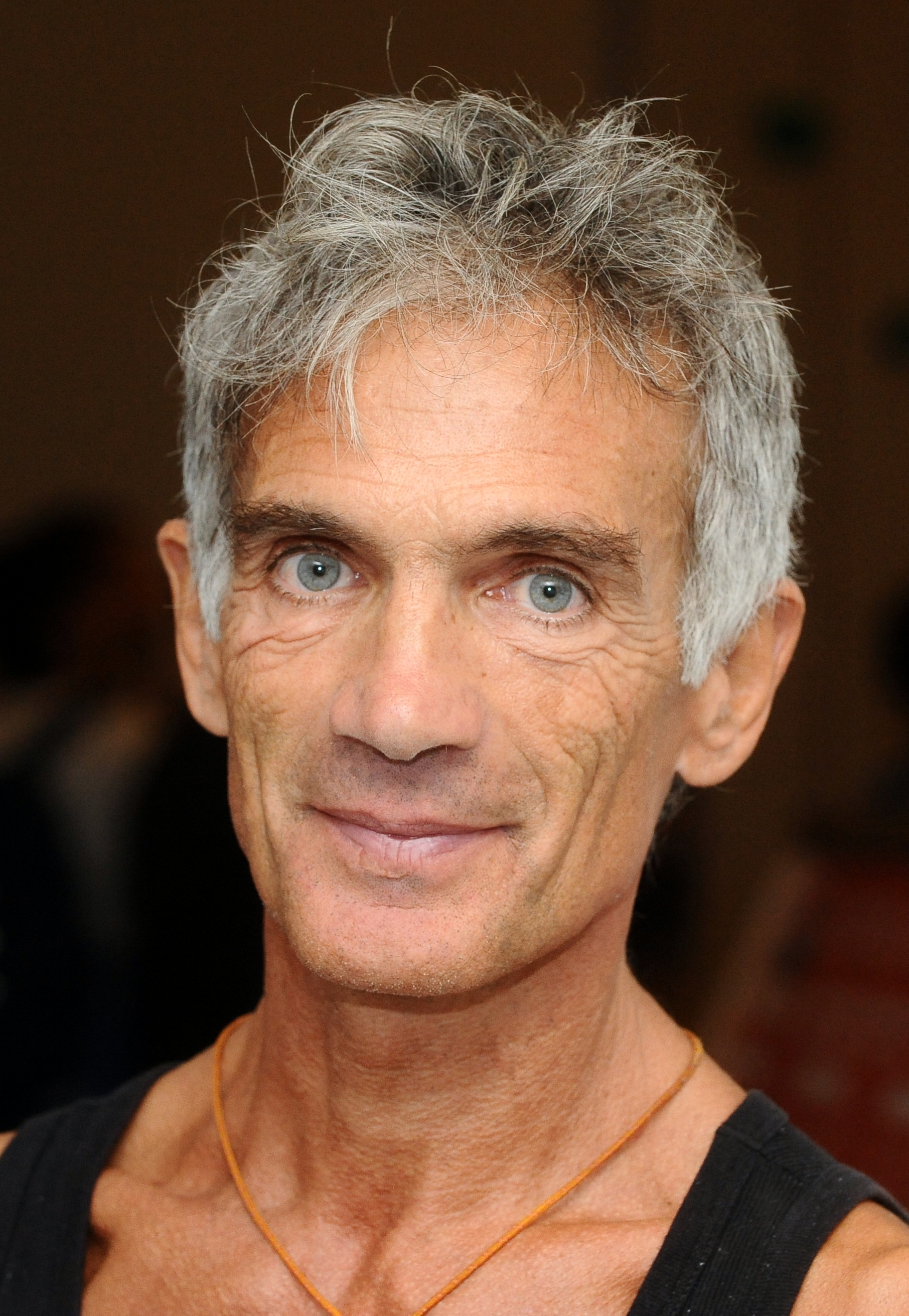
- Manolo in 2013

Personal information
- Nickname: Manolo
- Born: 16 February 1958 (age 68)
- Occupations: Mountain guide, rock climber
- Website: www.lasportiva.com/en/blog/ambassadors/manolo

Climbing career
- Type of climber: Sport climbing; Free solo climbing; Alpine climbing
- Highest grade: Redpoint: 9a+ (5.15a); Onsight/Flash: 8b+ (5.14a)
- First ascents: Il mattino dei maghi (7c+, 1981); Ultimo movimento (8b, 1986); Il Maratoneta (8b+, 1987); Malvasia (8b+, 1988); The Dream (8c, 1991)
- Known for: First Italian 8b route
- Updated on 7 April 2023

Maurizio "Manolo" Zanolla (born in Feltre, 16 February 1958) is an Italian rock climber and mountaineer, and a pioneer of sport climbing in Italy during the 1980s and 1990s.

== Climbing career ==
Zanolla came to international attention with his free solos in the Dolomites. In 1986, he became one of the first Italians to climb a route of grade 8b (5.13d) with l'Ultimo Movimento in Totoga in the Pale di San Martino. In 1992, he became one of the first Italians to free solo a grade 8a (5.13b) route, with Masala Dosa on the wall of "San Silvestro" in 1992. In 1981, with Alessandro Gogna, he climbed the Aguglia of Goloritzè in Sardinia, initiating the original development of the Selvaggio Blu trekking route.

== Notable ascents ==
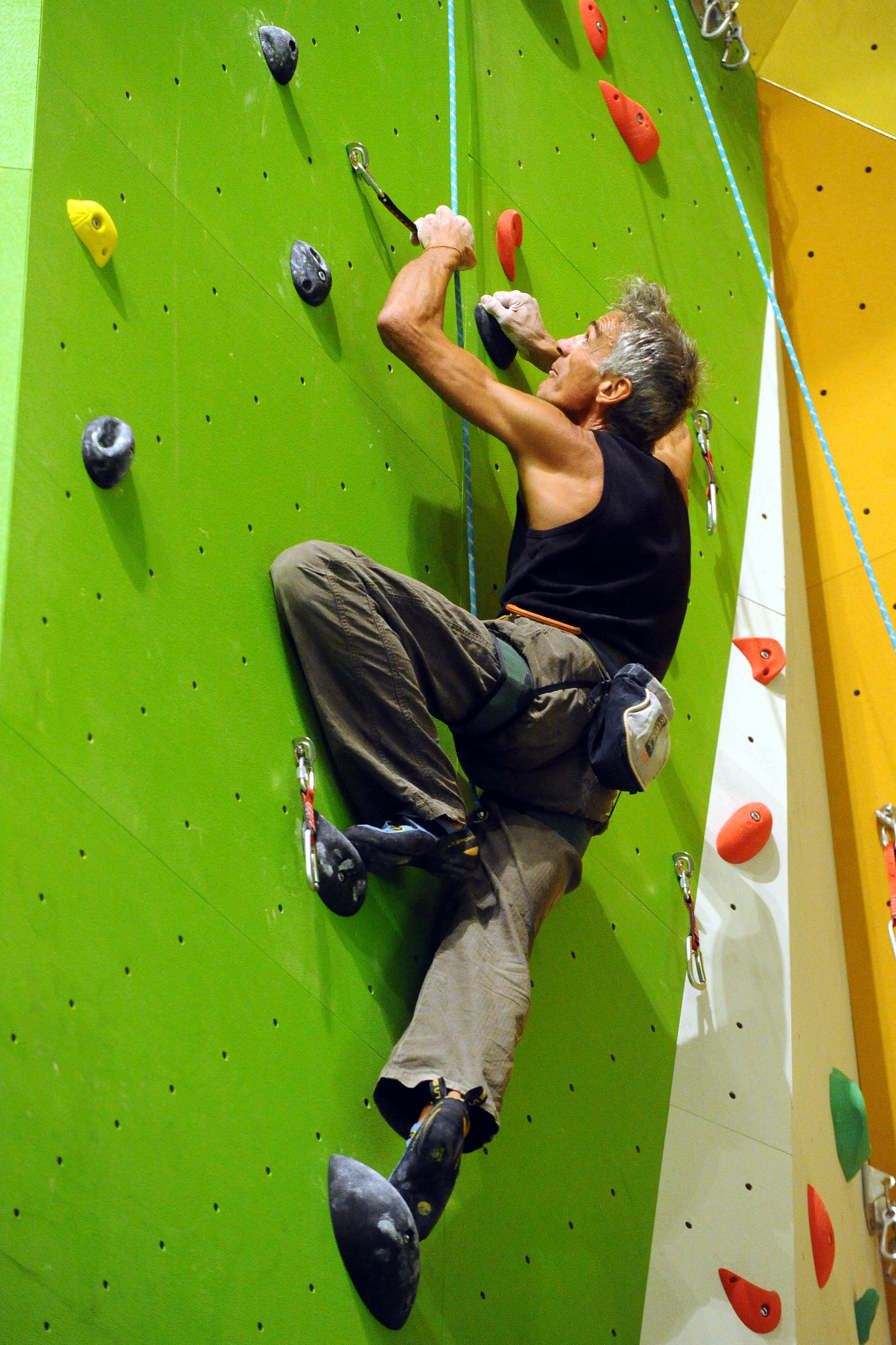
Zanolla indoor climbing in Trento, in 2013

=== Redpoint ===
- 9a+ (5.15a):
  - Bimbaluna – Saint-Loup (SUI) – 20 January 2008. Repeat of Fred Nicole's 2004 route; Zanolla was almost 50 at the time and the hardest routes in the world were only at 9a+/b.
- 9a (5.14d):
  - Eternit – Vette Feltrine/Baule (ITA) – 24 August 2009. First ascent; continuation of O ce l'hai...
  - Bain de Sang – Saint-Loup (SUI) – 2006. Repeat of Fred Nicole's 1993 route.
- 8c+ (5.14c):
  - Roby Present – Val Noana (ITA) – 24 March 2012. First ascent; dedicated to Roberto Bassi.
- 8c (5.14b):
  - Eroi Fragili – Val Noana (ITA) – 5 March 2011. First ascent.
  - Stramonio – Val Noana (ITA) – 10 October 2010. First ascent.
  - Thin ice – Terlago (ITA) – 25 April 2009. Route freed by Nico Favresse, 2007
  - El sior Favonio – Fonzaso (ITA) – 2006. First ascent.
  - Diabloluna – Fonzaso (ITA) – 2006
  - L'Arte di Salire in Alto – Celva (ITA) – 2002. Rare repeat of Rolando Larcher's first-ever Italian 8c route from 1992.
  - The Dream – Val Noana (ITA) – October 1991. First ascent.
- 8b+ (5.14a):
  - Appigli Ridicoli – Vette Feltrine/Baule (ITA) – 1990. First ascent; Manulo reclimbed it in 2001 without using his original drilled one-finger pocket hold, and regraded it to over 8c (now considered 9a).
  - Malvasia – Dvigrad (CRO) – 1988. First ascent; now considered 8c+ after some of the holds broke.
  - Il Maratoneta – Paklenica (CRO) – 1987. First ascent, and only two years after the first-ever 8b+.
- 8b (5.13d):
  - O ce l'hai… o ne hai bisogno – Vette Feltrine/Baule (ITA) – 1990
  - Ultimo Movimento – Totoga (ITA) – 1986. First ascent and first-ever 8b (5.13d) in Italy.
- 8a+ (5.13c):
  - Terminator – Totoga (ITA) – 1985. First ascent and first-ever 8a+ (5.13c) in Italy.
- 7c+ (5.13a):
  - Il Mattino dei Maghi – Totoga (ITA) – 1981. First ascent, and possibly one of the earliest 7c+ routes.

=== Onsight ===
- Rock and Blues 8b+ (5.14a), Kalymnos (GRE) – 19 June 2009. Zanolla was 51 at the time.
- La Pista 8a (5.13b), Arco – 1989.
- La Fissure Serge (7c+), Buoux – 1988.

=== Free solo ===
- Masala Dosa 8a (5.13b) in Totoga, in San Silvestro cliff – 1992.
- La Gatta 7c (5.12d), Mount Totoga – 1990.

== Bibliography ==
- Zanolla, Maurizio "Manolo" (April 2018). Eravamo immortali ("We were immortal"). Fabbri. ISBN 978-8891517579.
- Zak, Heinz (November 1996). Rock Stars: World's Best Free Climbers. Cordee. ISBN 978-3763370443.

== See also ==
- List of grade milestones in rock climbing
