= Alessandro Gogna =

Italian mountaineer

Personal information
- Nationality: (Italy) Italian
- Born: 29 July 1946 (age 80) Genoa, Italy
- Website: http://www.alessandrogogna.com

Climbing career
- Major ascents: Matterhorn, Grandes Jorasses, Marmolada di Rocca

Alessandro Gogna (born 29 July 1946) is a mountaineer, adventurer and mountain guide from Italy.

== Biography ==
Born in Genoa, Italy, he is one of the key figures of Italian mountaineering, both as an active climber and as one of the foremost writers about the mountain world. He has lived and described the transition from classic mountaineering to modern climbing.

The first ascents were on the mountains of his native Liguria. His interest moved to the walls of the Dolomites and he has since climbed in all possible environments, from sea level to the high camps of K2. He count over 500 new climbs in Italy.

He still is one of the international guarantors of Mountain Wilderness having been among the founders.

In 1981, Alessandro Gogna, with Maurizio Zanolla, climbed the Aguglia of Goloritzè in Sardinia, initiating the original development of the Selvaggio Blua trekking route.

== Notable ascents ==
- 1967: Scarason (Alpi Liguri), NE wall, first ascent
- 1968: Pizzo Badile, NE wall, route Cassin, first winter ascent
- 1968: Grandes Jorasses, N wall, route Cassin, first solo ascent
- 1969: Grand Capucin, SE wall, Diretta dei Ragni, first winter ascent
- 1969: Monte Rosa, Macugnaga E wall, via dei Francesi, first solo ascent
- 1969: Matterhorn, Naso di Z’Mutt first ascent
- 1970: Grivola, NE wall, via Cretier, first winter ascent
- 1970: IIa Pala di S. Lucano, SW wall, first ascent
- 1970: Marmolada, S wall, first ascent direct route
- 1971: Pilier d'Angle, full Peutérey ridge, first winter ascent
- 1971: Cima di Terranova Monte Civetta, NW wall, first ascent direct route
- 1972: IIIa Pala di San Lucano, W wall, first ascent
- 1972: Brenta Alta, NE ridge, first ascent
- 1972: Grandes Jorasses, S wall, first ascent
- 1972: Aiguille de Leschaux, NE wall, first ascent direct route
- 1974: IIa Pala di San Lucano, E wall, first ascent
- 1974: IVa Pala di San Lucano, S wall, first ascent
- 1974: Campanile dei Zoldani (Moiazza), W wall, first ascent direct route
- 1974: Palazza (Monti del Sole), SW wall, first ascent
- 1981: Guglia di Goloritzé, first ascent ever
- 1984: Liss dal Pesgunfi (Val Màsino), E wall, first ascent
- 2005: Cima di Pino Sud (Col Nudo), E wall, first ascent

== Expeditions ==
- 1973: Annapurna, attempt on the NW ridge
- 1975: Lhotse, S wall, attempt
- 1978: El Capitan (California), Salathé route, first Italian climb
- 1979: K2, Abruzzi spur

== Other activities ==
- Speaker (400 talks in Italy and worldwide, starting 1968 until today)
- Writer, about 200 articles on magazines, newspaper, web
- Trekking tour leader in Asia and Africa, dal 1972 al 1978
- creator and coordinator of outstanding initiatives, such as: Clean Marmolada, Free K2, Save the Glaciers, Levissima for Everest, Club Alpino Italiano cleanup of Baltoro Glacier, ecc.

== Selected bibliography ==
Alessandro Gogna has written over 40 books, in many languages, and co-authored many more.

- Gogna, A., Grandes Jorasses Sperone Walker (Tamari, Nordpress, 1999)
- Gogna, A., Un alpinismo di ricerca (Dall’Oglio, 1975)
- Gogna, A. Reinhold Messner, K2 (De Agostini, 1980)
- Gogna, A., La parete (Zanichelli, 1981)
- Gogna, A., Cento nuovi mattini (Zanichelli, 1981)
- Gogna, A., Mezzogiorno di pietra (Zanichelli, 1982)
- Gogna, A., Rock story (Edizioni Melograno, 1983)
- Gogna, A., Cento pareti di ghiaccio nelle Alpi (Zanichelli, 1984)
- Gogna, A., A piedi in Valtellina (De Agostini, 1984)
- Gogna, A., Dal Pizzo Badile al Bernina (Zanichelli, 1986)
- Gogna, A., Sentieri verticali (Zanichelli, 1987)
- Gogna, A., Mesolcina - Spluga (CAI - TCI, 1999)
- Gogna, A., K2. Uomini. Esplorazioni. Imprese
- Gogna, A., I Grandi Spazi delle Alpi (8 volumes)
- Gogna, A., Le Montagne più belle (11 volumes), La Stampa - Priuli&Verlucca, 2006 e 2008
- Gogna, A., La verità obliqua di Severino Casara (with Italo Zandonella, Priuli&Verlucca, 2009)
- Gogna, A., Insieme in vetta, (with Raggio, A. Mondadori 2013)

== See also ==
- List of climbers
