= Conservatoria delle Coste =

Sardinian public agency

The Conservatoria delle Coste (Coastal conservation agency) (official name: Conservatoria delle Coste della Sardegna in Italian, Conservatoria de sas Costeras de sa Sardigna in Sardinian) is a Sardinian public agency created by the Regional Law N°2 of 29 May 2007, to ensure the protection of outstanding natural areas on the Sardinian coast.

== Creation ==
The creation of the Conservatoria delle Coste was inspired by the British National Trust, and foremost by the French Conservatoire du littoral.

The Conservatoria was created by the Autonomous Region of Sardinia as an independent agency. Its organs are the Scientific Committee, the Executive Director and the Board of Auditors. As of January 2026 the Executive Director is Dr. Maria Elena Dessì. The headquarters of the Regional Agency for Coastal Conservation of Sardinia is in the City of Cagliari.

== Mission ==
Sardinian coasts are composed of cliffs, islands and sand dunes, which are the result of geology, weather conditions and exposure to the ever-pounding sea. The agency manages some of the most beautiful locations belonging to the Sardinian historical and cultural heritage: lighthouses, harbours, towers and past archaeological sites.

The Conservatoria acquires the most fragile and delicate territories by donations, by pre-emption in or, from time to time, by direct purchase. After ensuring all the restoration work, the Conservatoria can manage the areas itself or may entrust the management to local authorities or other local groups or organisations. The Conservatoria determines how the sites should be managed and what activities (such as agricultural or touristic activities) are compatible with its goals. The main objective of the Agenzia Conservatoria delle Coste is to ensure sustainable development of coastal areas through an integrated management system and in particular the implementation of the Integrated Coastal Zone Management in Sardinia coastal areas under the institutional framework of the International Protocol and the European Union recommendations on coastal management.

The agency works in collaboration with the Priority Actions Programme and Regional Activity Centre of the Mediterranean Action Plan of the United Nations Environment Programme (UNEP) to better manage Sardinian coastal zones, improving an integrated approach of the decision processes, and taking into account geographical, political, environmental, social, cultural, historical and economical aspects. This process, as well as the emerging coastal environmental challenges are being dealt with in coordination with other Mediterranean countries.

The Conservatoria delle Coste carries out four specific priorities:

=== Priority 1: Conservation and local development ===
- conservation and valorisation of Sardinian historical coastal heritage
- scientific applied research on coastal and marine ecosystems
- implementation of sustainable local development strategies in partnership with coastal municipalities
- support and promotion of sustainable tourism, fishing and agriculture activities

=== Priority 2: Integrated Coastal Zone Management ===
- coordination and planning actions
- strategies for adaptation to climate change
- actions for strengthening coastal areas natural resilience
- coastal erosion risk mitigation strategies and monitoring

=== Priority 3: Awareness Raising and Environmental Education ===
- communication and public awareness
- environmental education for primary and high schools
- activities for children, like street theatre and environmental games
- photo and video contests organized through cooperation with local authorities

=== Priority 4: International Cooperation ===
- international cooperation activities within the framework of the coastal integrated management, climate change and sustainable tourism

== Images ==
Images of the Sardinian coast.

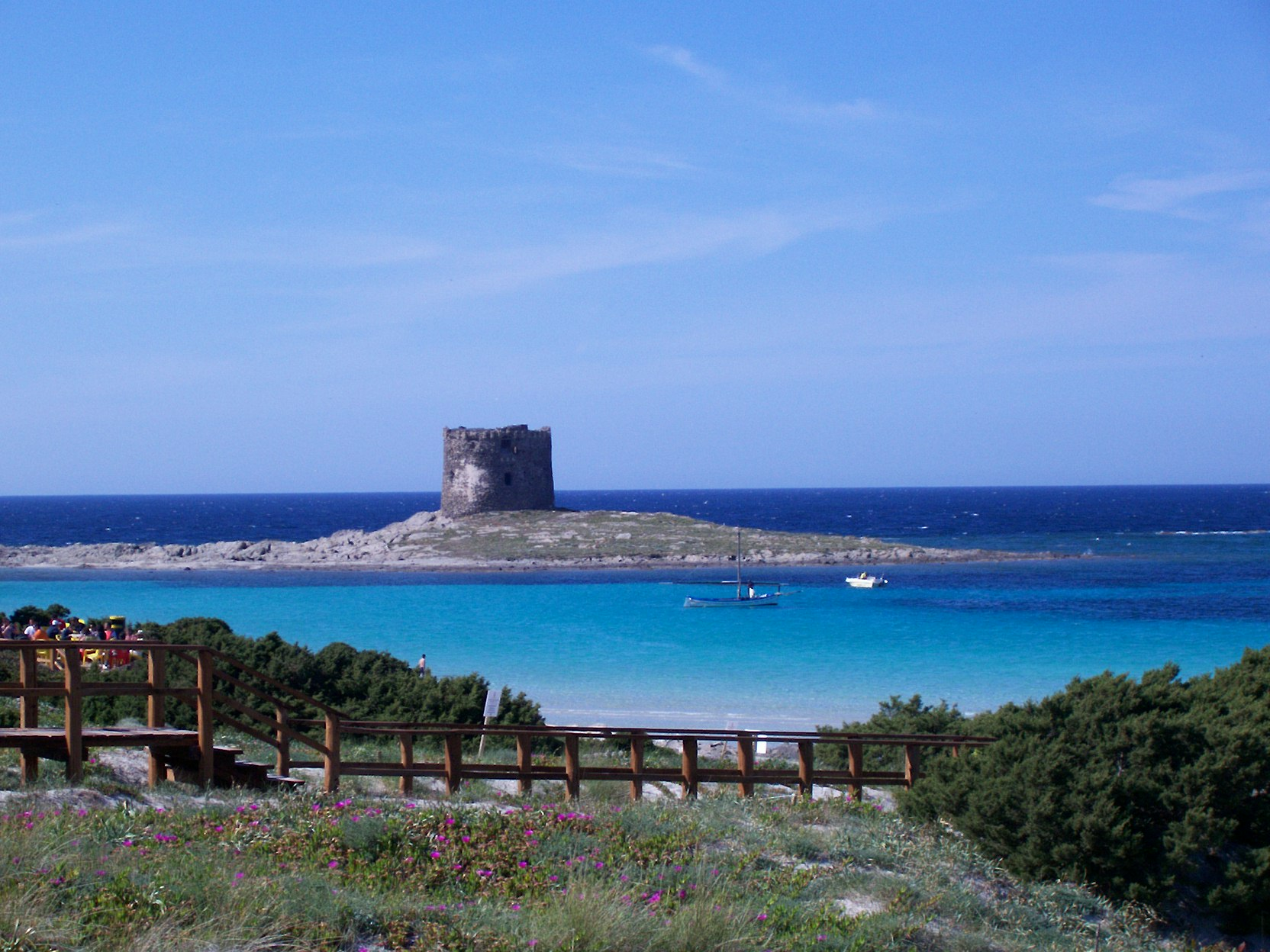
Tower of La Pelosa (Stintino)

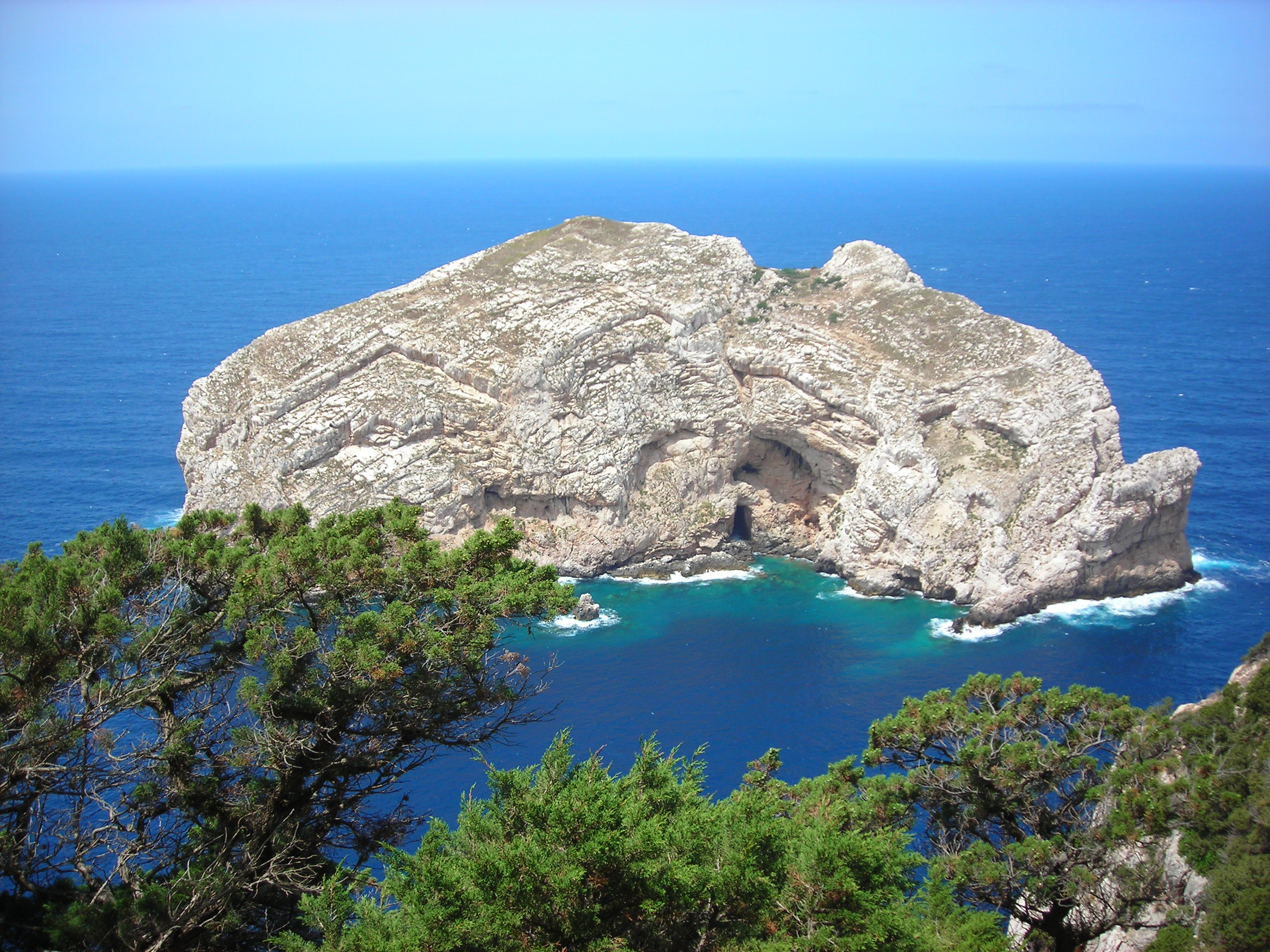
Isola Foradada (Alghero)

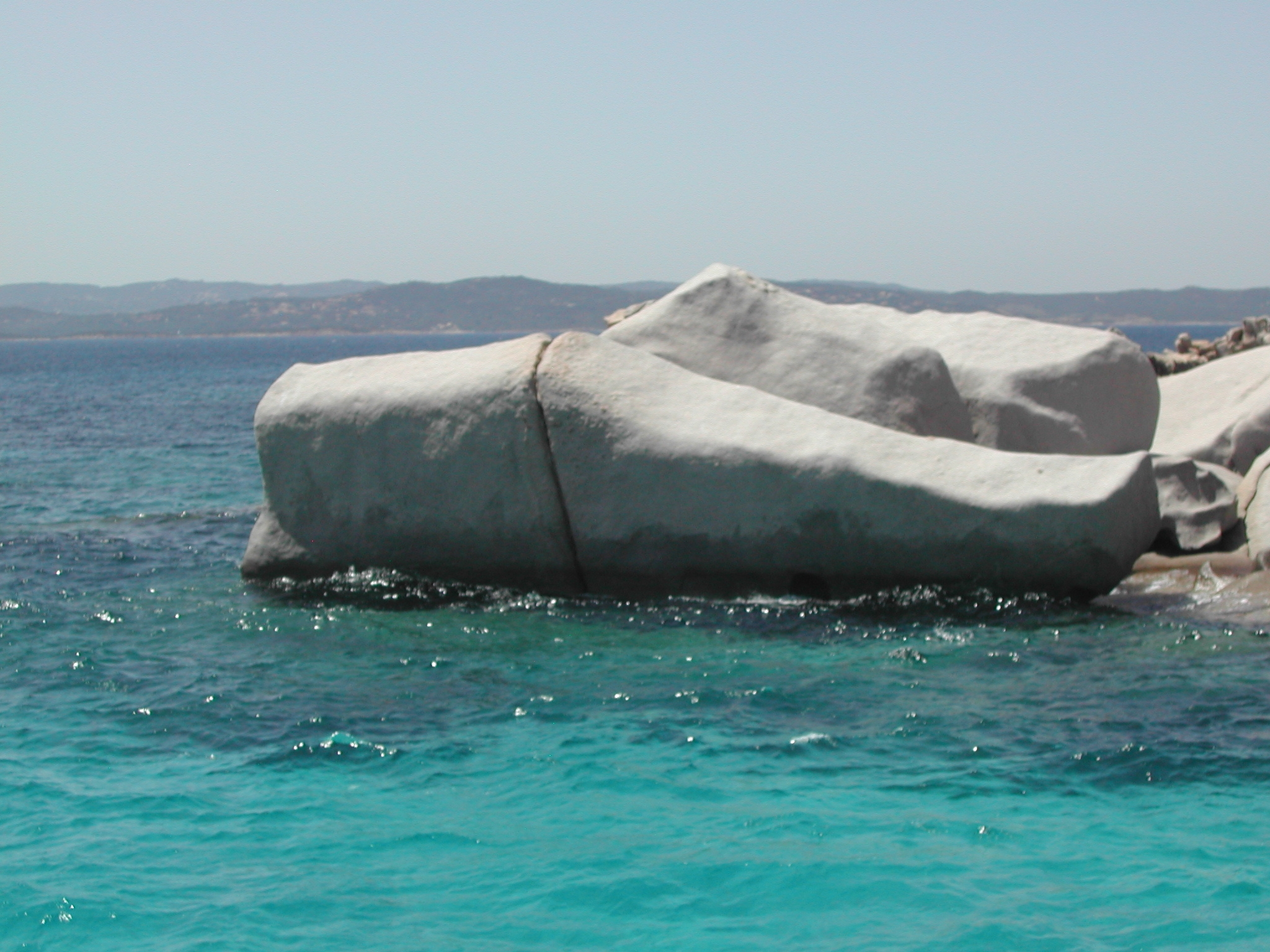
Spargi Island
(La Maddalena)

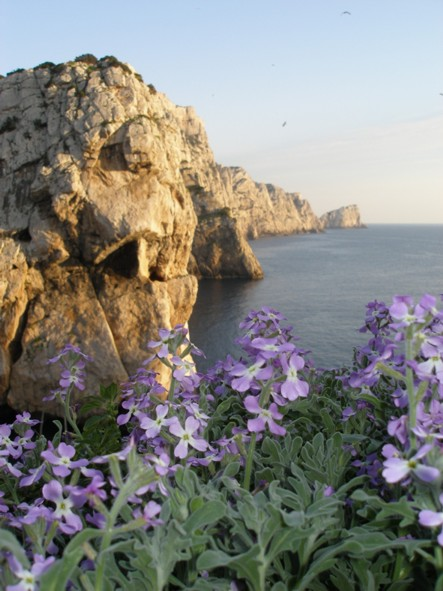
Isola Piana ("Flat Island") (Alghero)

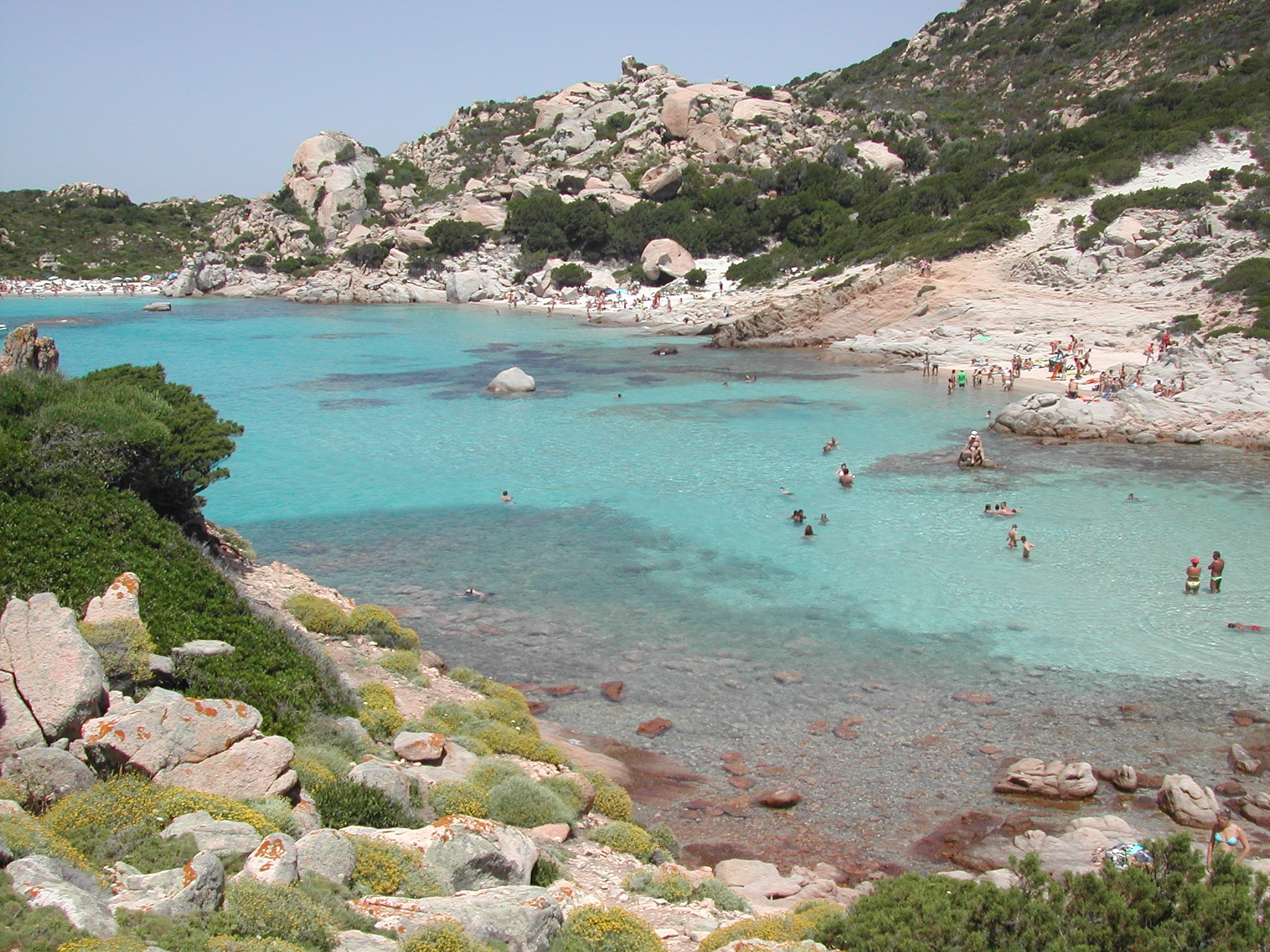
Spargi Island
(La Maddalena)

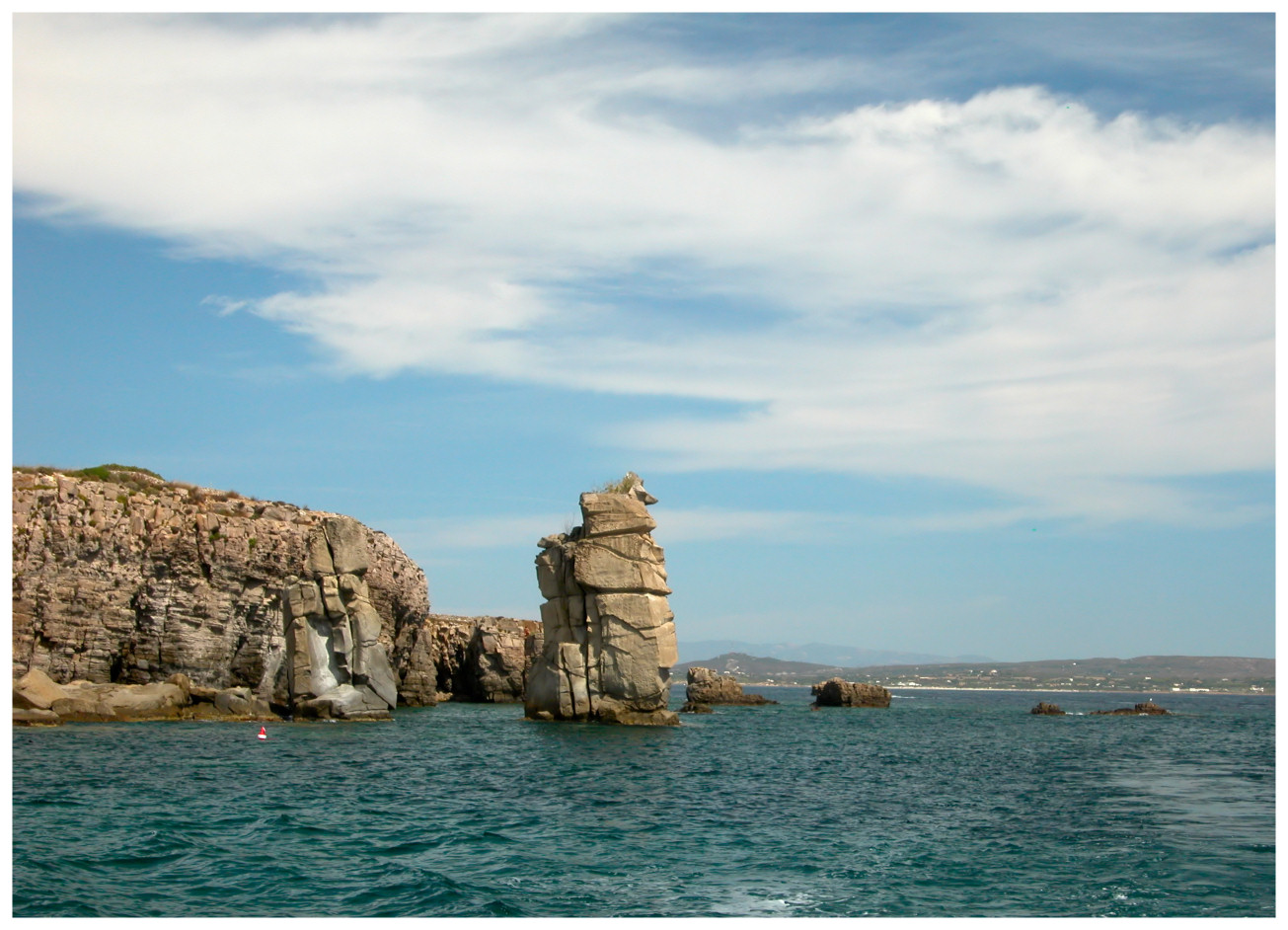
Columns of Carloforte, San Pietro Island, (Carloforte)

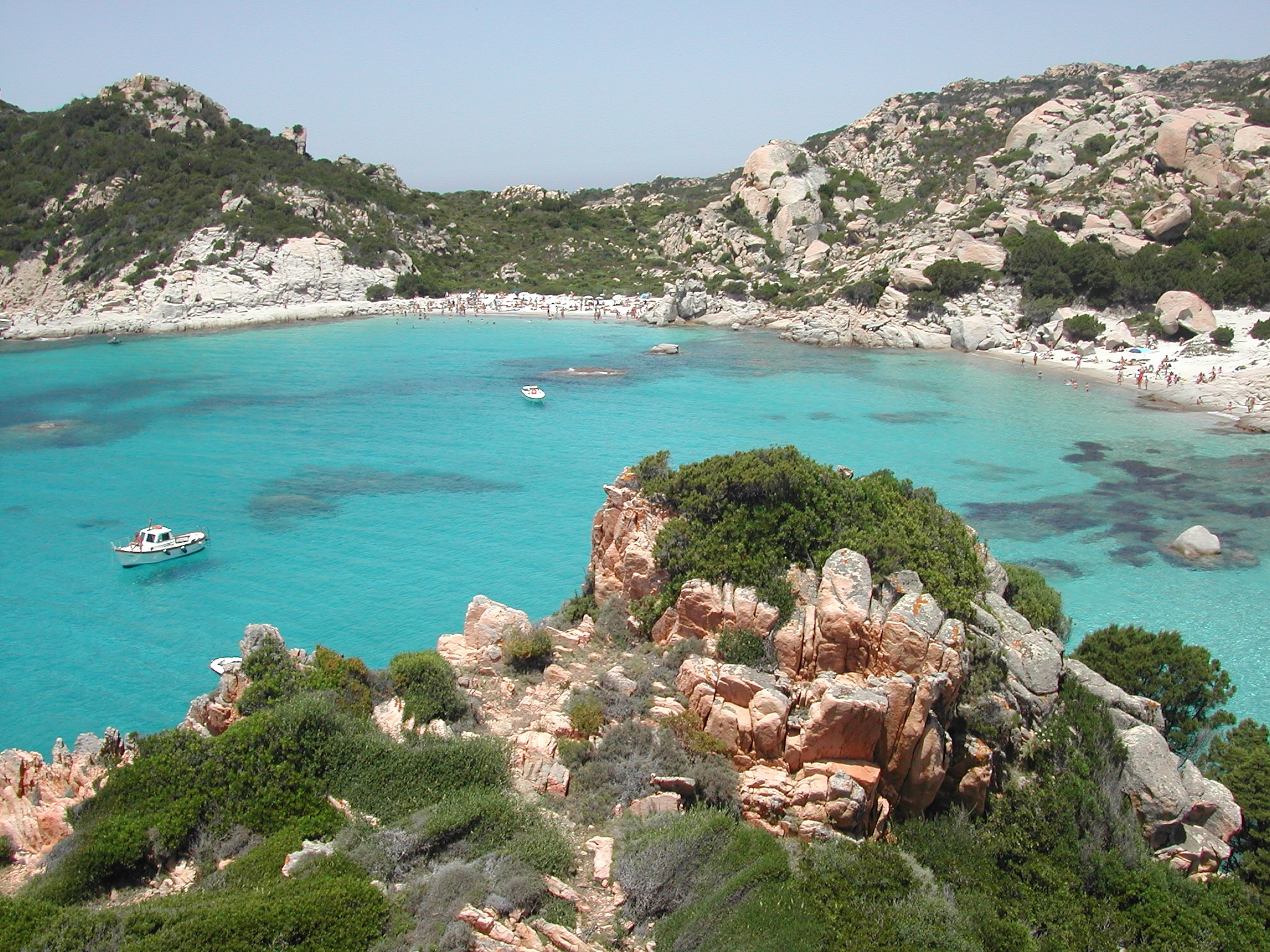
Spargi Island
(La Maddalena)

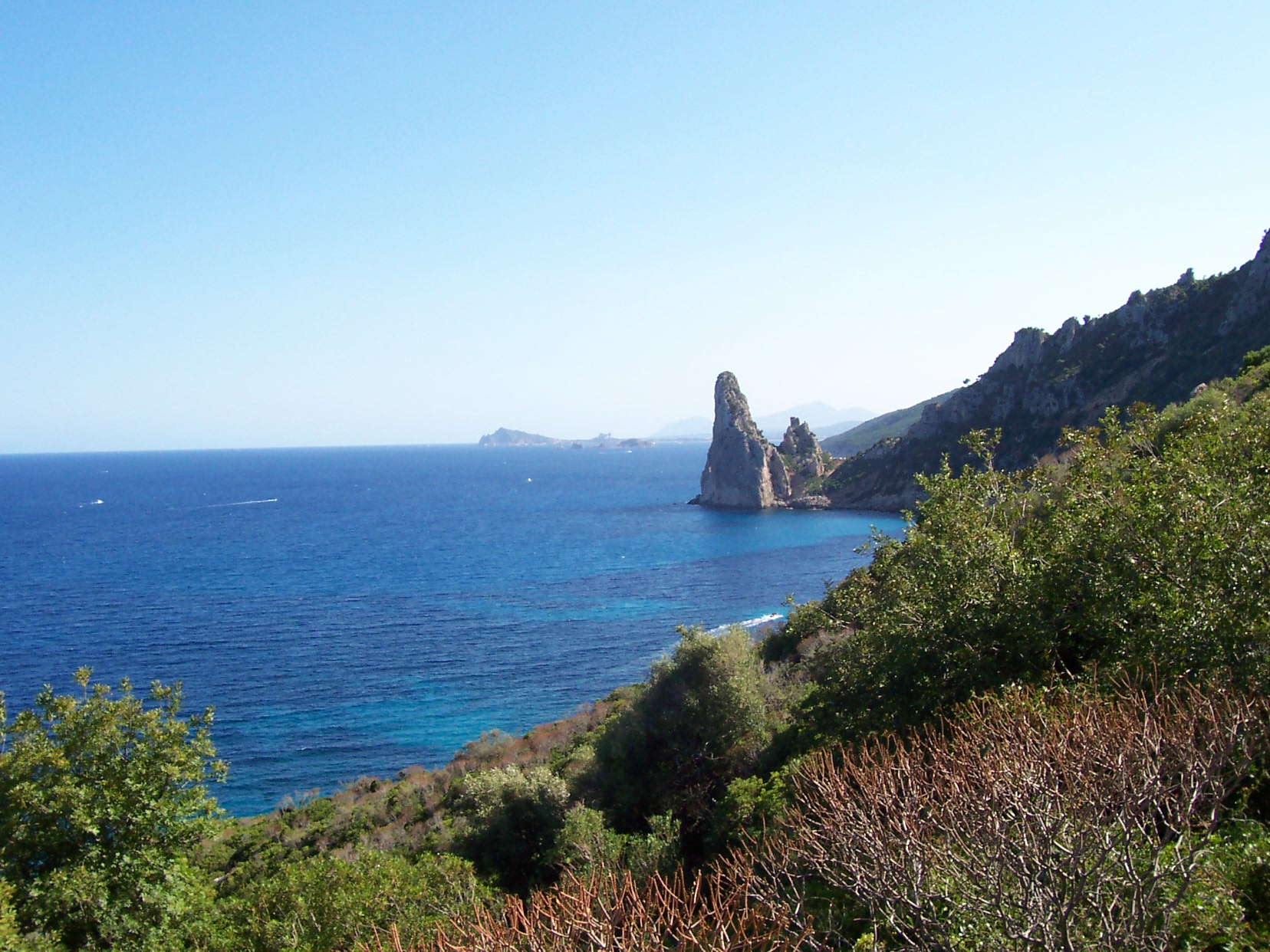
Pedra Longa (Baunei)

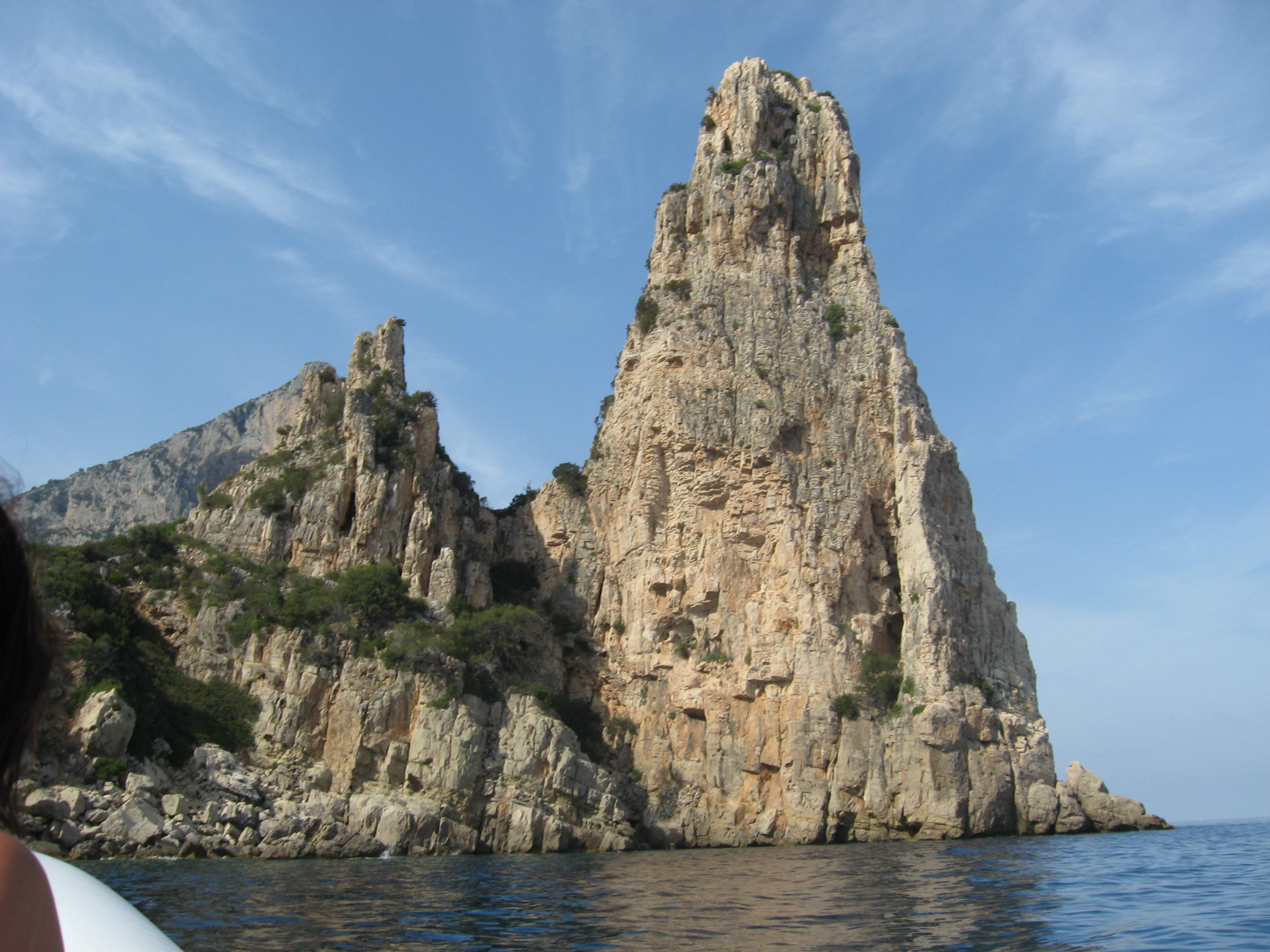
Pedra Longa (Baunei)

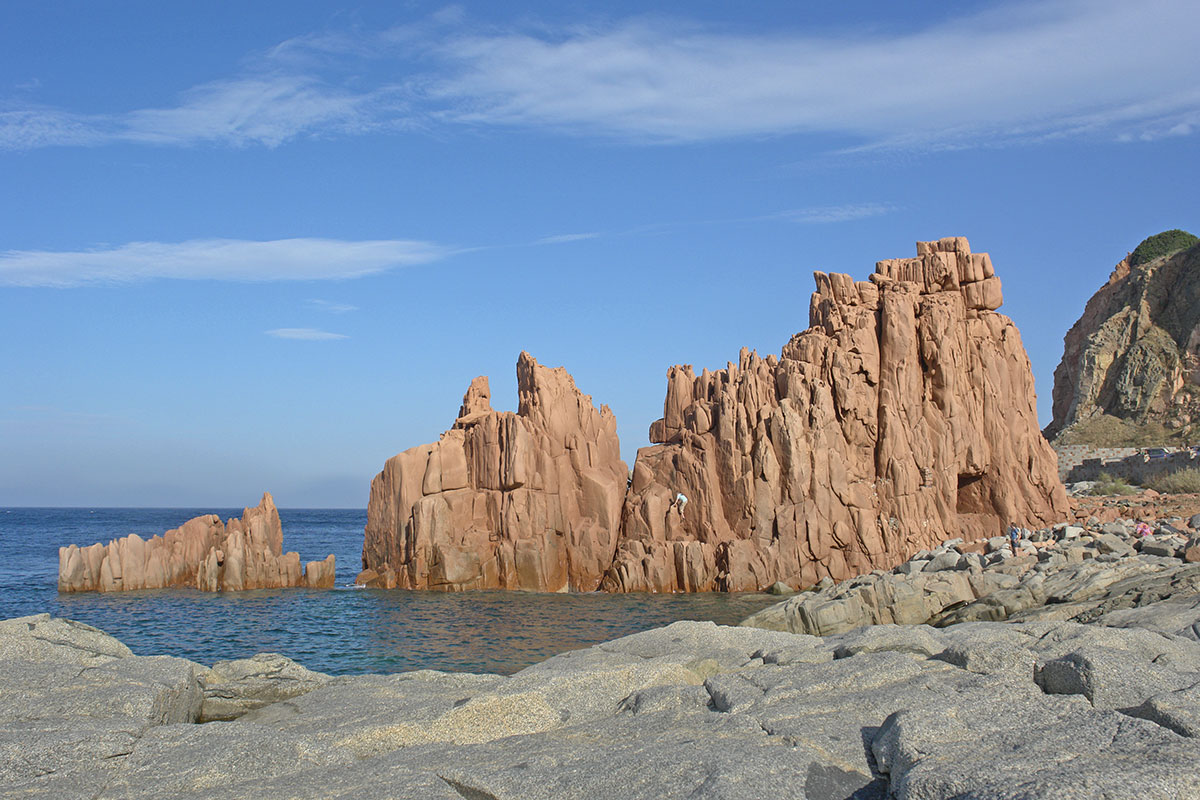
Arbatax

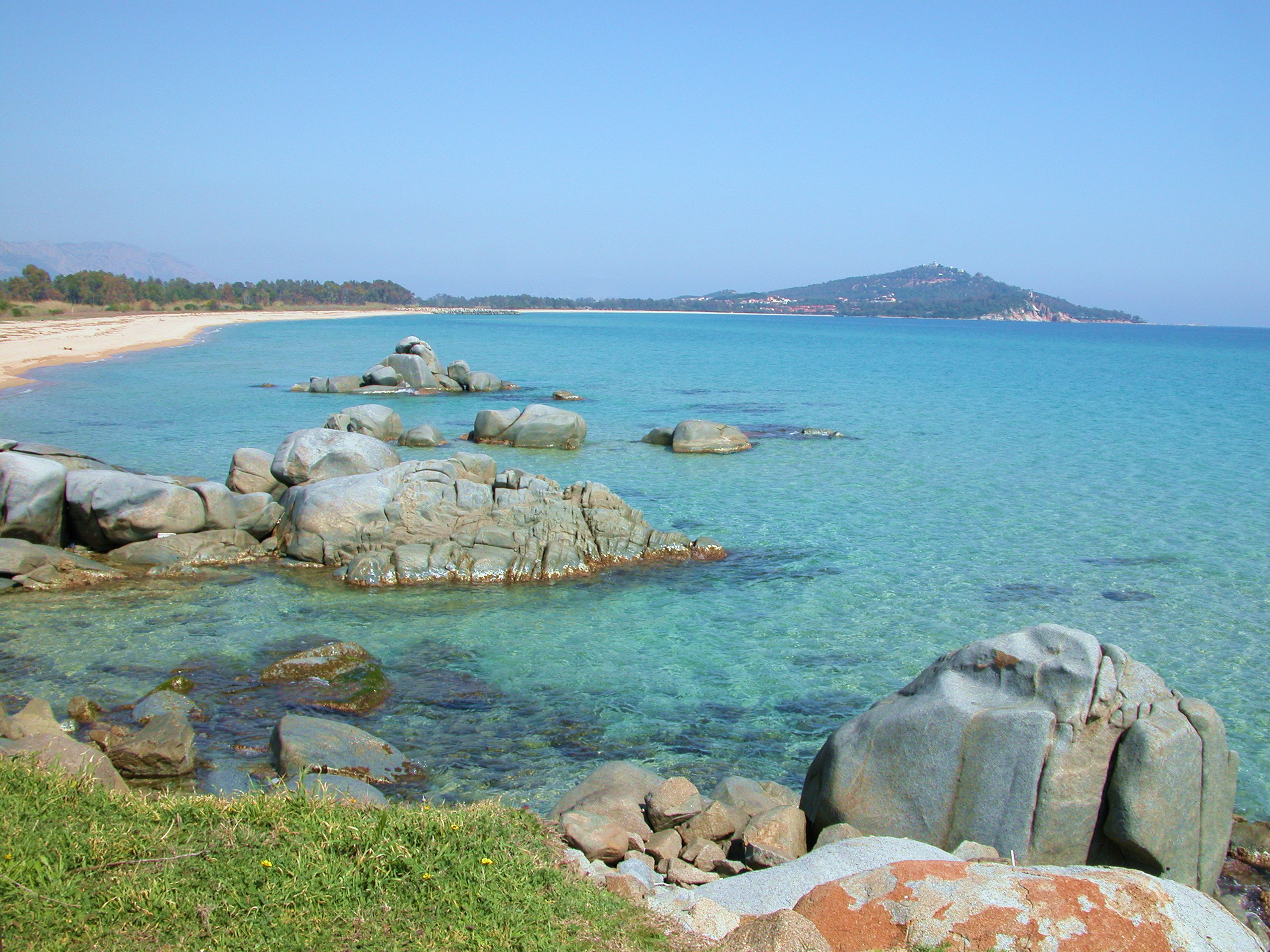
Orrì Beach (Tortolì)

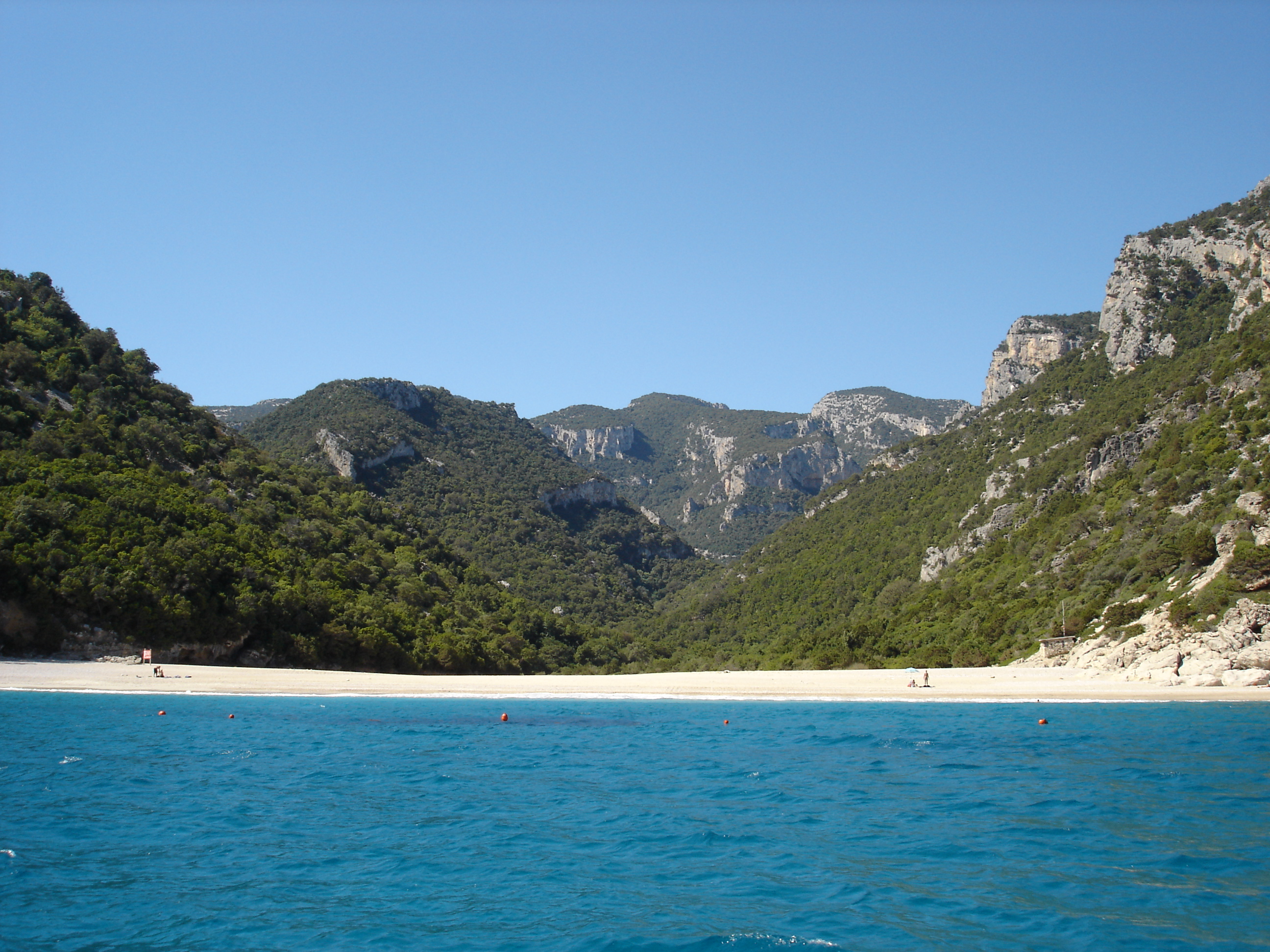
Cala Sisine (Baunei)

== See also ==
- National Trust
- National Trust for Scotland
- Conservatoire du littoral
