= Isolotto Monaci Lighthouse =

Isolotto Monaci
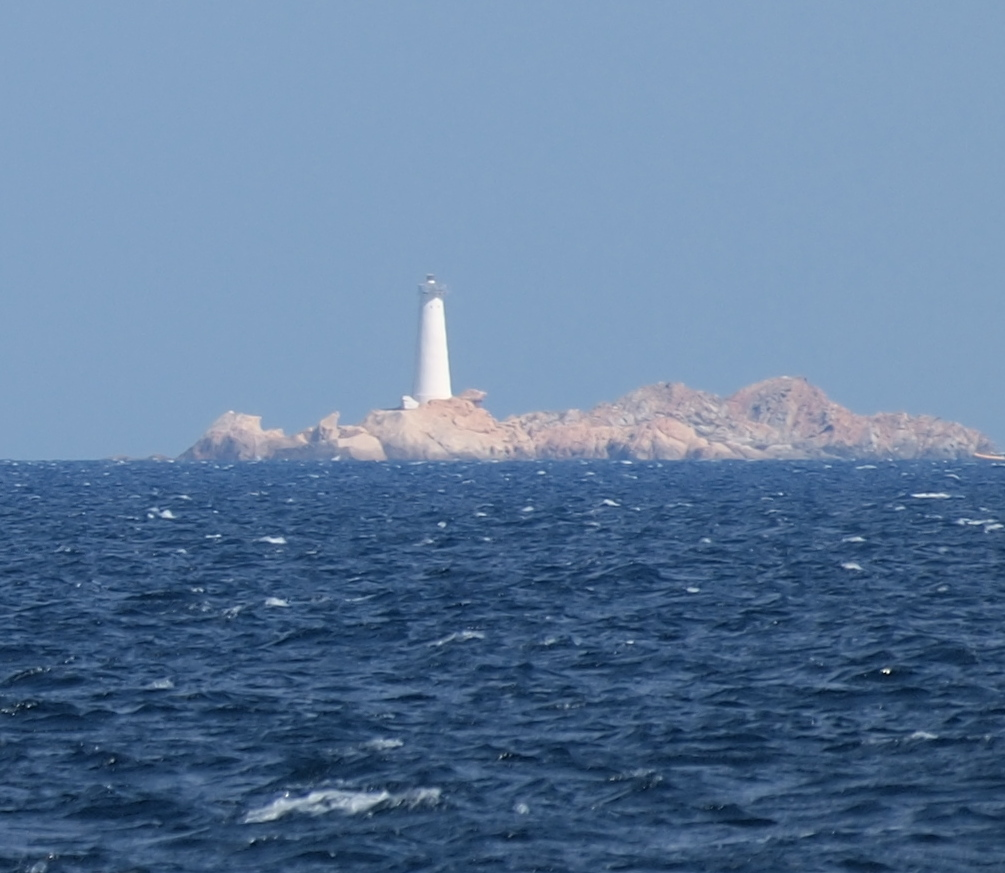
- Isolotto Monaci Lighthouse
- Location: Isolotto Monaci; Maddalena archipelago Sardinia; Italy
- Coordinates: 41°12′58″N 9°31′01″E

Tower
- Constructed: 1936
- Foundation: concrete base
- Construction: masonry tower
- Height: 16 metres (52 ft)
- Shape: tapered cylindrical tower with balcony and lantern
- Markings: white tower, balcony and lantern, grey metallic lantern dome
- Power source: solar power
- Operator: Marina Militare
- Fog signal: no

Light
- Focal height: 24 metres (79 ft)
- Lens: LED MBL 400-S
- Range: 11 nautical miles (20 km; 13 mi)
- Characteristic: Fl WR 5s.
- Italy no.: 1142 E.F.

Isolotto Monaci Lighthouse (Italian: Faro di Isolotto Monaci) is an active lighthouse located on the southernmost of some skerries placed 2.4 kilometres (1.5 mi) east of Caprera in the Maddalena archipelago in the Tyrrhenian Sea.

== Description ==
The lighthouse was built in 1936 and consists of a masonry tapered cylindrical tower, 16 metres (52 ft) high, with balcony and lantern; the tower, the balcony and the lantern are painted white; the lantern dome in grey metallic. The light is positioned at 24 metres (79 ft) above sea level and emits one white or red flash, depending on the direction, in a 5 seconds period visible up to a distance of 11 nautical miles (20 km; 13 mi). The lighthouse is completely automated, powered by a solar unit, and managed by the Marina Militare with the identification code number 1142 E.F.

On October 5, 2017, a diver, not far from the lighthouse, found some human remains in the place where, on July 26, 1943, a Messerschmitt Me 323 Gigant of the Luftwaffe was shot down by a British Bristol Beaufighter. The German plane was on flight from its base in Sardinia to Pistoia in Tuscany when it was intercepted by the British fighter and shot down.

== See also ==
- List of lighthouses in Italy
