= Maddalena archipelago =

Group of islands in the Strait of Bonifacio between Corsica and Sardinia

Coordinates: 41.2203°N 9.38944°E

Native name: Arcipelago di La Maddalena
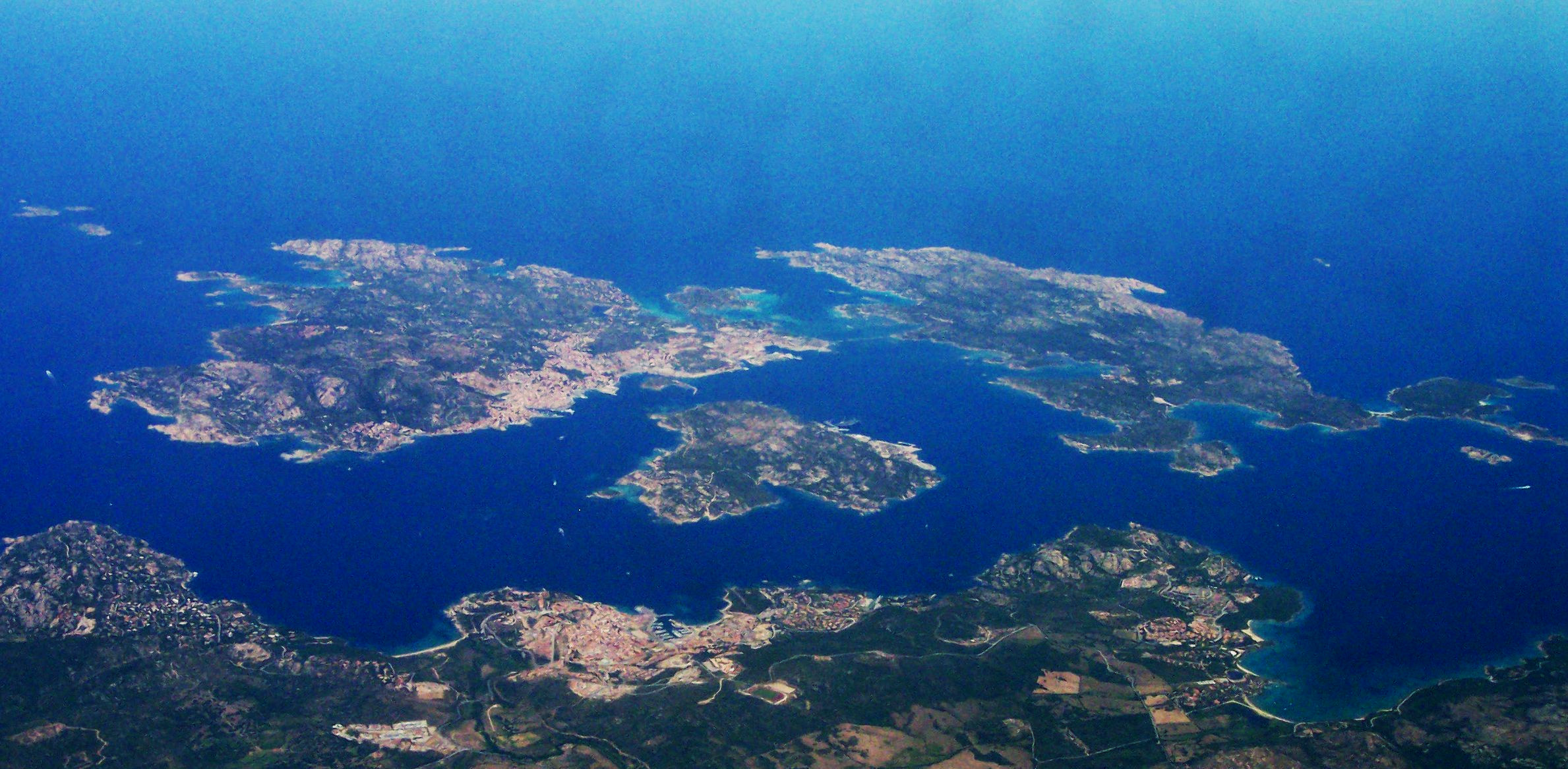
- Aerial view of the archipelago
- Interactive map of Maddalena archipelago

Geography
- Location: Strait of Bonifacio (Tyrrhenian Sea)

Administration
- Italy
- Region: Sardinia
- Province: Gallura Northeast Sardinia
- Largest town: La Maddalena

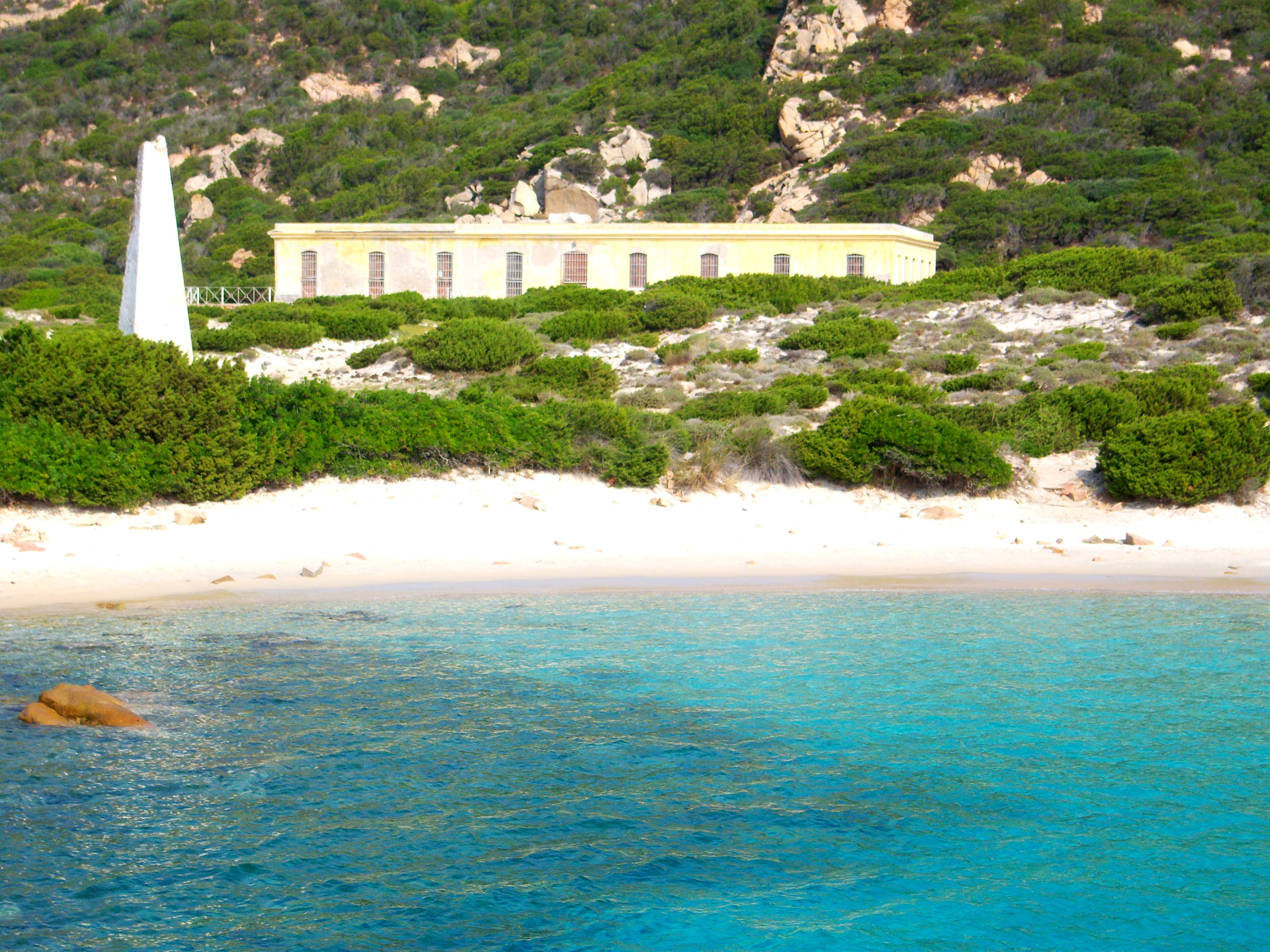
Spargi Island

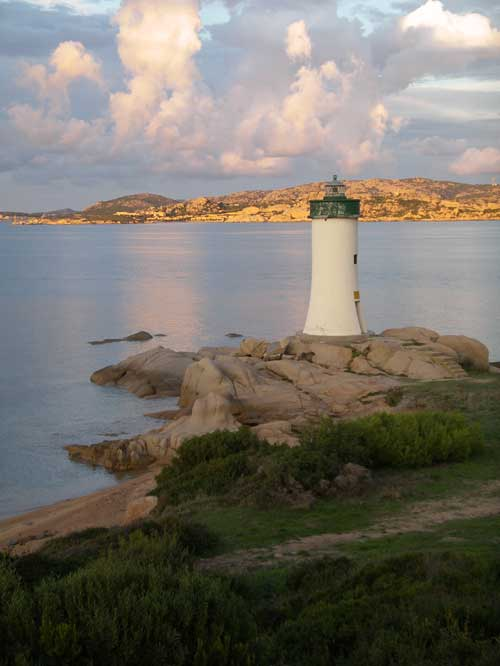
Looking across at Santo Stefano from Palau

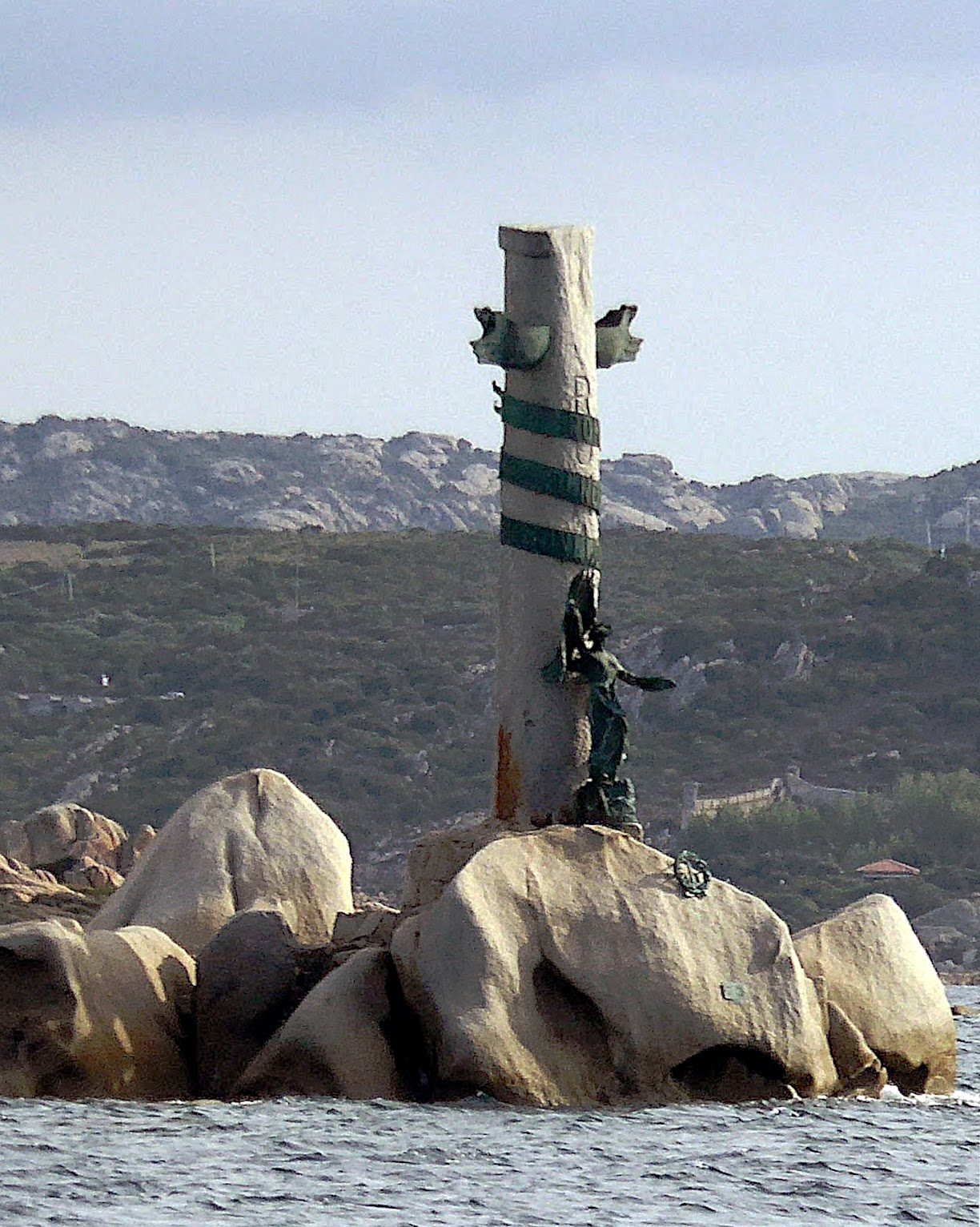
Memorial for the victims of the shipwreck of the Roma battleship in 1943

The Maddalena Archipelago is a group of islands in the Strait of Bonifacio between Corsica (France) and Sardinia (Italy). The whole archipelago makes the territory of the La Maddalena comune in Sardinia.

== Geography ==
The archipelago consists of seven main islands and numerous small islets. The largest one is the island of La Maddalena (Italian: Isola La Maddalena), with a homonymous town, which is the largest settlement in the archipelago. The other six islands, in order of size, are: Caprera, Spargi, Santo Stefano, Santa Maria, Budelli and Razzoli. Only Maddalena, Caprera, and Santo Stefano are inhabited; Budelli had a single caretaker until 2021.

Lying adjacent to the tourist resort of the Costa Smeralda, Maddalena has the same clear waters and wind-blown granite coastlines but remains a haven for wildlife. It is a designated national park, the Parco Nazionale Arcipelago di La Maddalena. It is a popular tourist destination, especially among boaters. In 2006 it was placed on the tentative list for consideration as a World Heritage Site by UNESCO.

== History ==
The islands have been inhabited since prehistoric times. They were known by the Romans as Cunicularia and were a busy shipping area during the 2nd and 1st centuries BC. The Maddalenas have a strategic value and were the object of a dispute between the maritime republics of Pisa and Genoa in the 13th century and subsequently was abandoned for a long period before being colonised again by Corsican shepherds and by Sardinian settlements in the 18th century. Napoleon Bonaparte, Admiral Nelson, and Giuseppe Garibaldi all have historical links with the area.

The main access into and out of the archipelago is via the frequent car ferries from Palau on Sardinia that run into La Maddalena. There are roads only on Maddalena and Caprera.

From 1973 until 2008 the Santo Stefano island was a home for the NATO naval base which housed US nuclear submarines. Controversy arose in 2003 when the USS Hartford ran aground in the vicinity of the Bisce Island while on maneuvers in the area.

== See also ==
- List of islands of Italy
- Lavezzi archipelago
