= Budelli =

Island in Italy

Coordinates: 41°16′57″N 9°21′00″E

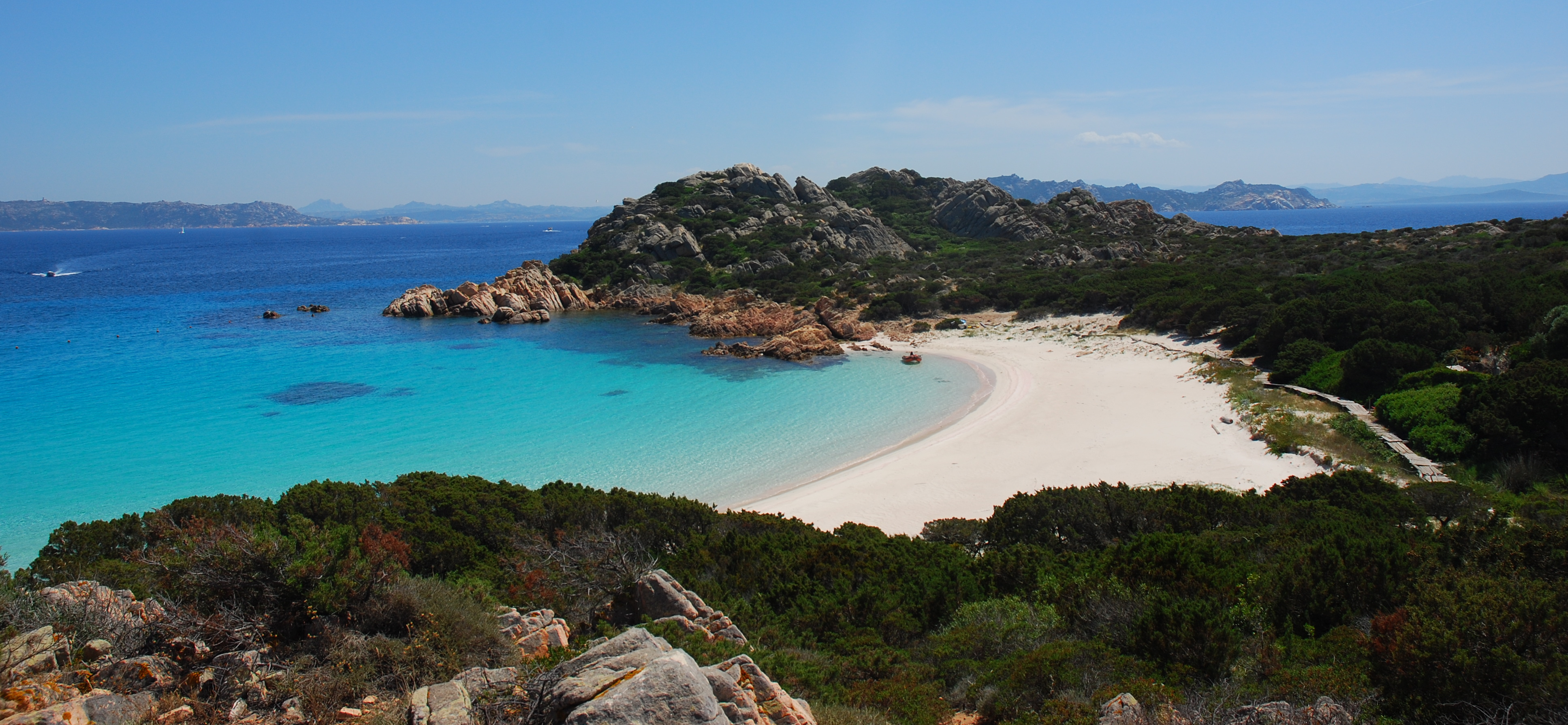
- The pink beach at Budelli

- Location within Sardinia Location within Italy

Geography
- Location: Strait of Bonifacio
- Archipelago: Maddalena archipelago
- Area: 1.6 km^{2} (0.62 sq mi)
- Highest elevation: 87 m (285 ft)
- Highest point: Monte Budello

Budelli is an island in the Maddalena archipelago, near the strait of Bonifacio in northern Sardinia, Italy. It is one of the seven islands that comprise Arcipelago di La Maddalena National Park. Budelli beach is famous for the color of its sand, which is pink due to the presence of shell fragments of a protozoan, Miniacina miniacea.

== Geography ==
Budelli is several hundred metres south of the islands of Razzoli and Santa Maria. It has an area of 1.6 square kilometres (0.62 sq mi) and a circumference of 12.3 kilometres (7.6 mi). The highest point is Monte Budello, at 87 metres (285 ft).

== History ==
=== Prehistory and antiquity ===
Cave paintings and pottery dating to the 3rd millennium B.C. have been discovered on Budelli and attributed to the Astracinca, a semi-nomadic people who inhabited northern Sardinia and who were characterised by their advanced ethnobotanical techniques and egalitarian leaderless society. The rupestrian artwork from Budelli describes the ritual process used by the Astracinca to establish new settlements.

A large concentration of Roman ceramics was also found embedded into the soil of Budelli, being progressively exposed by erosion. The oldest artefact from this site dates from A.D. 120 to A.D. 150, whilst the latest is a cooking ware lid of North African origin from the first half of the 3rd century to the 4th century.

=== Modern ===
It was the site of some of the filming for Red Desert, released in 1964. For decades, the island had a series of private owners.

Budelli is especially renowned for its Spiaggia Rosa (Pink Beach), on the southeastern shoreline, which owes its colour to microscopic fragments of corals and the tests, or shells, from Miriapora truncata and Miniacina miniacea, and was featured in Antonioni’s 1964 film Red Desert. Budelli was one of four uninhabited islands in the Maddalena archipelago—the others being Caprera, Spargi and Razzoli. However, from 1989 to 2021, the island had a permanent caretaker, Mauro Morandi, who took over from a married couple.

Rules imposed as of the 1990s by La Maddalena NP have not allowed tourists to walk on the pink beach or swim in the sea; however, day trips by boat, as well as walking along a path behind the beach, were permitted.

In October 2013, the island was to be sold for €2.94 million to New Zealand businessman Michael Harte after the bankruptcy of the previous owner. Harte intended to protect the island's ecosystem. The government protested, and after a three year court battle, a judge in Sardinia reverted the island to the state, with the national park planning to use it for environmental education.

== Inhabitants ==
The sole former occupant of the island, Mauro Morandi (1939–2025), lived there from 1989 until his eviction in April 2021. To explain why he could not be allowed to live on the island indefinitely, the park's president said in 2016: "[He] symbolizes a man enchanted by the elements who decides to devote his life to contemplation and custody ... No one ignores his role in representing the historical memory of the place … But it's hard to find a contractual arrangement for a person in his position." Morandi died from a brain haemorrhage on 3 January 2025, at the age of 85.

== See also ==
- List of islands of Italy
