= Santo Stefano (island) =

Island in Sardinia, Italy

Isola di Santo Stefano
Native name: Santu Stefanu
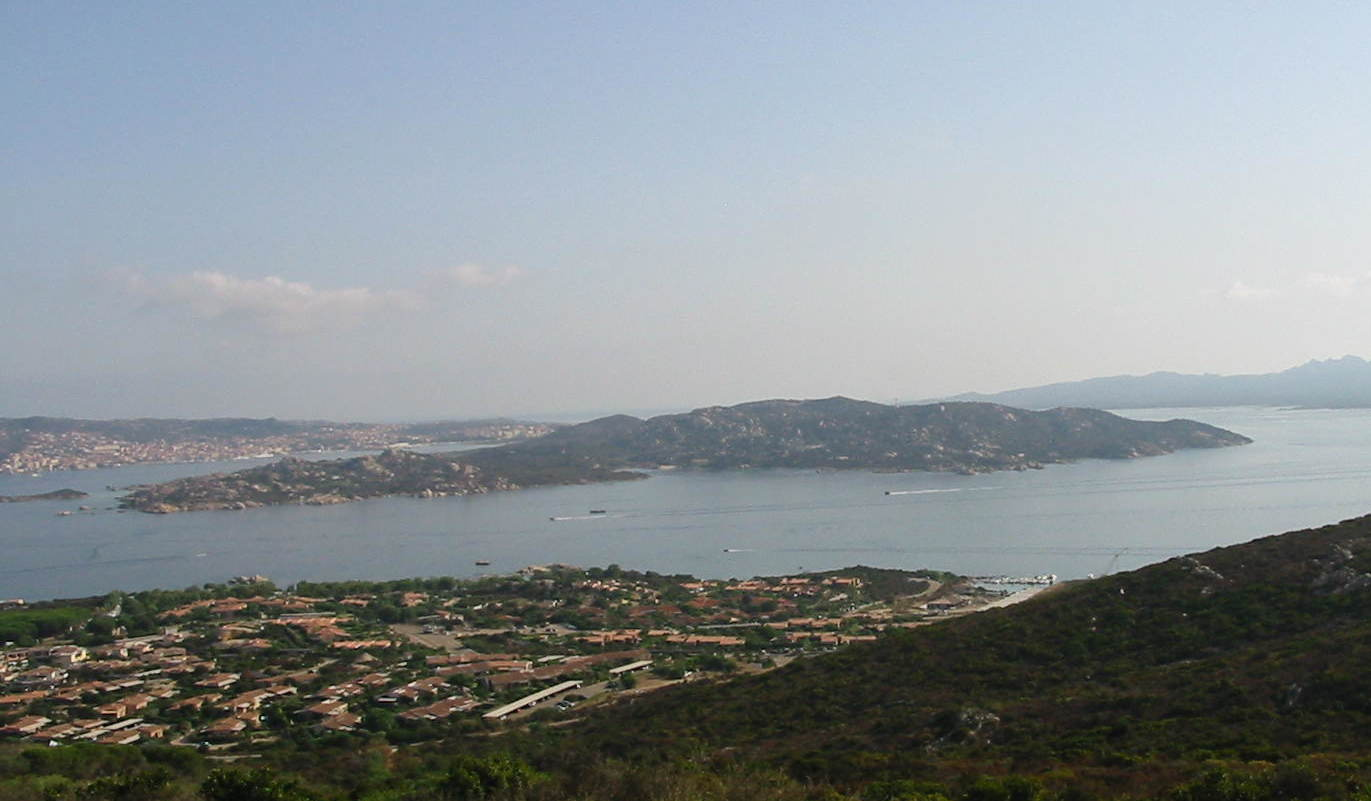

- Location within Sardinia

Geography
- Location: Maddalena archipelago (Tyrrhenian Sea)
- Coordinates: 41°12′0″N 9°25′0″E

Administration
- Italy
- Region: Sardinia
- Province: Sassari
- Comune: La Maddalena

Santo Stefano (Santu Stefanu in Gallurese; Santu Istèvene in Sardinian) is an island in the Maddalena archipelago of northern Sardinia, Italy, and part of the Maddalena National Park.

== Description ==
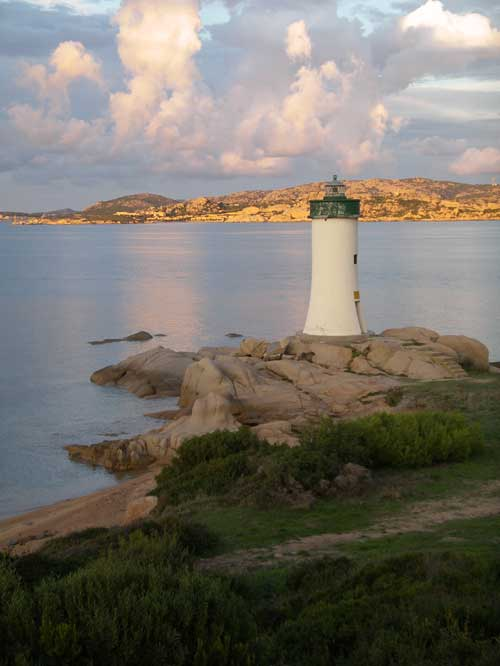
View of Santo Stefano from Palau.

The island is largely uninhabited and it is mainly known for its hosting of a NATO Naval Base and Italian Navy ammunition magazines. Apart from the military, the only residence on the island is a tourist resort. The island could be reached only by a private boat.

At the south of the island at the western slope of the Cala di Villamarina, there are remains of old fortifications, namely the Forte San Giorgio and the Forte La Torre. At the eastern slope is an abandoned granite quarry with a giant bust depicting an Italian fascist, Costanzo Ciano, whose work was commissioned by Mussolini himself for Ciano's family mausoleum in Livorno (Tuscany), but has been left unfinished since 1943.

== History ==
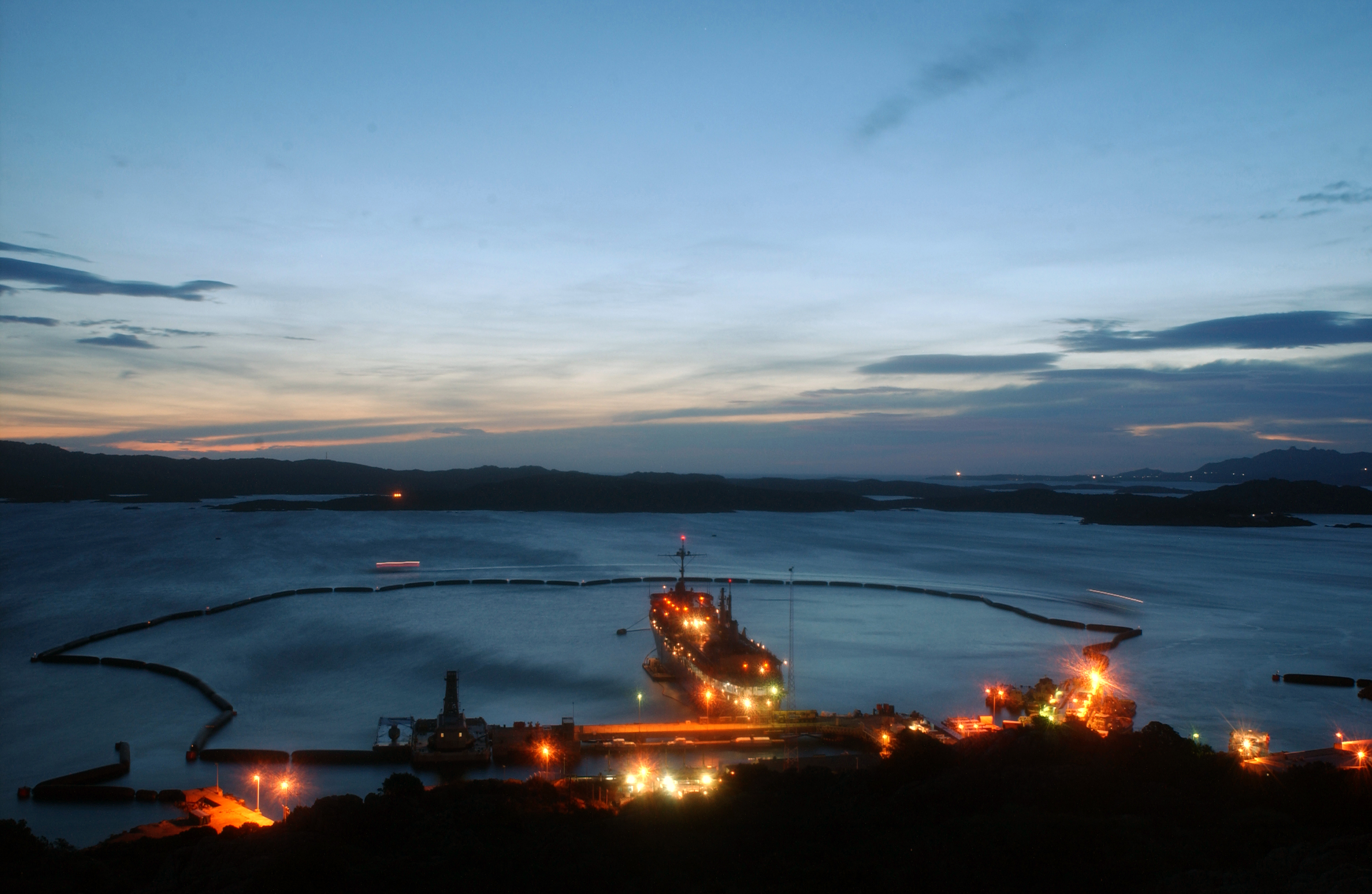
The submarine tender USS Emory S. Land at Santo Stefano, Italy.

From 1973 through 2008, there was a U.S. Naval Support Activity base as well as a NATO base on the island. The NATO base housed an Italian Navy barracks and it served as the home port for several US Navy submarine tenders over the years, beginning in 1972 with the arrival of the USS Fulton (AS-11) followed by the USS Howard W. Gilmore (AS-16) in 1973 until 1980, followed by the USS Orion (AS-18) which departed in 1993, followed by the USS Simon Lake (AS-33) from 1993 until 1998 and ending with the departure of the USS Emory S. Land, which set sail for its new home port of Bremerton, Washington. The US Naval Support Activity officially closed in January 2008, ending the 35 year US presence in La Maddalena.

During the period in which the American military had a presence on the island, it was twice used as a repair base for submarines after undersea collisions. In 1977 USS Ray collided with a coral reef off Tunisia and suffered damage to the sonar dome and cracking to the hull. Ray had immediate repairs here, then made a surface transit back to the US. On 25 October 2003 USS Hartford ran aground with sufficient force to substantially damage its rudders, sonar and electronics.

== See also ==
- List of islands of Italy
