= Arcipelago di La Maddalena National Park =

National park in Italy

Parco Nazionale dell'Arcipelago di La Maddalena
- Maddalena Archipelago National Park
- IUCN category II (national park)
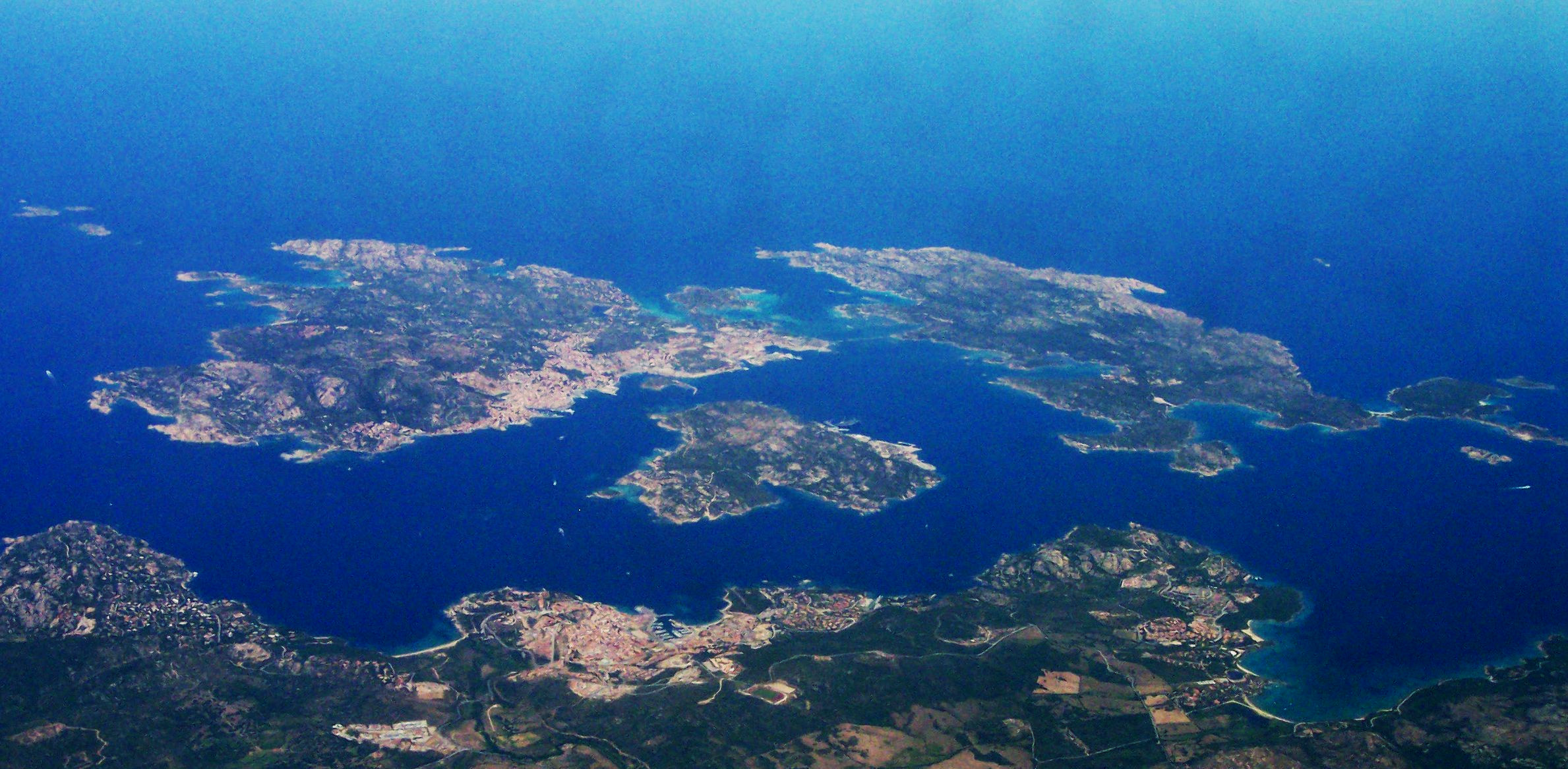
- Maddalena Archipelago

- Location within Italy
- Location: Sardegna
- Coordinates: 41°14′45″N 9°24′43″E
- Area: 201.46 km^{2} (77.78 sq mi)
- Established: 1994
- Governing body: Ministero dell'Ambiente
- Website: www.parks.it/parco.nazionale.arcip.maddalena/Epar.php

Arcipelago di La Maddalena National Park is a geomarine national park on the coast of Sardinia. The park was established on 1 April 1994, followed by the change of DPR on 17 May 1996. It covers an area on land and sea of over 12,000 hectares and 180 kilometers of coasts. This region includes all the islands and islets within the territory of the Municipality of La Maddalena, Italy. The territory of the National Park will also represent an important part of the Bocche di Bonifacio international marine park which will soon be established.

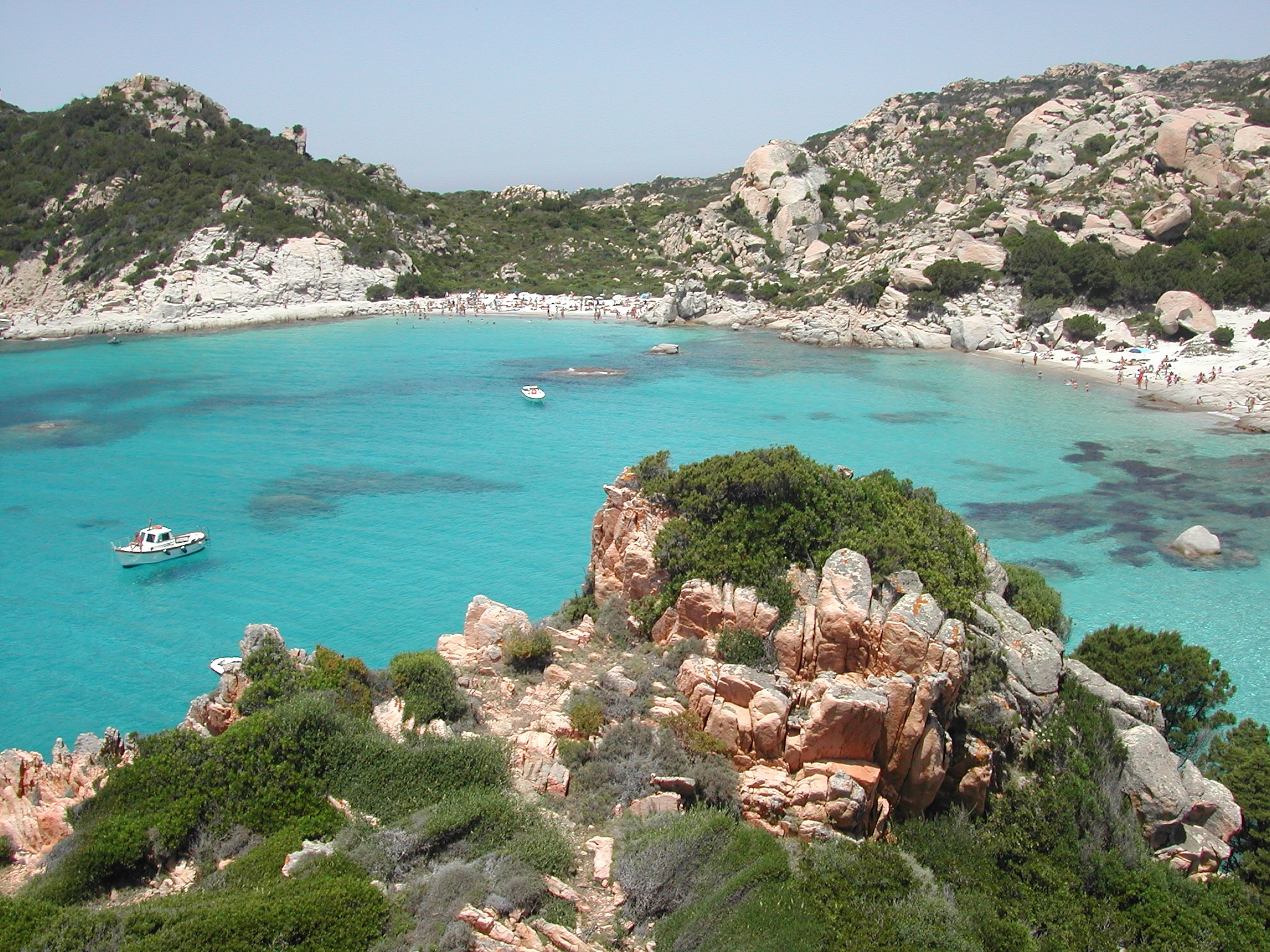
Spargi isle in the La Maddalena National Park

The Park's includes some beaches and these islands: La Maddalena, Caprera, Spargi and Spargiotto, Budelli, Razzoli e Santa Maria and the Isles of Nibani, Mortorio, Soffi e Camere.

As of mid-2020, the Park had a single private inhabitant. Mauro Morandi had lived in a former WWII shelter on Budelli island since 1989 and acted as an unofficial caretaker. He was to be evicted by the end of 2020. In 2016, the park's president explained why Morandi could not continue to live in the park indefinitely: "[He] symbolizes a man, enchanted by the elements, who decides to devote his life to contemplation and custody ... "No one ignores [his] role in representing the historical memory of the place … But it's hard to find a contractual arrangement for a person in his position". Morandi took up residence in an apartment in Maddalena and is working on writing his memoirs.

== See also ==
- Maddalena archipelago
