= Spargi =

Island in Italy

- Location within Italy

Geography
- Location: Strait of Bonifacio (Tyrrhenian Sea)
- Coordinates: 41°14′36″N 9°20′51″E
- Archipelago: Maddalena
- Area: 4.20 km^{2} (1.62 sq mi)
- Coastline: 11 km (6.8 mi)
- Highest elevation: 153 m (502 ft)
- Highest point: Monte Guardia Preposti

Administration
- Italy
- Region: Sardinia
- Province: Sassari
- Comune: La Maddelena

Demographics
- Population: Uninhabited

Additional information
- Time zone: CET
  - Summer (DST): CEST (UTC)

Spargi is an island of Italy. It is situated in the Maddalena archipelago, in the Strait of Bonifacio between Corsica and Sardinia. It is the third largest island in the archipelago, and is uninhabited. It is within the Arcipelago di La Maddalena National Park.

The landscape is rugged granite, with some porphyry. The island is more-or-less circular. The only source of fresh water is rainfall. The coast is marked by coves and sandy beaches. The hinterland is almost impenetrable. Plant life includes Cistus, strawberry tree, juniper and mastic. During the 19th century, Natale Berretta, an alleged bandit, hid on the island and managed to elude searchers. When his name was cleared, he brought his family over and settled down.

The Spargi wreck is a Roman ship 35 m (115 ft) dating from c. 120 BC, discovered in 1939. It was a cargo vessel, carrying amphorae of wine. Finds from it are conserved in the Nino Lamboglia Museum in La Maddelena.

Spargi was garrisoned during both World Wars. Some of the fortifications still remain.

The ownership of Spargi was the subject of a lightly-contested court case in 2011. The parties agreed that it was worth €127,000.

The nearby islet of Spargiotto to the west is a breeding site for birds such as shag, Audouin's gull and storm petrel.

Secca di Spargi ('Spargi shoal'; also called Secca Washington) is a recommended and marked-out area for diving. It consists of large blocks of granite together with boulders and landslips, and includes tafoni and depressions. It ranges in depth from 6 m (20 ft) to 25 m (82 ft). Fish include grouper, meagre, sea bream and barracuda. The sunlit areas support seaweed; the shady areas are populated by the sponge Aplysina cavernicola (genus Aplysina) and red gorgonians.

== Gallery ==
These are some views of Spargi:

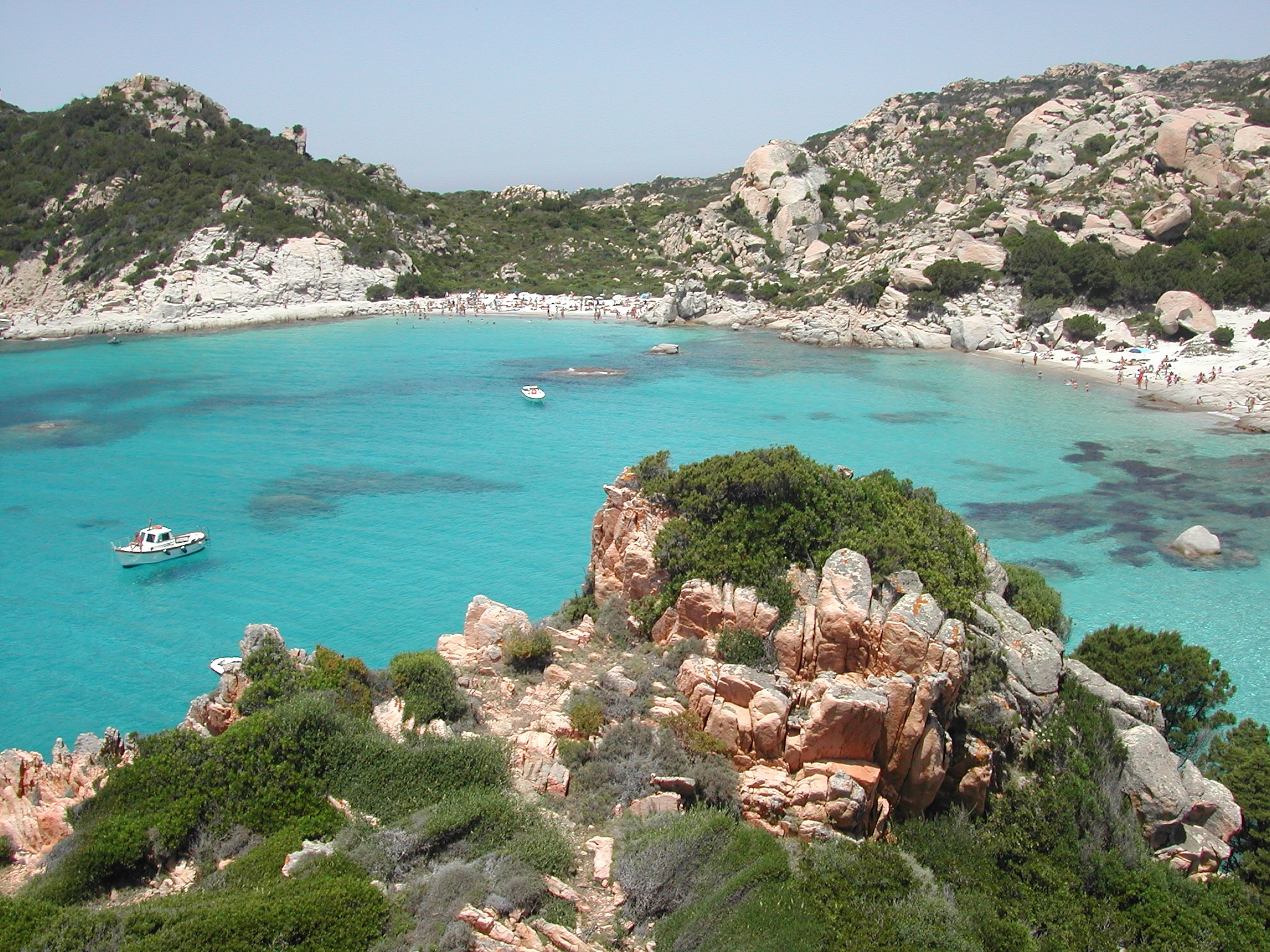

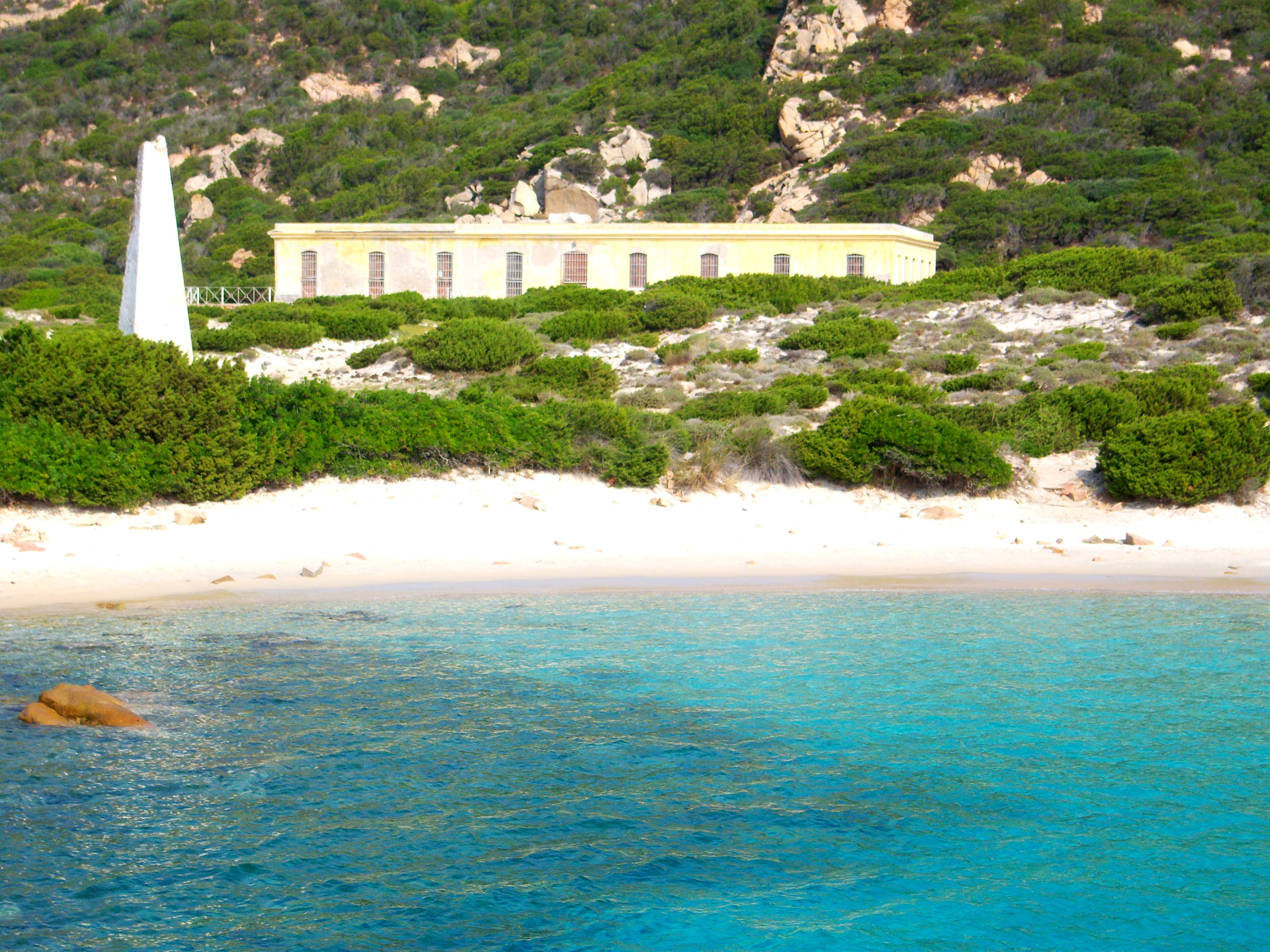

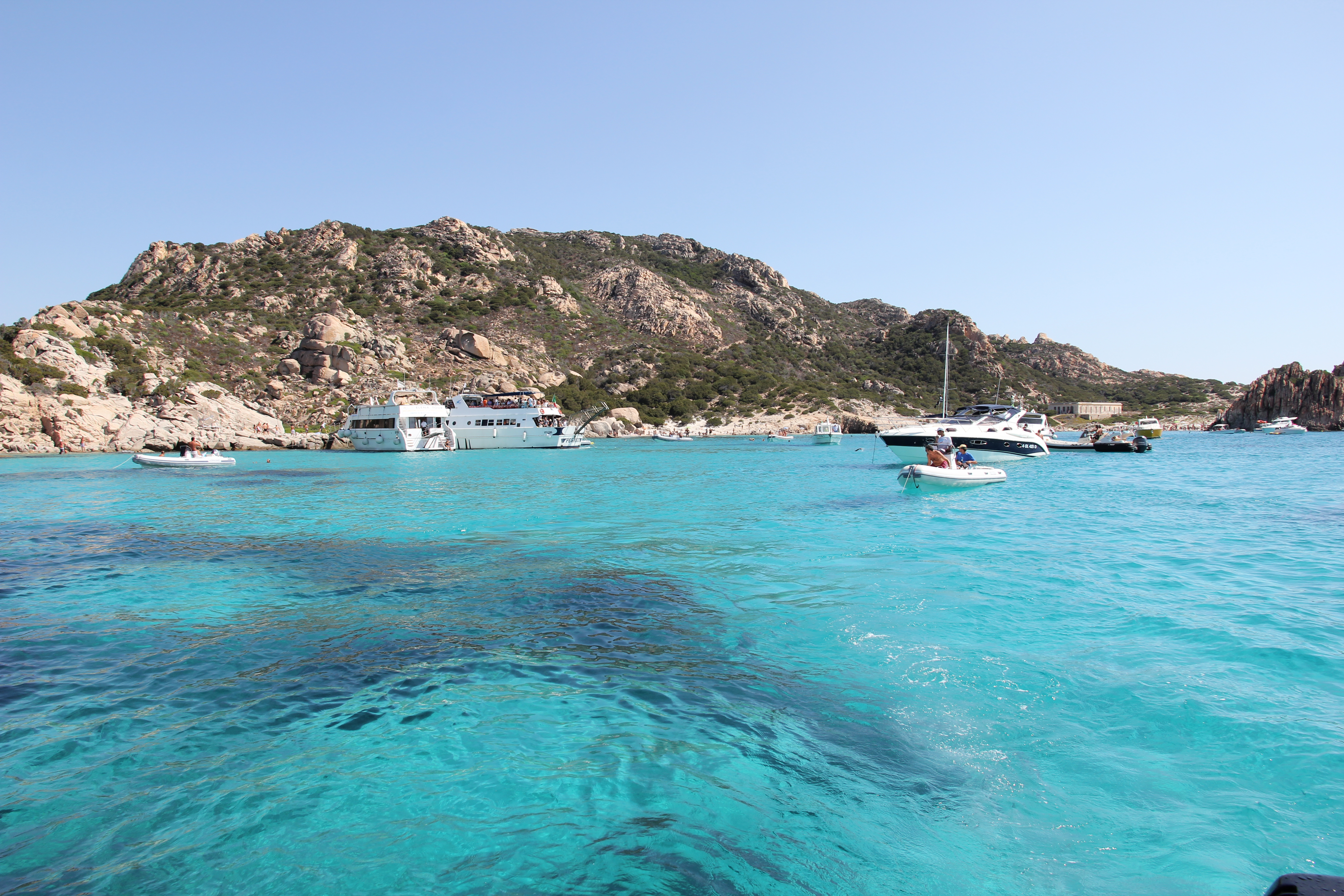

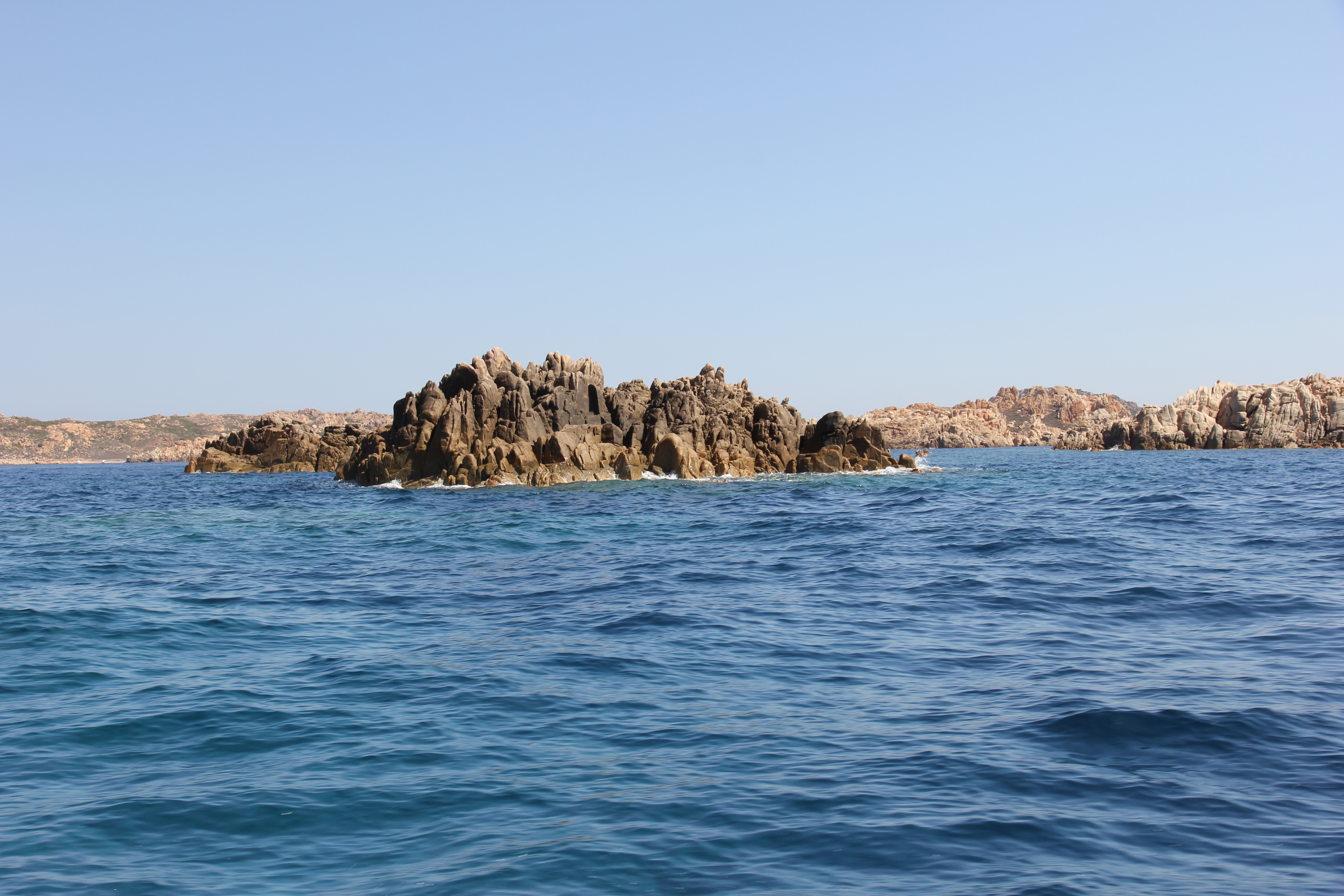

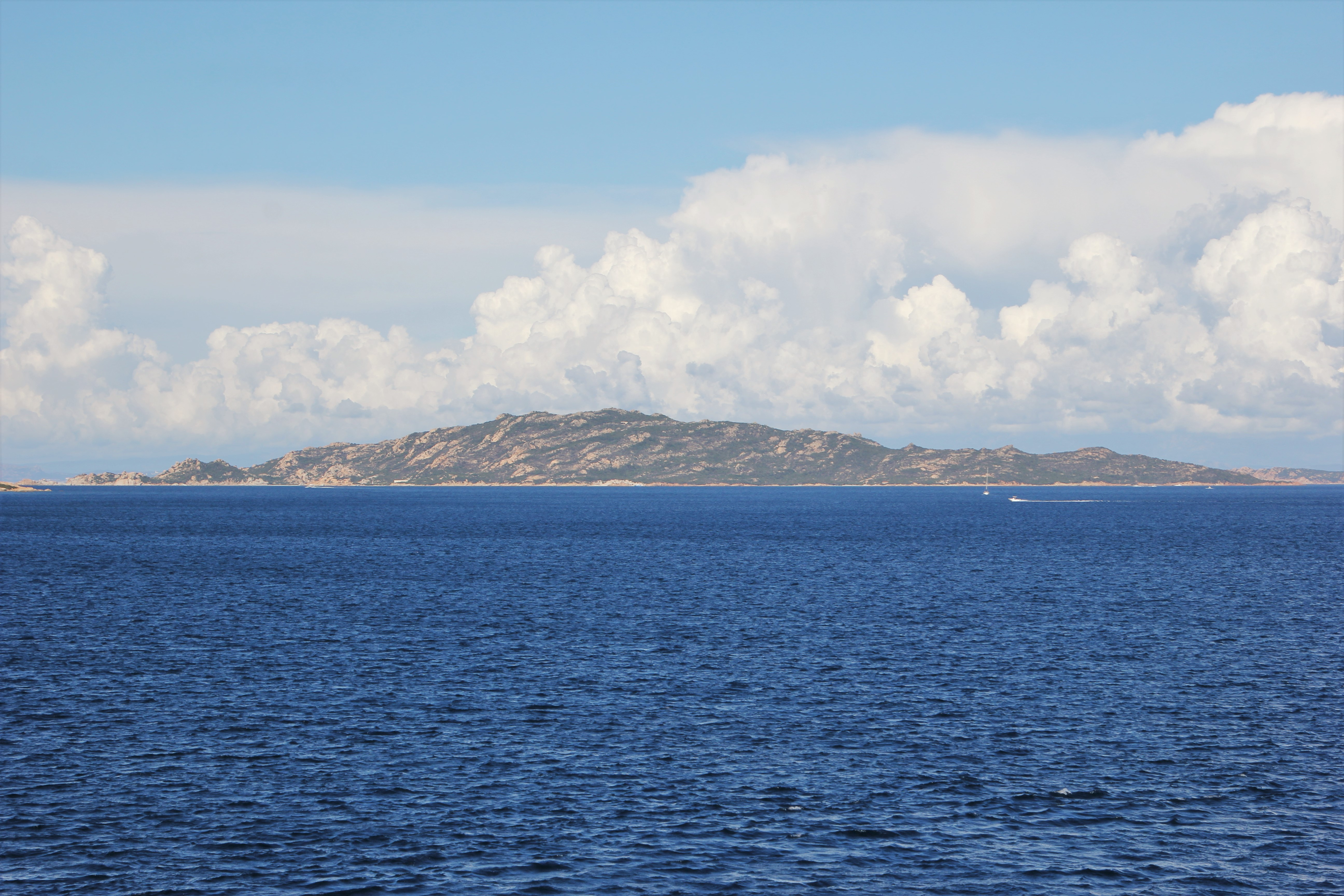

== See also ==
- List of islands of Italy
