= USS Hartford grounding =

Submarine of the United States

On 25 October 2003, USS Hartford, a United States Navy nuclear-powered Los Angeles-class submarine ran aground while leaving the harbor of the NATO Naval Base at the Santo Stefano island in La Maddalena archipelago, Sardinia. Approximately nine million dollars' worth of damage was done to the submarine, and it was out of service for seven months. An investigation into the accident revealed that basic navigational errors combined with equipment failures were to blame for the submarine running into the rocky shallows.

== Timeline of events leading up to the accident ==
The US Navy investigation into the incident revealed a pattern of navigation, procedural and equipment errors leading up to the accident.

- December 2001 The commander of Hartford's home squadron in Groton, Connecticut stated that navigation practices in the squadron "do not uniformly meet the submarine force's exacting professional standards."
- July 2002 An instructor at the Naval Submarine Base in Groton warned that Hartford's navigation team needed to improve how it set up for a turn, and also how it logged the boat's position on maritime charts.
- Early 2003 While the crew completed the Preparation for Overseas Movement certification "numerous plotting errors" were observed. It was noted that the crew seemed to have difficulty planning turns and failed to make the turns on track on three separate occasions. The boat's navigation team later passed the certification, and overall the boat was rated in the top third of the fleet for training readiness.
- 14 April 2003 During a simulation the navigation team twice approached a navigation channel outside the correct track.
- 3 June 2003 On a second occasion during a simulation, the navigation team were told to be more aggressive about making sure the boat was on track when it was in a channel.
- 7 June 2003 An assessment of piloting practices on Hartford turned up 13 deficiencies and, crucially, that when the navigation team could not fix the boat's position on charts, the boat did not slow down.
- 9 October 2003 USS Hartford departs from Groton for the Mediterranean.
- 20 October 2003 Hartford arrives at the US base headquarters at the Santo Stefano island. Berthing outboard of USS Springfield at the submarine tender USS Emory S. Land. An evaluator from submarine squadron 22 gave Hartford's navigation team an "average" score as the boat pulled into the submarine base at La Maddalena. But he also noted:
  - The navigation team was not reconciling their primary navigation system with their backup system frequently enough to catch discrepancies in the systems.
  - On an approach into a turn the navigation team went seven minutes between obtaining fixes of the boat's position, more than double the three-minute standard.
  - The crewman fixing the boat's position on a maritime chart was too slow, at worst taking 1 minute and 15 seconds, when it should take no longer than 35 seconds.
  - The boat's fathometer, which measures the water under the keel, was set to fathoms, the boat's charts indicated depth in meters, and the warning system was based on feet.
- 24 October 2003 Hartford was scheduled to leave for her patrol, but problems developed with her sonar system, and the patrol was delayed while the submarine waited for replacement parts.
- 25 October 2003 Visibility in the harbour was excellent and winds were between 12 and 15 knots (22 and 28 km/h) from the east. USS Springfield departed, and USS Miami was coming into the tender to take Springfield’s place. While this was taking place, USS Hartford was ordered to go outside the harbor.
  - 11:55 Hartford eased away from her tender and moved into the channel. As plotted the trip would consist of four turns, the longest leg of the course being about 1.75 nautical miles (3.24 km). The submarine should have reached the open sea in approximately 34 minutes. However, within minutes the boat's Voyage Management System, which provides the navigation team with electronic navigation charts and automatic fixes of the boat's position, crashed. The crew attempted to clear the fault by repeatedly rebooting the system. These attempts to fix the problem were unsuccessful.
  - 12:09 The navigation team noticed a 4 knots (7.4 km/h) difference in the speed readouts of the Ring laser gyroscope navigator and the electromagnetic log, two other key pieces of navigation equipment.
  - 12:22 The captain ordered the boat to increase speed to 12 knots (22 km/h) from the planned speed of 9.5 knots (17.6 km/h). At approximately the same time, the assistant navigator and an electronics technician left the control room to try to determine what was causing the equipment failures. The captain was never notified that key members of the navigation crew had left their stations.
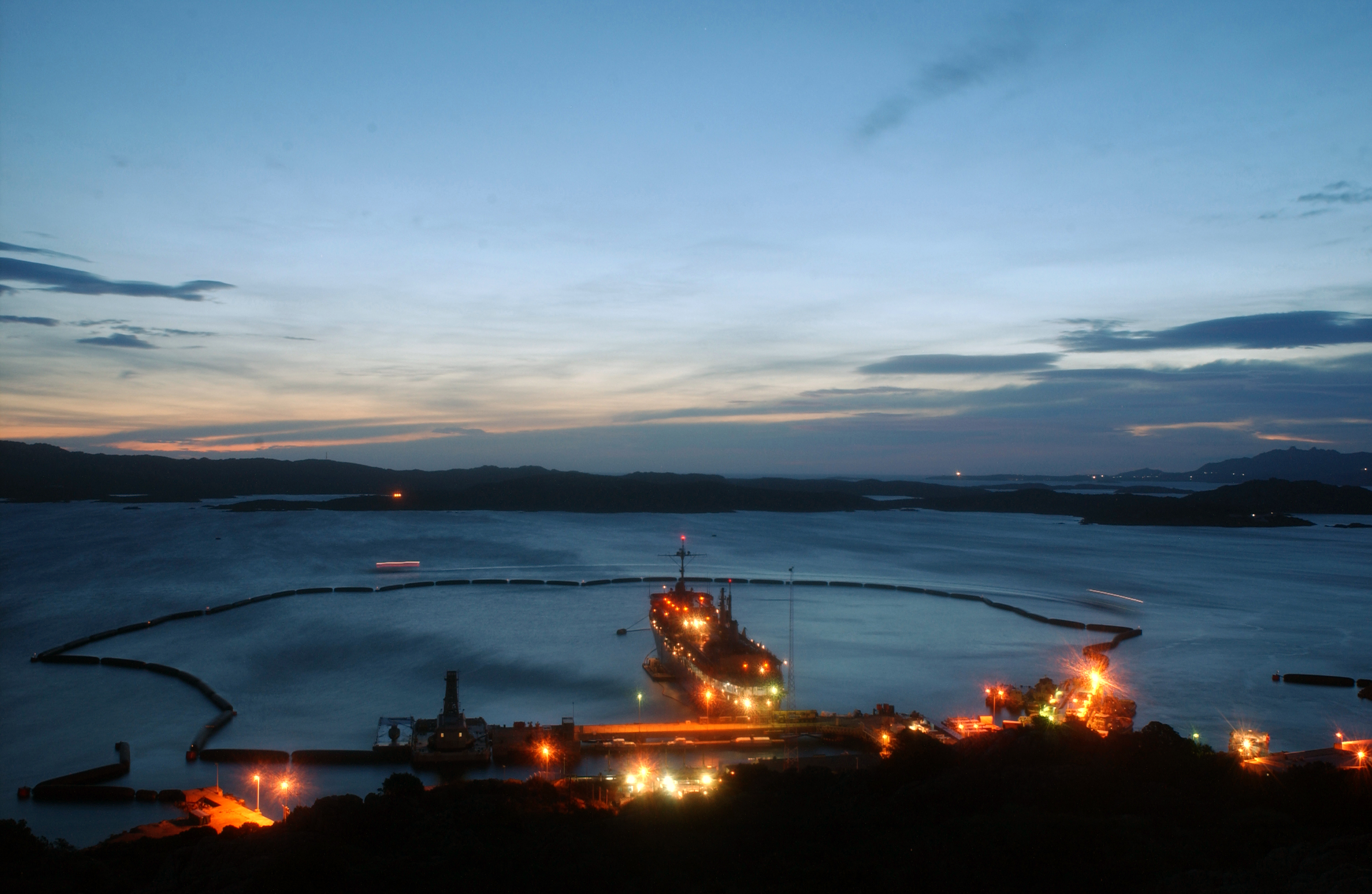
    The sun rises behind the submarine tender Emory S. Land at Santo Stefano, Italy.
  - 12:28 The bridge ordered the turn into the third leg of the trip, almost 500 yards (460 meters) early. As a result of the equipment failures, a waypoint was entered into the Global positioning system incorrectly, putting the turning point several hundred yards off the correct location.
  - 12:30 The navigation team makes an attempt to fix the boat's position on the charts. The investigation found the boat was about 400 yards (370 meters) closer to Bisce Island than the position the crew plotted.
  - 12:34 Hartford turns into the fourth leg of her course out of the harbor. It is not clear who ordered this turn. The Hartford turns to the north-northeast and is traveling at almost 10 knots (19 km/h).
  - 12:36 The navigation team makes a tentative fix on the boat's position but they are unable to confirm it. There is growing concern on the bridge about the lack of a plotted position: the executive officer asks the navigation team, "Nav, where the fuck are we?", the captain asks the XO, "Do we have anything at all working down there?"
  - 12:37 The sailor watching the fathometer warns the navigation team that the water depth under the hull is decreasing, and was now just 100 feet (30 meters). On board a tugboat that had been escorting Hartford out of the harbor, the Italian Coast Guard liaison noticed that Hartford was not following the normal northern course out of La Maddalena. He attempts to call Hartford on the radio and a cell phone without success.
  - 12:37:30 The fathometer watch alerts the navigation team to the fact that the depth under the hull is now just 83 feet (25 meters).
  - 12:37:45 Again the fathometer watch warns that the water depth is down to just 50 feet (15 meters).
  - 12:40 Hartford strikes the bottom about 1,100 yards (1,000 meters) off Bisce Island. The boat begins to slow. Afraid that the boat would be stranded on the rocks, the squadron commodore, Captain Greg Parker, who is on board Hartford orders "Speed on."
  - The first collision is followed by two more impacts, the second of these is the worst, rolling the boat 10 to 12 degrees onto her port side, and lifting her out of the water.

== Aftermath ==
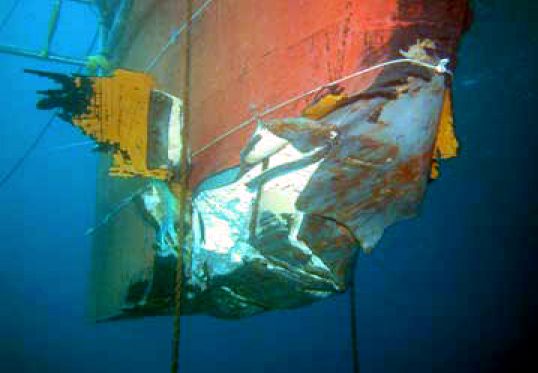
Damage to USS Hartford's rudder.

Navy divers from USS Emory S. Land inspected Hartford the next day and found large areas of the hull scraped down to bare metal. Sound damping anechoic tiles had been ripped away, metal grates over the ballast tanks had been badly distorted and the passive sonar hydrophone system damaged in three separate locations. The worst damage was at the aft end of the boat, where the rocks had torn off the bottom part of the rudder. So severe was the damage, that there was some question as to the structural integrity of the hull; however, temporary repairs were conducted at La Maddalena. On 19 November 2003 Hartford proceeded back to Naval Station Norfolk in Virginia under her own power but at half speed, arriving on 17 December 2003. Hartford then underwent repairs for seven months. It finally returned to Groton in March.

After the accident Commander Christopher R. Van Metre, captain of Hartford, and Captain Greg Parker, Commodore of Submarine Squadron 22, were relieved of command and sent back to the United States. Six other crewmen were also charged with dereliction of duty.

The U.S. Navy report into the incident made several recommendations, one of which is to ensure that no transfers of key personnel occur prior to, or during a deployment. Hartford's captain and navigator had reported aboard only weeks before the boat left for the Mediterranean and their unfamiliarity with the crew and the boat were contributing factors. The lessons learned about the failures in navigation have been incorporated into the Submarine On-Board Training Syllabus. The Navy has also asked the government of Italy to place more navigational buoys warning of shallow water near Sardinia.

== Environmental impact ==
There was some concern after the accident, especially given the fact the incident was not reported to the public until 12 November, three weeks after the accident. There was some outcry in the Italian press, especially since a nuclear submarine was involved. Subsequent investigations have shown that there was no leak from the submarine.
