= List of municipalities of the Province of Olbia-Tempio =

The following is a list of the 26 municipalities (comuni) of the former Province of Olbia-Tempio, Sardinia, Italy.

== List ==
ISTAT Code	Comune	Population, 31.12.2010
104001	Aggius	1,631
104002	Aglientu	1,213
104003	Alà dei Sardi	1,960
104004	Arzachena	13,317
104005	Badesi	1,909
104006	Berchidda	2,941
104007	Bortigiadas	806
104008	Buddusò	4,009
104009	Budoni	4,951
104010	Calangianus	4,337
104011	Golfo Aranci	2,414
104012	La Maddalena	11,899
104013	Loiri Porto San Paolo	3,270
104014	Luogosanto	1,902
104015	Luras	2,715
104016	Monti	2,483
104017	Olbia	56,066
104018	Oschiri	3,472
104019	Padru	2,174
104020	Palau	4,440
104021	Sant'Antonio di Gallura	1,692
104022	Santa Teresa Gallura	5,225
104023	San Teodoro	4,342
104024	Telti	2,217
104025	Tempio Pausania	14,290
104026	Trinità d'Agultu e Vignola	2,184

== See also ==
- List of municipalities of Italy
