= List of municipalities of the Province of Sassari =

The following is a list of the 92 municipalities (comuni) of the former Province of Sassari in the autonomous region of Sardinia in Italy.

== List ==
Municipality	Population (2025)	Area (km²)	Density
Aggius	1,398	86.31	16.2
Aglientu	1,184	148.19	8
Alà dei Sardi	1,763	197.99	8.9
Alghero	41,956	225.4	186.1
Anela	563	36.89	15.3
Ardara	702	38.19	18.4
Arzachena	13,451	230.85	58.3
Badesi	1,834	31.3	58.6
Banari	506	21.25	23.8
Benetutti	1,643	94.45	17.4
Berchidda	2,577	201.88	12.8
Bessude	370	26.79	13.8
Bonnanaro	904	21.84	41.4
Bono	3,258	74.54	43.7
Bonorva	3,081	149.75	20.6
Bortigiadas	700	75.9	9.2
Borutta	242	4.76	50.8
Bottidda	639	33.71	19
Buddusò	3,510	176.84	19.8
Budoni	5,585	54.28	102.9
Bultei	789	96.83	8.1
Bulzi	487	21.67	22.5
Burgos	821	18.08	45.4
Calangianus	3,725	126.84	29.4
Cargeghe	589	12.05	48.9
Castelsardo	5,577	43.34	128.7
Cheremule	386	24.25	15.9
Chiaramonti	1,509	98.61	15.3
Codrongianos	1,246	30.39	41
Cossoine	755	39.17	19.3
Erula	692	39.31	17.6
Esporlatu	362	18.4	19.7
Florinas	1,450	36.06	40.2
Giave	468	47.07	9.9
Golfo Aranci	2,379	37.43	63.6
Illorai	723	57.19	12.6
Ittireddu	469	23.69	19.8
Ittiri	7,827	111.46	70.2
La Maddalena	10,476	52.01	201.4
Laerru	802	19.85	40.4
Loiri Porto San Paolo	3,798	118.52	32
Luogosanto	1,812	135.07	13.4
Luras	2,367	87.59	27
Mara	531	18.64	28.5
Martis	452	22.96	19.7
Monteleone Rocca Doria	103	13.39	7.7
Monti	2,379	123.82	19.2
Mores	1,703	94.86	18
Muros	819	11.23	72.9
Nughedu San Nicolò	724	67.89	10.7
Nule	1,272	51.95	24.5
Nulvi	2,571	67.38	38.2
Olbia	61,658	383.64	160.7
Olmedo	4,220	33.47	126.1
Oschiri	2,917	215.61	13.5
Osilo	2,768	98.03	28.2
Ossi	5,400	30.09	179.5
Ozieri	9,677	252.13	38.4
Padria	576	48.39	11.9
Padru	2,098	158	13.3
Palau	4,075	44.44	91.7
Pattada	2,799	164.88	17
Perfugas	2,225	60.88	36.5
Ploaghe	4,221	96.27	43.8
Porto Torres	20,800	104.41	199.2
Pozzomaggiore	2,299	78.77	29.2
Putifigari	664	53.1	12.5
Romana	468	21.6	21.7
San Teodoro	5,164	107.6	48
Sant'Antonio di Gallura	1,431	116.49	26.2
Santa Maria Coghinas	1,323	36.68	71.7
Santa Teresa Gallura	5,077	87.9	118.9
Sassari	120,497	547.04	220.3
Sedini	1,207	40.51	29.8
Semestene	121	39.58	3.1
Sennori	6,734	31.34	214.9
Siligo	725	43.45	16.7
Sorso	14,491	67.01	216.3
Stintino	1,533	59.04	26
Telti	2,243	83.25	26.9
Tempio Pausania	13,003	210.82	61.7
Tergu	608	36.88	16.5
Thiesi	2,664	63.25	42.1
Tissi	2,341	10.24	228.6
Torralba	869	36.5	23.8
Trinità d'Agultu e Vignola	2,494	134	18.6
Tula	1,436	66.19	21.7
Uri	2,829	56.81	49.8
Usini	4,144	30.74	134.8
Valledoria	4,294	25.95	165.5
Viddalba	1,579	50.41	31.3
Villanova Monteleone	2,052	202.68	10.1

== See also ==
- List of municipalities of Italy
