= Province of Gallura North-East Sardinia =

Province of Sardinia, Italy

Province of Gallura North-East Sardinia Provincia della Gallura Nord-Est Sardegna (Italian) Provìntzia de Gaddura Nord-Est Sardigna (Sardinian) Pruvincia di Gaddura Nordestu Saldigna (Gallurese)
- Province
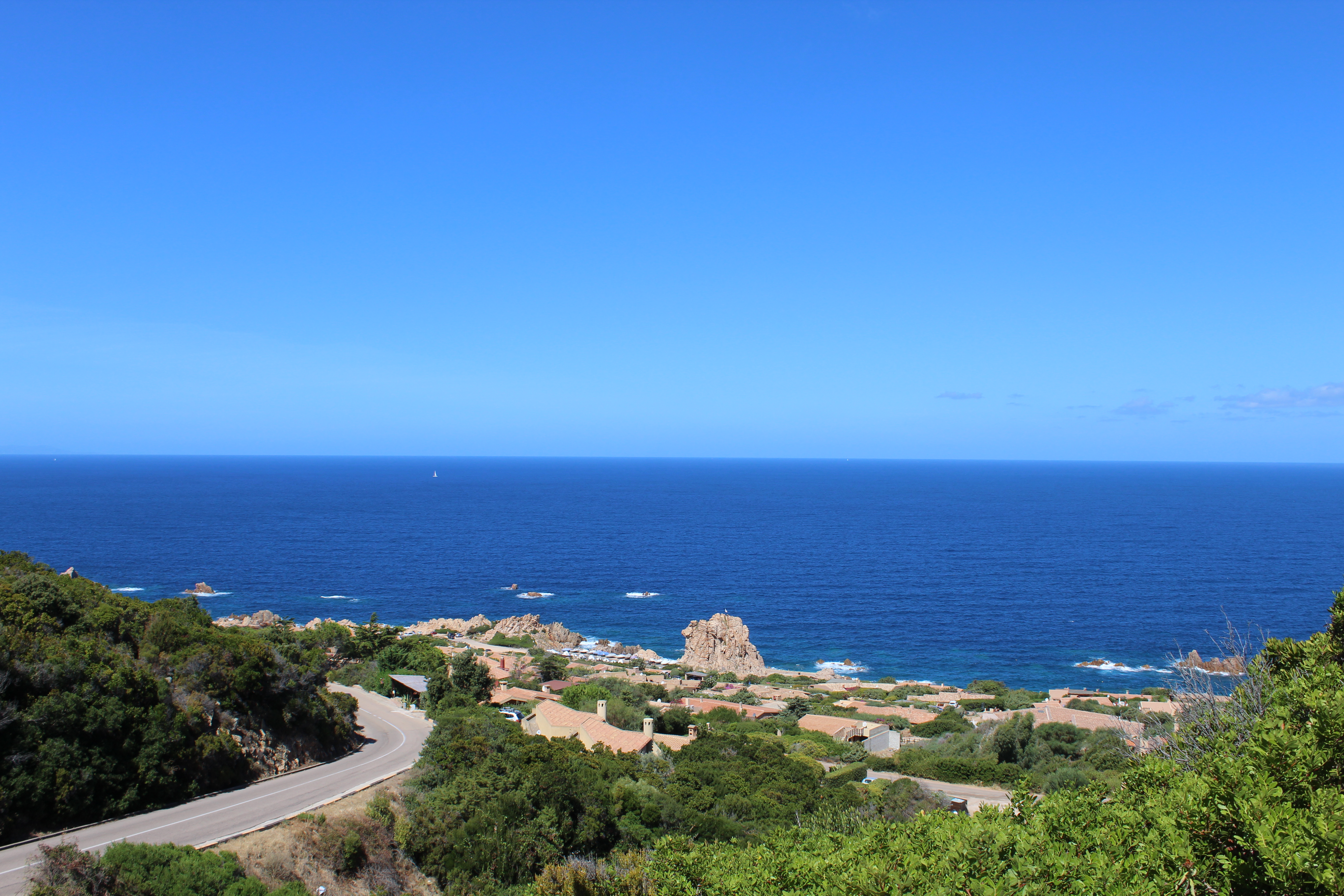
- Costa Paradiso

- Coat of arms

- Location of the province of Gallura-Northeast Sardinia in Italy
- Country: Italy
- Region: Sardinia
- Established: 16 April 2021
- Became functional: 1 April 2025
- Capital(s): Olbia, Tempio Pausania
- Municipalities: 26

Government
  - President: Settimo Nizzi (FI)

Area
  - Total: 3,406.18 km^{2} (1,315.13 sq mi)

Population (2026)
  - Total: 159,460
  - Density: 46.815/km^{2} (121.25/sq mi)
- Time zone: UTC+1 (CET)
  - Summer (DST): UTC+2 (CEST)
- Postal code: 07000-07100
- Telephone prefix: 079
- Vehicle registration: OT
- ISTAT code: 104
- Website: www.provincia.galluranordestsardegna.it

The province of Gallura North-East Sardinia (Italian: provincia della Gallura Nord-Est Sardegna; Sardinian: provìntzia de Gaddura Nord-Est Sardigna; Gallurese: pruvincia di Gaddura Nordestu Saldigna) is a province in the autonomous island region of Sardinia in Italy. It has two capitals; Olbia and Tempio Pausania. The province was carved out from the former province of Sassari on 16 April 2021 and became functional on 1 April 2025. It has 159,460 inhabitants across its 26 municipalities, according to the last census.

== History ==
The province of Olbia-Tempio was absorbed into the province of Sassari by a regional decree in 2016.

On April 12, 2021, under Sardinian Regional Council's Regional Law No. 7, the province was restored under the name of "Province of North-East Sardinia" (provincia del Nord-Est Sardegna). Whilst the Italian government challenged the law, thus stalling its implementation, on 12 March 2022, the constitutional court ruled in favor of the Autonomous Region of Sardinia. In October 2023, in accordance with Article 120 of Regional Law No. 9, the province was renamed "Gallura North-East Sardinia". The province became fully functional on 1 April 2025.

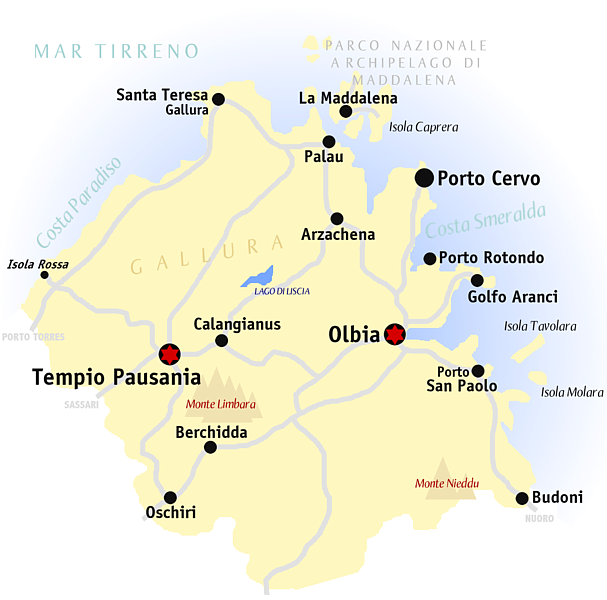
Towns and roads in the province

== Geography ==
Facing the Sardinian Sea to the north and the Tyrrhenian Sea to the east, the province is bordered by the metropolitan city of Sassari to the west, and the province of Nuoro to the south. It has an area of 3,406.18 square kilometres (1,315.13 mi^{2}).

The province includes most of the historical region of Gallura, with the exception of Viddalba, located in the metropolitan city of Sassari, including the north-eastern coast of Sardinia. The province also includes the northern part of the historical region of Montacuto and a small part of Baronie.

== Government ==
The extraordinary administrator (mayor) of the province is Gaspare Piccinnu, appointed by resolution 36/2 of September 19, 2024 of the Autonomous Region of Sardinia.

=== Municipalities ===
The province has 26 municipalities:

Municipality	Native name	Population (2026)	Area (km²)	Density
Aggius	Àgghju	1,378	86.31	16.0
Aglientu	Santu Francìscu di l'Aglièntu	1,195	148.19	8.1
Alà dei Sardi	Alà	1,745	197.99	8.8
Arzachena	Alzachèna, Altzaghèna	13,456	230.85	58.3
Badesi	Badèsi	1,812	31.30	57.9
Berchidda	Belchìdda, Bilchìdda	2,604	201.88	12.9
Bortigiadas	Bultigghjàta	692	75.90	9.1
Buddusò	Buddusò	3,487	176.84	19.7
Budoni	Budùne, Budùni	5,685	54.28	104.7
Calangianus	Caragnàni, Calanzànos	3,692	126.84	29.1
Golfo Aranci	Fìgari	2,373	37.43	63.4
La Maddalena	A Madalèna, Sa Madalèna	10,449	52.01	200.9
Loiri Porto San Paolo	Lòiri Poltu Santu Pàulu	3,929	118.52	33.2
Luogosanto	Locusàntu, Logusàntu	1,838	135.07	13.6
Luras	Lùras, Lùrisi	2,369	87.59	27.0
Monti	Mònte	2,406	123.82	19.4
Olbia	Terranòa, Tarranòa	61,739	383.64	160.9
Oschiri	Óschiri, Óscari	2,885	215.61	13.4
Padru	Pàdru, Pàtru	2,130	158.00	13.5
Palau	Lu Palàu	4,058	44.44	91.3
San Teodoro	Santu Diadòru, Santu Tiadòru	5,224	107.60	48.6
Sant'Antonio di Gallura	Sant'Antòni de Calanzànos	1,432	81.69	17.5
Santa Teresa Gallura	Lungòni, Lungòne	5,144	102.29	50.3
Telti	Tèlti	2,281	83.25	27.4
Tempio Pausania	Tèmpiu	12,878	210.82	61.1
Trinità d'Agultu e Vignola	La Trinitài e Vignòla	2,579	134.00	19.2

== Demographics ==
As of 2026, the population is 159,460, of which 49.9% are male, and 50.1% are female. Minors make up 13.3% of the population, and seniors make up 24.3%.

Historical population

Year	Pop.	±%
1861	32,974	—
1871	34,122	+3.5%
1881	38,436	+12.6%
1901	54,345	+41.4%
1911	61,983	+14.1%
1921	66,609	+7.5%
1931	76,501	+14.9%
1936	78,530	+2.7%

Year	Pop.	±%
1951	90,197	+14.9%
1961	97,860	+8.5%
1971	102,758	+5.0%
1981	117,054	+13.9%
1991	131,734	+12.5%
2001	138,334	+5.0%
2011	150,501	+8.8%
2021	158,221	+5.1%

Source: ISTAT

=== Immigration ===
As of 2025, the foreign-born population is 15,803, making up 9.9% of the total population.
