= Aglientu =

Aglientu Santu Francìscu di l'Aglièntu (Gallurese)
- Comune
- Comune di Aglientu
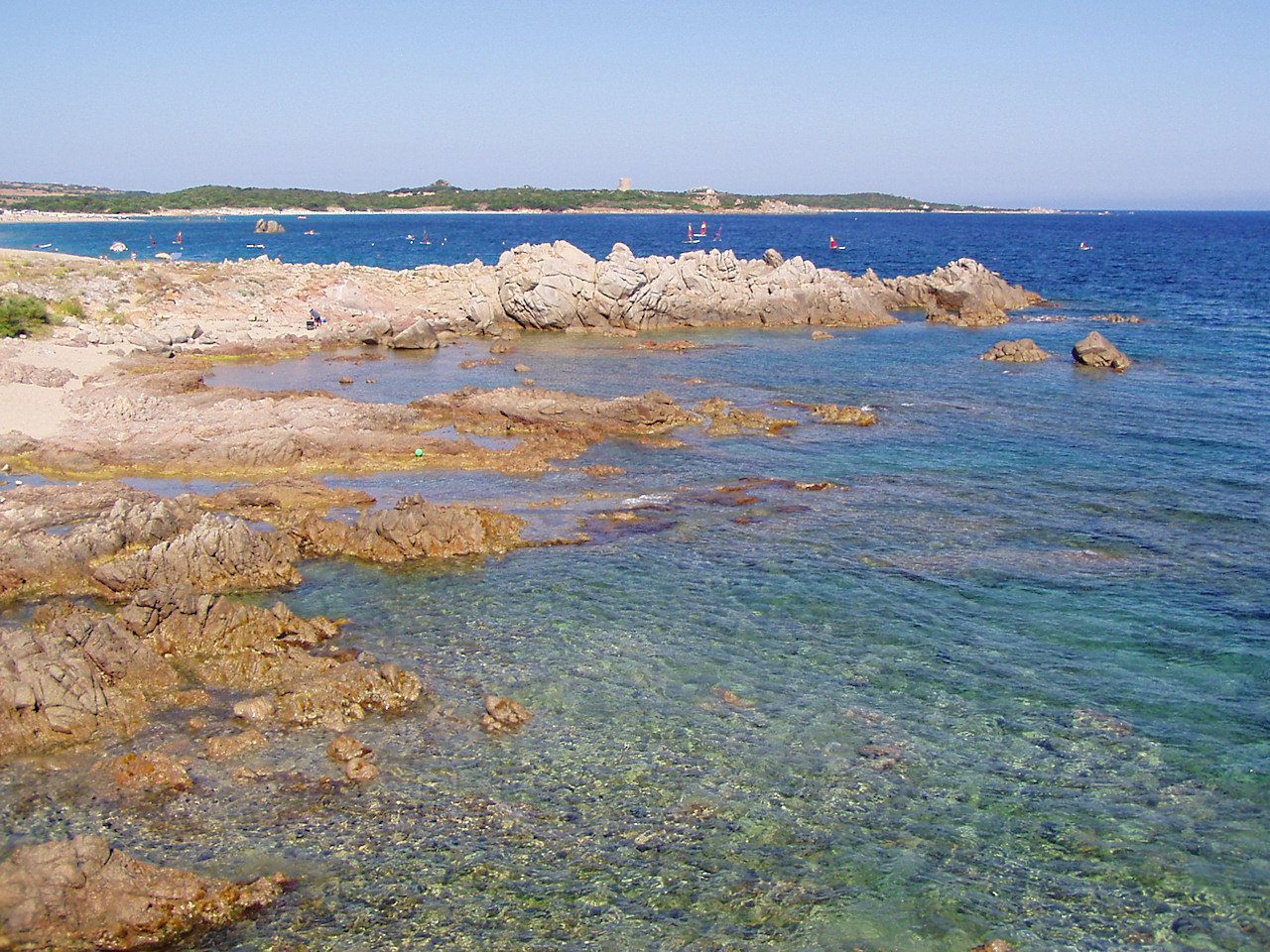
- Vignola Mare

- Location of Aglientu in Sardinia
- Coordinates: 41°5′N 9°7′E
- Country: Italy
- Region: Sardinia
- Province: Gallura North-East Sardinia

Government
  - Mayor: Antonio Tirotto

Area
  - Total: 148.19 km^{2} (57.22 sq mi)
- Elevation: 420 m (1,380 ft)

Population (2026)
  - Total: 1,195
  - Density: 8.064/km^{2} (20.89/sq mi)
- Demonym: Aglientesi
- Time zone: UTC+1 (CET)
  - Summer (DST): UTC+2 (CEST)
- Postal code: 07020
- Dialing code: 079
- Website: Official website

Aglientu (Gallurese: Santu Francìscu di l'Aglièntu) is a town and comune (municipality) in the Province of Gallura North-East Sardinia in the autonomous island region of Sardinia in Italy, located about 210 kilometres (130 mi) north of Cagliari and about 35 kilometres (22 mi) northwest of Olbia. It has 1,195 inhabitants.

Aglientu borders the municipalities of Aggius, Luogosanto, Santa Teresa Gallura, Tempio Pausania, and Trinità d'Agultu e Vignola.

In 2005 Aglientu hosted the Kitesurf World Cup. It is home to the Festa del Turista ("Tourist's Feast").

== Demographics ==
As of 2026, the population is 1,195, of which 50.4% are male, and 49.6% are female. Minors make up 11.5% of the population, and seniors make up 31.7%.

Historical population

Year	Pop.	±%
1861	657	—
1871	670	+2.0%
1881	764	+14.0%
1901	1,054	+38.0%
1911	1,324	+25.6%
1921	1,334	+0.8%
1931	1,330	−0.3%
1936	1,352	+1.7%

Year	Pop.	±%
1951	1,523	+12.6%
1961	1,471	−3.4%
1971	1,163	−20.9%
1981	1,086	−6.6%
1991	1,102	+1.5%
2001	1,093	−0.8%
2011	1,171	+7.1%
2021	1,168	−0.3%

Source: ISTAT

=== Immigration ===
As of 2025, immigrants make up 11.8% of the total population. The 5 largest foreign countries of birth are Romania, Germany, France, Switzerland, and Hungary.
