= Luras =

Luras: Lùras (Sardinian); Lùris (Gallurese)
- Comune
- Comune di Luras
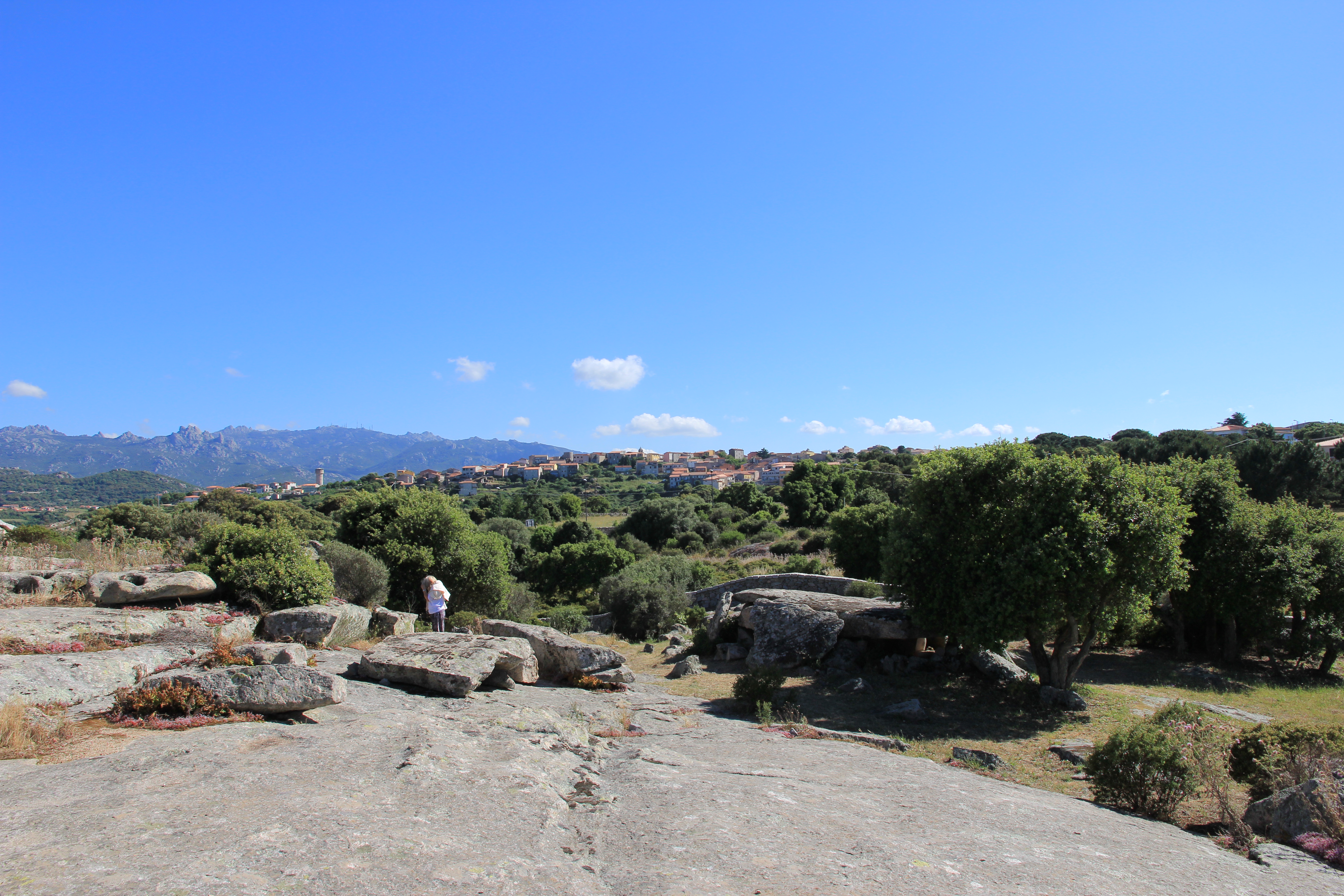
- View of Luras

- Location within Sardinia
- Coordinates: 40°56′N 9°11′E
- Country: Italy
- Region: Sardinia
- Province: Gallura North-East Sardinia

Government
  - Mayor: Maria Giuseppina Careddu

Area
  - Total: 87.59 km^{2} (33.82 sq mi)
- Elevation: 500 m (1,600 ft)

Population (2026)
  - Total: 2,369
  - Density: 27.05/km^{2} (70.05/sq mi)
- Demonym: Luresi
- Time zone: UTC+1 (CET)
  - Summer (DST): UTC+2 (CEST)
- Postal code: 07025
- Dialing code: 079
- Website: Official website

Luras (Sardinian: Lùras; Gallurese: Lùris) is a town and comune (municipality) in the Province of Gallura North-East Sardinia in the autonomous island region of Sardinia in Italy, located about 190 kilometres (120 mi) north of Cagliari and about 25 kilometres (16 mi) west of Olbia. It has 2,369 inhabitants.

Luras borders the municipalities of Arzachena, Calangianus, Luogosanto, Sant'Antonio di Gallura, and Tempio Pausania.

== Demographics ==
As of 2026, the population is 2,369, of which 48.8% are male, and 51.2% are female. Minors make up 13.6% of the population, and seniors make up 24.9%.

Historical population

Year	Pop.	±%
1861	1,835	—
1871	2,042	+11.3%
1881	2,242	+9.8%
1901	2,500	+11.5%
1911	2,794	+11.8%
1921	2,943	+5.3%
1931	2,934	−0.3%
1936	2,981	+1.6%

Year	Pop.	±%
1951	3,151	+5.7%
1961	3,051	−3.2%
1971	2,611	−14.4%
1981	2,701	+3.4%
1991	2,762	+2.3%
2001	2,660	−3.7%
2011	2,651	−0.3%
2021	2,429	−8.4%

Source: ISTAT

=== Immigration ===
As of 2025, immigrants make up 5.9% of the total population. The 5 largest foreign countries of birth are Romania, Morocco, Poland, France, and Brazil.

== Notable people ==
- Mavie Bardanzellu (born 1938), theater and film actress
- Roberto Diana (born 1983), musician, composer and producer
