= Monti, Sardinia =

Monti Monte (Sardinian) Mònti (Gallurese)
- Comune
- Comune di Monti
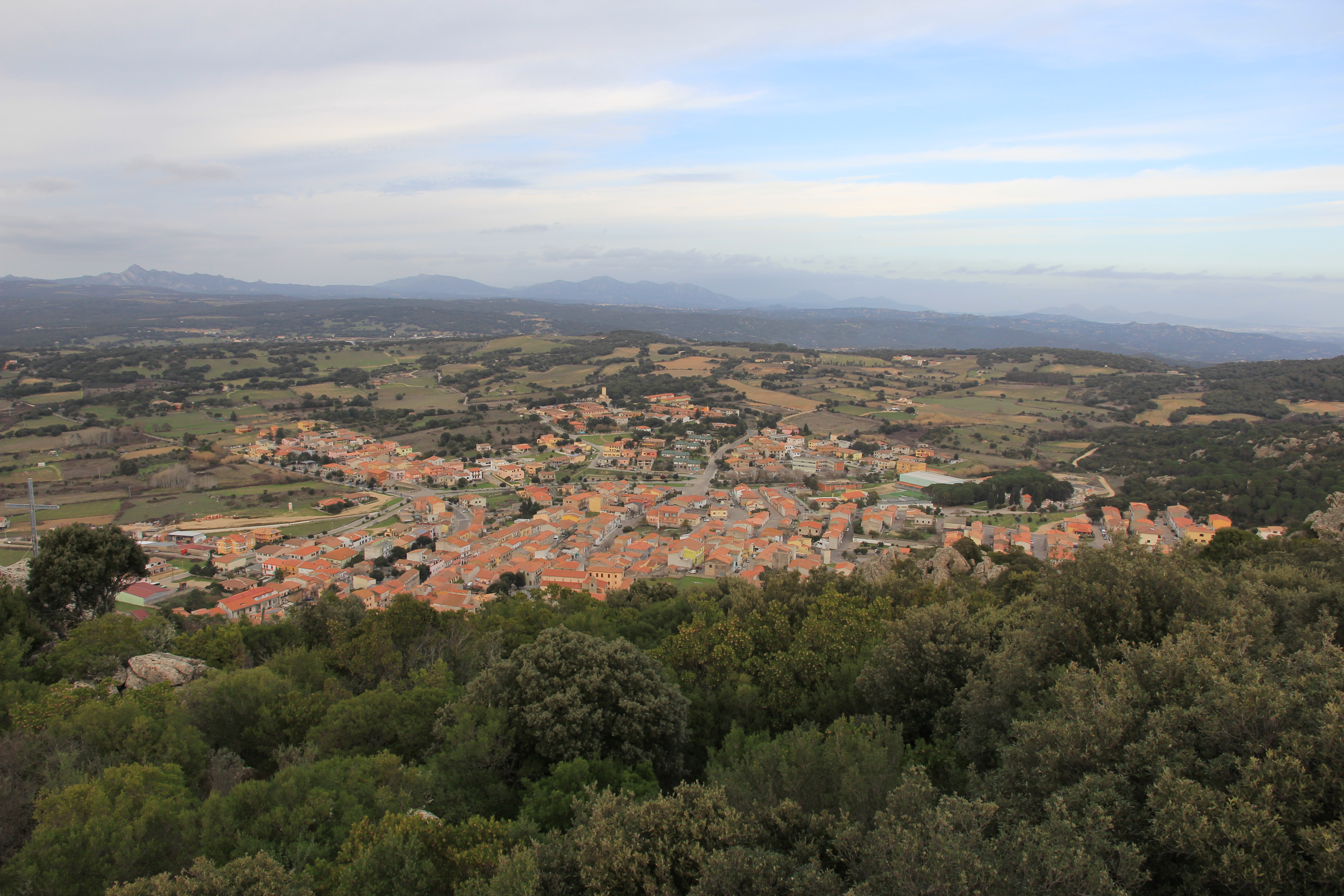
- View of Monti

- Location within Sardinia
- Coordinates: 40°48′N 9°20′E
- Country: Italy
- Region: Sardinia
- Province: Gallura North-East Sardinia
- Frazioni: Su Canale, Sos Rueddos, Chirialza

Government
  - Mayor: Giovanni Maria Raspitzu elected: 2005-05-10 party list: "Insieme per Monti"

Area
  - Total: 123.82 km^{2} (47.81 sq mi)
- Elevation: 300 m (980 ft)

Population (2026)
  - Total: 2,406
  - Density: 19.43/km^{2} (50.33/sq mi)
- Demonym: Montini
- Time zone: UTC+1 (CET)
  - Summer (DST): UTC+2 (CEST)
- Postal code: 07020
- Dialing code: 0789
- Website: Official website

Monti (Sardinian: Monte, Gallurese: Mònti) is a town and comune (municipality) in the Province of Gallura North-East Sardinia in the autonomous island region of Sardinia in Italy. It has 2,406 inhabitants.

The town is surrounded by the cork oak forests and vineyards which form the twin bases of its economy. The vermentino grape, once known as "arratelau", has been cultivated here since the 14th century. In 1996 its Vermentino di Gallura wine was awarded DOCG status.

Monti borders the municipalities of Alà dei Sardi, Berchidda, Calangianus, Loiri Porto San Paolo, Olbia, and Telti.

== Demographics ==
As of 2026, the population is 2,406, of which 49.8% are male, and 50.2% are female. Minors make up 14.4% of the population, and seniors make up 27.1%.

Historical population

Year	Pop.	±%
1861	853	—
1871	980	+14.9%
1881	1,184	+20.8%
1901	1,554	+31.2%
1911	1,986	+27.8%
1921	1,990	+0.2%
1931	2,197	+10.4%
1936	2,138	−2.7%

Year	Pop.	±%
1951	2,519	+17.8%
1961	2,432	−3.5%
1971	2,339	−3.8%
1981	2,547	+8.9%
1991	2,698	+5.9%
2001	2,440	−9.6%
2011	2,488	+2.0%
2021	2,348	−5.6%

Source: ISTAT

=== Immigration ===
As of 2025, immigrants make up 5.1% of the total population. The 5 largest foreign countries of birth are Romania, Germany, Bosnia and Herzegovina, France, and Morocco.

== Notable people ==
- Elvira Curci (1900–1984), actress known for The Case Against Mrs. Ames, Alcoa Presents: One Step Beyond, and Earthquake (1959)
