= Padru =

Padru Padru (Sardinian) Patru (Gallurese)
- Comune
- Comune di Padru
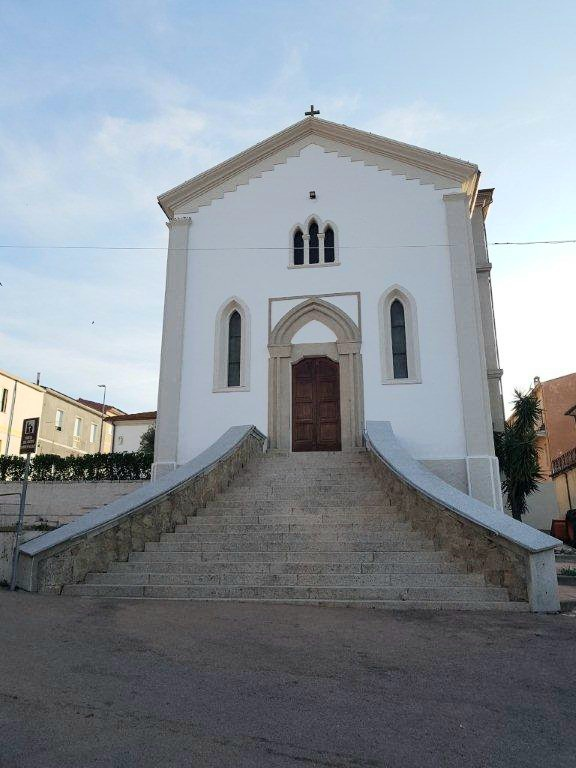
- Church of the Sacred Heart

- Location within Sardinia
- Coordinates: 40°46′N 9°31′E
- Country: Italy
- Region: Sardinia
- Province: Gallura North-East Sardinia
- Established: 3 January 1996
- Frazioni: Sozza, Cuzzola, Sa Serra, Pedra Bianca, Biasì, Tirialzu, Ludurru, Sos Runcos, Sas Enas

Area
  - Total: 158.00 km^{2} (61.00 sq mi)
- Elevation: 160 m (520 ft)

Population (2026)
  - Total: 2,130
  - Density: 13.5/km^{2} (34.9/sq mi)
- Demonym: Padresi
- Time zone: UTC+1 (CET)
  - Summer (DST): UTC+2 (CEST)
- Postal code: 07020
- Dialing code: 0789
- Website: Official website

Padru (Sardinian: Padru, Gallurese: Patru) is a town and comune (municipality) in the Province of Gallura North-East Sardinia in the autonomous island region of Sardinia in Italy, located about 180 kilometres (110 mi) north of Cagliari and about 15 kilometres (9 mi) south of Olbia. It has 2,130 inhabitants.

The municipality of Padru contains the frazioni (subdivisions, mainly villages and hamlets) Sozza, Cuzzola, Sa Serra, Pedra Bianca, Biasì, Tirialzu, Ludurru, Sos Runcos, and Sas Enas. It separated from the municipality of Buddusò in 1996.

Padru borders the municipalities of Alà dei Sardi, Loiri Porto San Paolo, Olbia, San Teodoro, Torpè, Lodè, and Bitti.

== Demographics ==
As of 2026, the population is 2,130, of which 50.4% are male, and 49.6% are female. Minors make up 13.6% of the population, and seniors make up 25.7%.

Historical population

| Year | Pop. | ±% |
|---|---|---|
| 1861 | - | — |
| 1871 | - | — |
| 1881 | - | — |
| 1901 | - | — |
| 1911 | - | — |
| 1921 | - | — |
| 1931 | - | — |
| 1936 | - | — |

| Year | Pop. | ±% |
|---|---|---|
| 1951 | 1,710 | — |
| 1961 | 2,009 | +17.5% |
| 1971 | 1,849 | −8.0% |
| 1981 | 2,028 | +9.7% |
| 1991 | 2,142 | +5.6% |
| 2001 | 2,109 | −1.5% |
| 2011 | 2,130 | +1.0% |
| 2021 | 2,055 | −3.5% |

Source: ISTAT

=== Immigration ===
As of 2025, immigrants make up 9.2% of the total population. The 5 largest foreign countries of birth are Romania, Germany, Morocco, Argentina, and Tunisia.
