= Oschiri =

Oschiri Óscheri (Sardinian) Óscari (Gallurese)
- Comune
- Comune di Oschiri
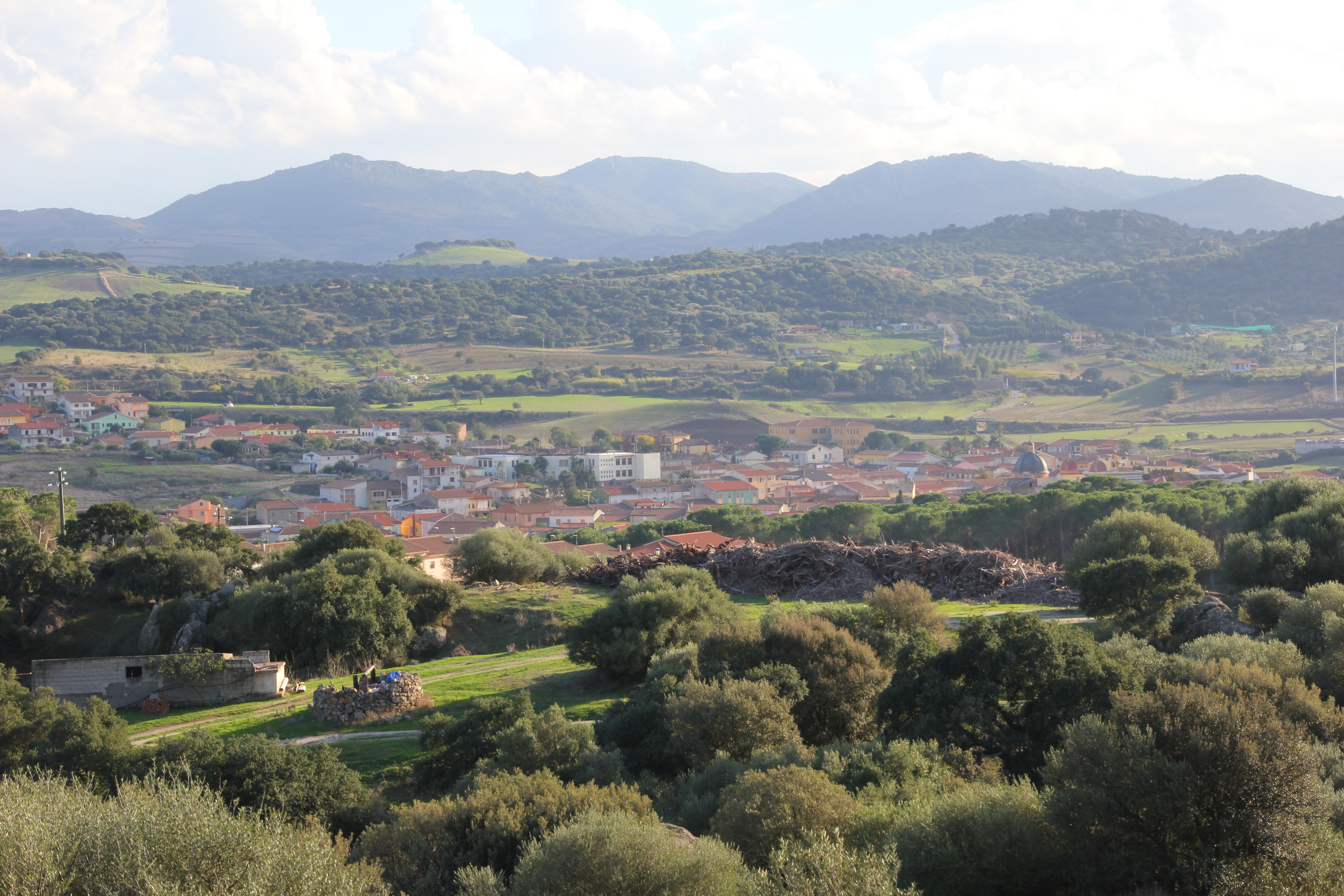
- Panorama from Santo Stefano

- Location within Sardinia
- Coordinates: 40°43′N 9°6′E
- Country: Italy
- Region: Sardinia
- Province: Gallura North-East Sardinia
- Frazioni: San Leonardo

Area
  - Total: 215.61 km^{2} (83.25 sq mi)

Population (2026)
  - Total: 2,885
  - Density: 13.38/km^{2} (34.66/sq mi)
- Demonym: Oschiresi
- Time zone: UTC+1 (CET)
  - Summer (DST): UTC+2 (CEST)
- Postal code: 07027
- Dialing code: 079

Oschiri (Sardinian: Óscheri, Gallurese: Óscari) is a town and comune (municipality) and former bishopric in the Province of Gallura North-East Sardinia in the autonomous island region of Sardinia in Italy, located about 170 kilometres (110 mi) north of Cagliari and about 40 kilometres (25 mi) southwest of Olbia. It has 2,885 inhabitants.

The municipality of Oschiri contains the frazione (subdivision) of San Leonardo.

Oschiri borders the municipalities of Alà dei Sardi, Berchidda, Buddusò, Ozieri, Pattada, Tempio Pausania, and Tula.

== Ecclesiastical history ==
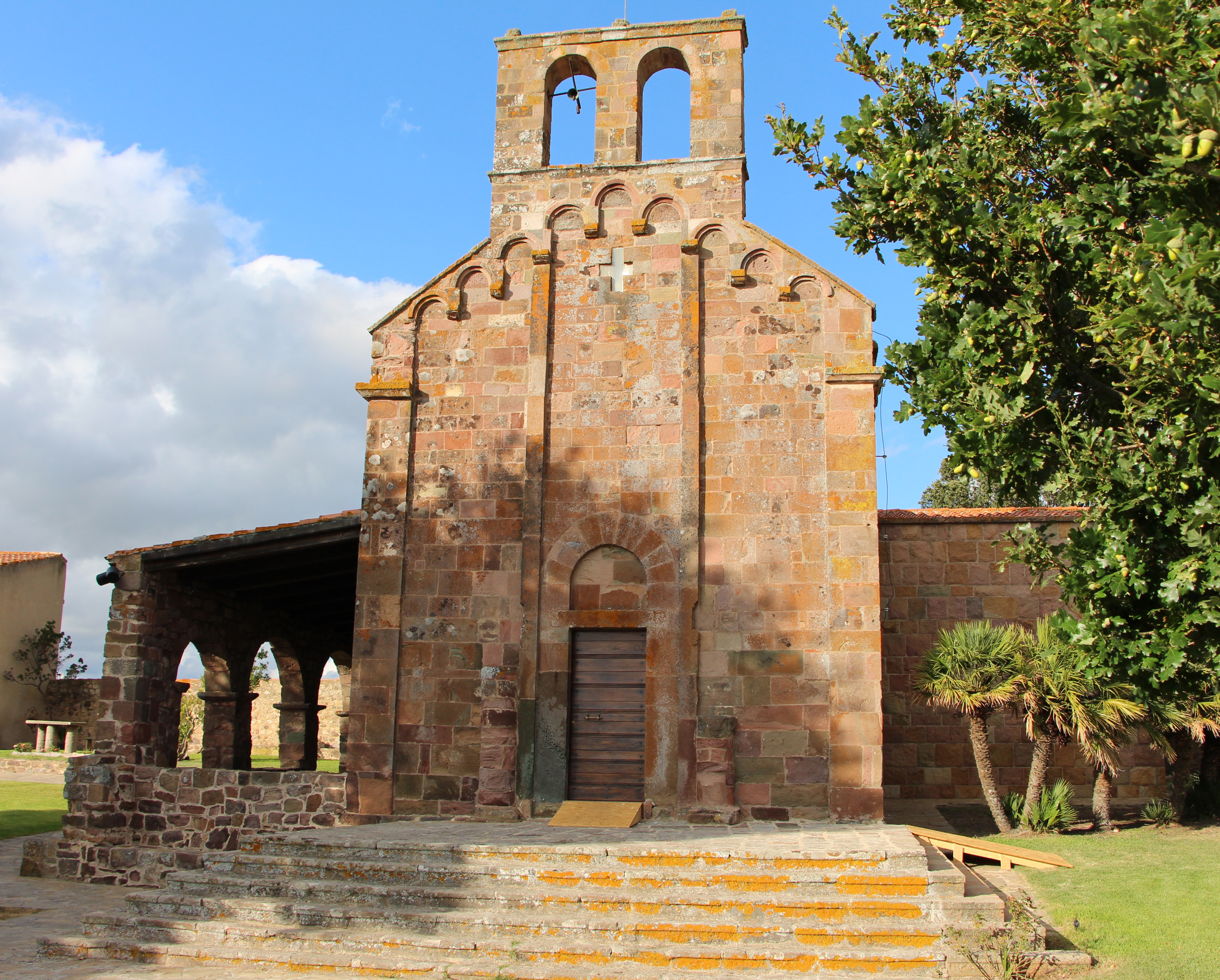
Our Lady of Castro

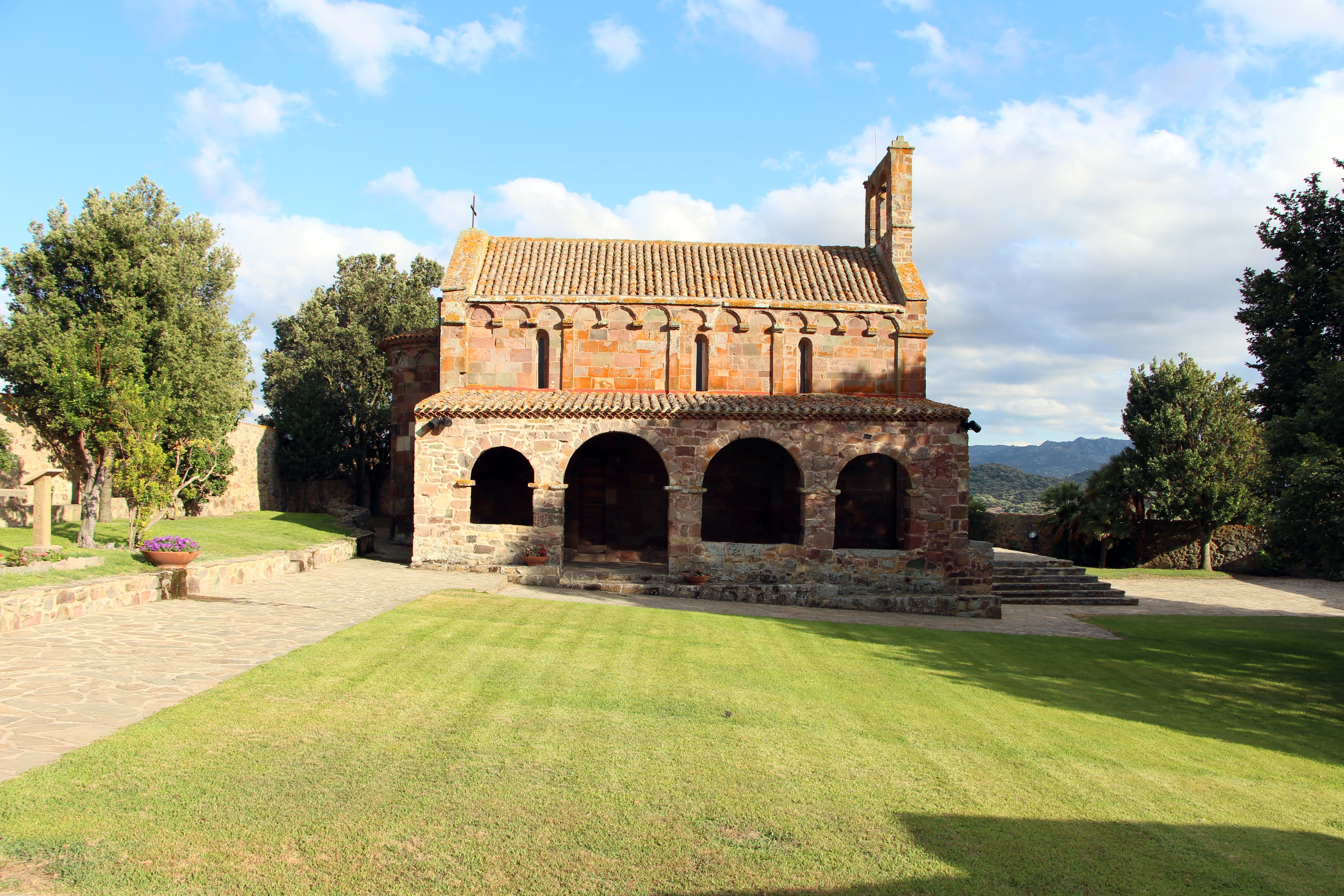
Our Lady of Castro

=== Bishopric of Castro (di Sardegna) ===
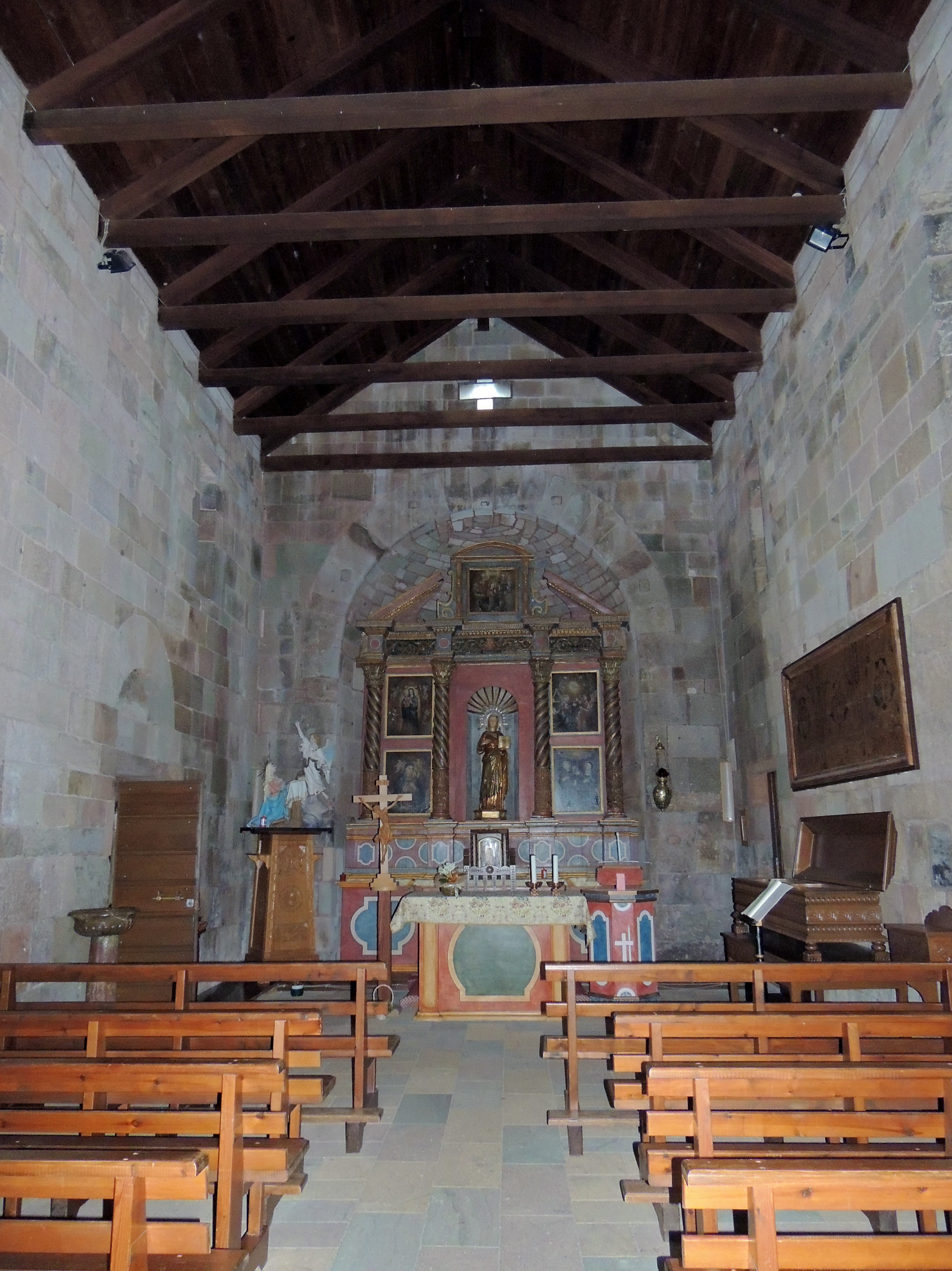
Our Lady of Castro - interior

Within the comune of Oschiri is the church of Nostra Signora di Castro, which was once the cathedral episcopal see of a diocese, centred on the now disappeared town of Castro. It was suffragan of the Metropolitan Archdiocese of Sassari.

The bishopric dates back to Byzantine times (circa 1000 AD), but the earliest mention of a bishop of Castro is of 1116, when an unnamed bishop of the see assisted at the dedication of the Basilica di Saccargia. In 1164, its bishop Atto dedicated a church in the locality of Aneleto and granted it in the following year to Camaldolese monks.

Castro later decayed, and the bishop's residence was transferred to Bono.

On 8 December 1503, the territory of Castro and that of two other dioceses were combined to form the new diocese of Alghero (now Alghero-Bosa). Today what was the territory of Castro is part of that of the diocese of Ozieri

=== Titular see ===
Castro itself, no longer a residential bishopric, is listed by the Catholic Church as a titular see since its nominal restoration as a Latin Catholic titular bishopric in 1968, initially simply as Castro, since 1976 as Castro di Sardegna, avoiding confusion with sees named Castro in Lazio and in Puglia.

It has had the following incumbents, both of the lowest (episcopal) and intermediary (archiepiscopal) ranks : Titular Archbishop Giuseppe Pittau, Jesuits (S.J.) (1998.07.11 – 2014.12.26) Titular Bishop Alfonso Sánchez Peña, Claretians (C.M.F.) (1969.07.28 – 1997.07.11) Titular Bishop (2015.07.15 – ...) Dominicus Meier, Benedictine Order (O.S.B.), Auxiliary Bishop of Paderborn (Germany)

== Demographics ==
As of 2026, the population is 2,885, of which 50.6% are male, and 49.4% are female. Minors make up 10.5% of the population, and seniors make up 32.7%.

Historical population

Year	Pop.	±%
1861	2,264	—
1871	2,401	+6.1%
1881	2,710	+12.9%
1901	2,904	+7.2%
1911	3,155	+8.6%
1921	3,134	−0.7%
1931	3,726	+18.9%
1936	4,016	+7.8%

Year	Pop.	±%
1951	4,669	+16.3%
1961	4,494	−3.7%
1971	4,102	−8.7%
1981	3,986	−2.8%
1991	3,900	−2.2%
2001	3,749	−3.9%
2011	3,436	−8.3%
2021	3,051	−11.2%

Source: ISTAT

=== Immigration ===
As of 2025, immigrants make up 4.4% of the total population. The 5 largest foreign countries of birth are Switzerland, Romania, France, Belgium, and Morocco.

== Sources and external links ==
- GigaCatholic, with titular incumbent biography links
