= Loiri Porto San Paolo =

Loiri Porto San Paolo Lòiri - Portu Santu Paulu (Sardinian) Lòiri-Poltu Santu Paulu (Gallurese)
- Comune
- Comune di Loiri Porto San Paolo
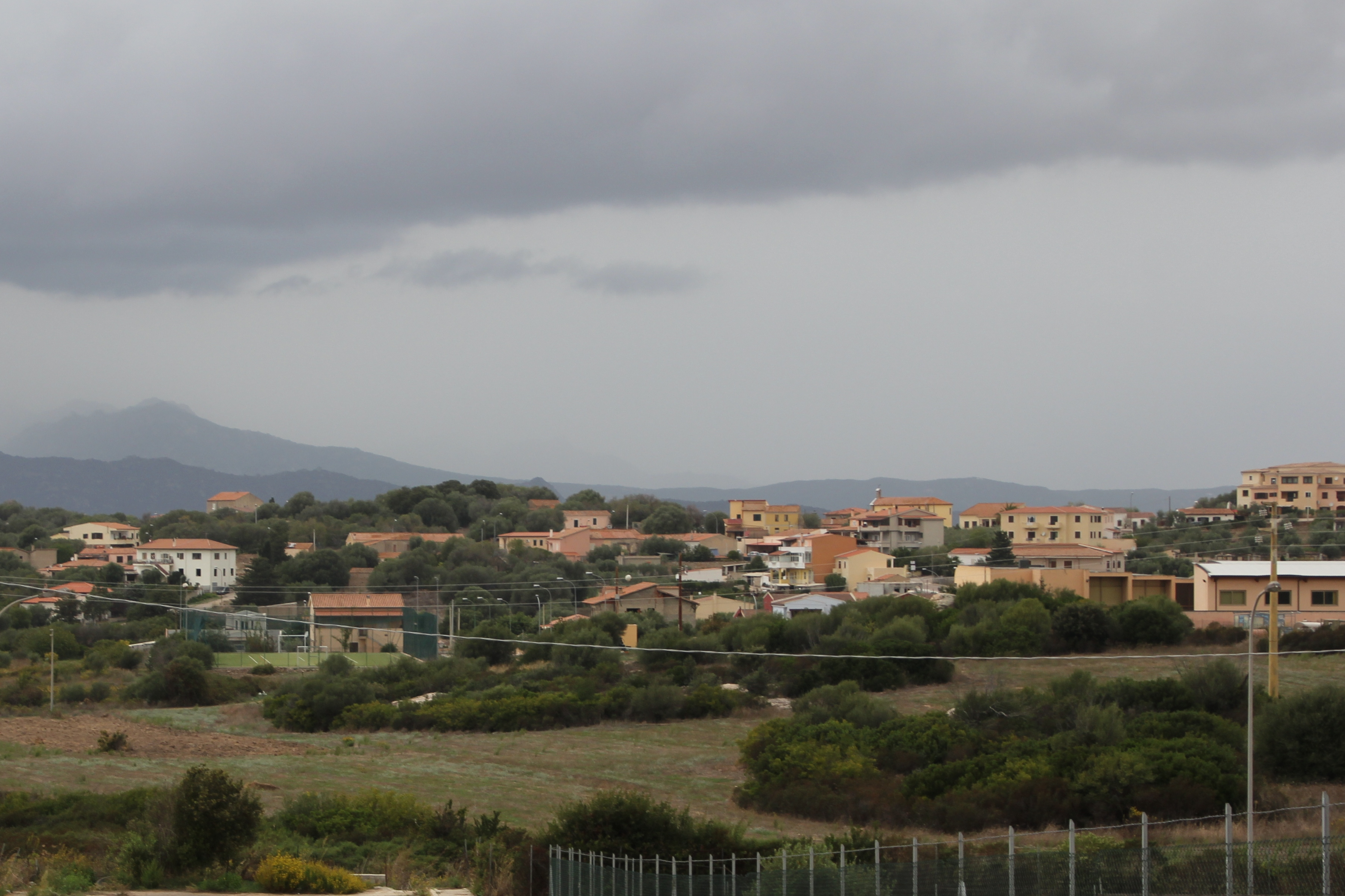
- View of Loiri Porto San Paolo

- Location within Sardinia
- Coordinates: 40°51′N 9°30′E
- Country: Italy
- Region: Sardinia
- Province: Gallura North-East Sardinia

Government
  - Mayor: Francesco Lai

Area
  - Total: 118.52 km^{2} (45.76 sq mi)
- Elevation: 105 m (344 ft)

Population (2026)
  - Total: 3,929
  - Density: 33.15/km^{2} (85.86/sq mi)
- Demonym: Loiresi
- Time zone: UTC+1 (CET)
  - Summer (DST): UTC+2 (CEST)
- Postal code: 07020
- Dialing code: 0789
- Website: Official website

Loiri Porto San Paolo (Sardinian: Lòiri - Portu Santu Paulu, Gallurese: Lòiri-Poltu Santu Paulu) is a town and comune (municipality) in the Province of Gallura North-East Sardinia in the autonomous island region of Sardinia in Italy, located about 180 kilometres (110 mi) north of Cagliari and about 7 kilometres (4 mi) south of Olbia. It has 3,929 inhabitants.

Loiri Porto San Paolo borders the municipalities of Monti, Olbia, Padru, and San Teodoro.

== Demographics ==
As of 2026, the population is 3,929, of which 50.7% are male, and 49.3% are female. Minors make up 14.2% of the population, and seniors make up 22.7%.

Historical population

Year	Pop.	±%
1861	595	—
1871	606	+1.8%
1881	692	+14.2%
1901	838	+21.1%
1911	847	+1.1%
1921	907	+7.1%
1931	1,037	+14.3%
1936	1,103	+6.4%

Year	Pop.	±%
1951	1,263	+14.5%
1961	1,415	+12.0%
1971	1,462	+3.3%
1981	1,849	+26.5%
1991	2,014	+8.9%
2001	2,214	+9.9%
2011	3,234	+46.1%
2021	3,659	+13.1%

Source: ISTAT

=== Immigration ===
As of 2025, immigrants make up 8.8% of the total population. The 5 largest foreign countries of birth are Romania, Germany, Switzerland,c Tunisia, and France.
