= Arzachena =

Town in Sardinia, Italy

Arzachena Altzaghèna (Sardinian) Alzachèna (Gallurese)
- Comune
- Comune di Arzachena
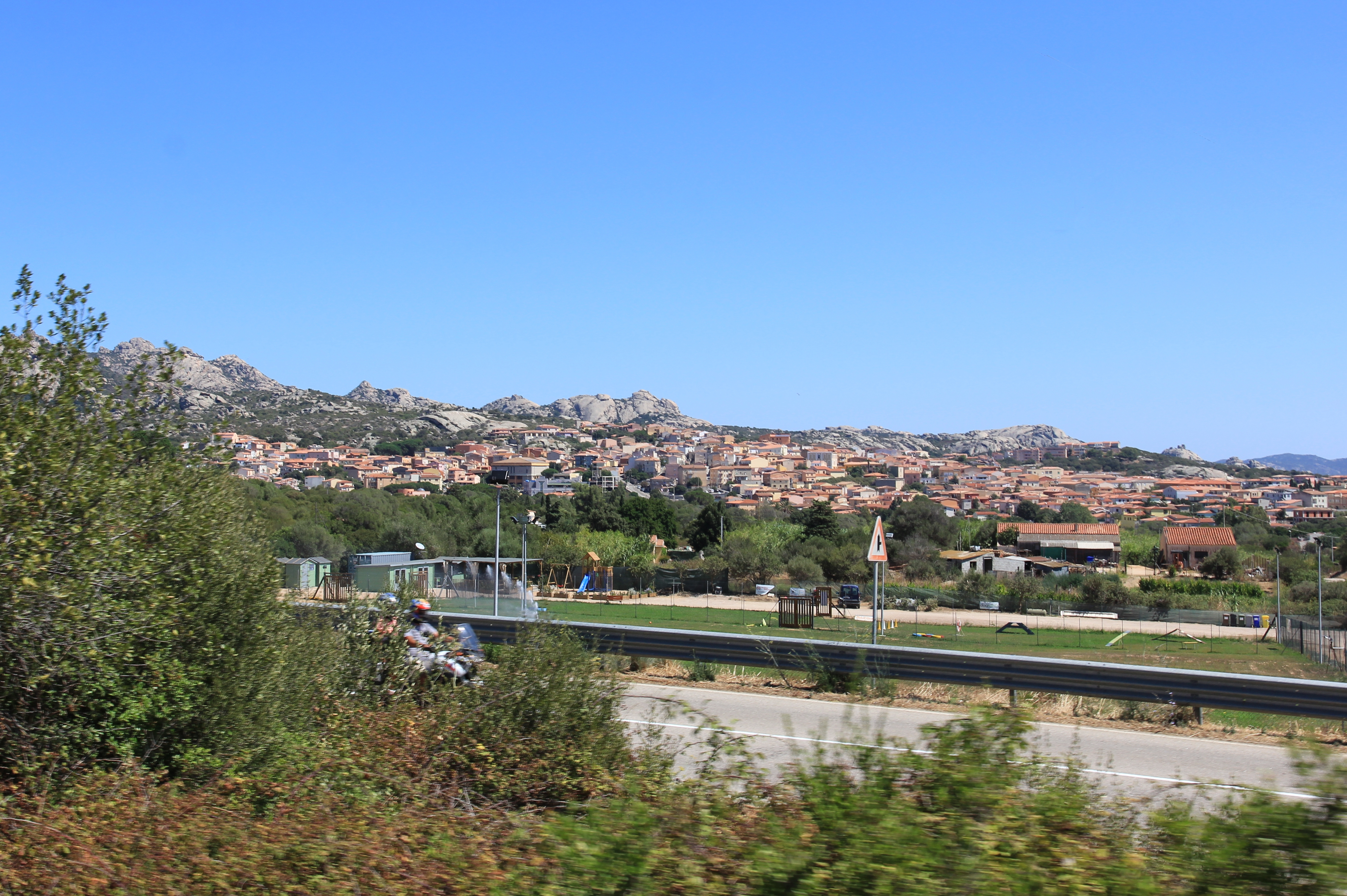
- View of Arzachena

- Flag Coat of arms

- Location within Sardinia
- Coordinates: 41°05′N 09°23′E
- Country: Italy
- Region: Sardinia
- Province: Gallura North-East Sardinia
- Frazioni: Abbiadori, Baja Sardinia, Cannigione, Porto Cervo, Cala di Volpe, Padula d'Izzana, Braniatogghiu, Cala Bitta, Cala del Faro, Capriccioli, Sarra Balestra, Calacrano, Cuncosu, Farina, Pulicinu, Golfo Pevero, Isuledda, Pitrizza, La Conia, Liscia di Vacca, Monticanaglia, Mucchi Bianchi, Lu Mulinu, Pantogia, La Caldosa, Capo Ferro, Poltu Quatu, Romazzino, Santa Teresina, Surrau, Tanca Manna

Government
  - Mayor: Roberto Ragnedda

Area
  - Total: 230.85 km^{2} (89.13 sq mi)
- Elevation: 85 m (279 ft)

Population (2026)
  - Total: 13,456
  - Density: 58.289/km^{2} (150.97/sq mi)
- Demonym: Arzachenesi
- Time zone: UTC+1 (CET)
  - Summer (DST): UTC+2 (CEST)
- Postal code: 07021
- Dialing code: 0789
- Patron saint: Santa Maria della Neve
- Saint day: 3rd Sunday in September
- Website: Official website

Arzachena (Italian pronunciation: [artsaˈkɛːna]; Sardinian: Altzaghèna, Gallurese: Alzachèna) is a town and comune (municipality) in the Province of Gallura North-East Sardinia in the northeastern part of the autonomous island region of Sardinia in Italy. Arzachena lies halfway between the original Costa Smeralda resort and Porto Rafael, both founded in the late 1950s. With a population of 13,456, it is the 2nd-largest municipality in Gallura by population after Olbia.

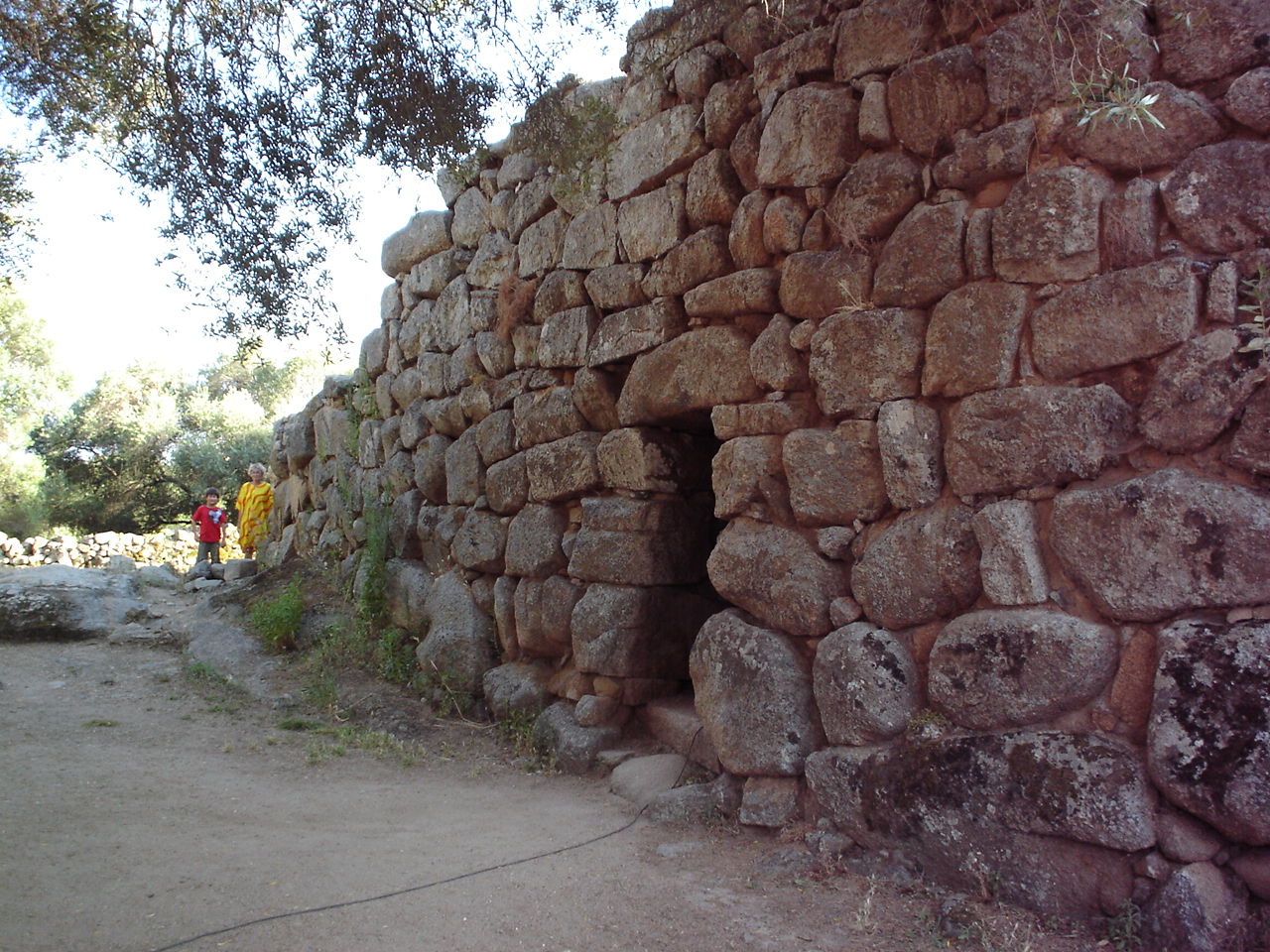
The Albucciu nuraghe near Arzachena.

The frazione of Porto Cervo is the main resort area of Costa Smeralda for summer tourism, which since the 1960s has replaced agriculture as the main local source of economic activity. Nearby there are numerous archaeological sites from the Nuragic period, including those from a local sub-culture known as Arzachena culture (the necropolis of Li Muri and others).

Arzachena borders the municipalities of Luogosanto, Luras, Olbia, Palau, Sant'Antonio di Gallura, and Tempio Pausania.

== History ==
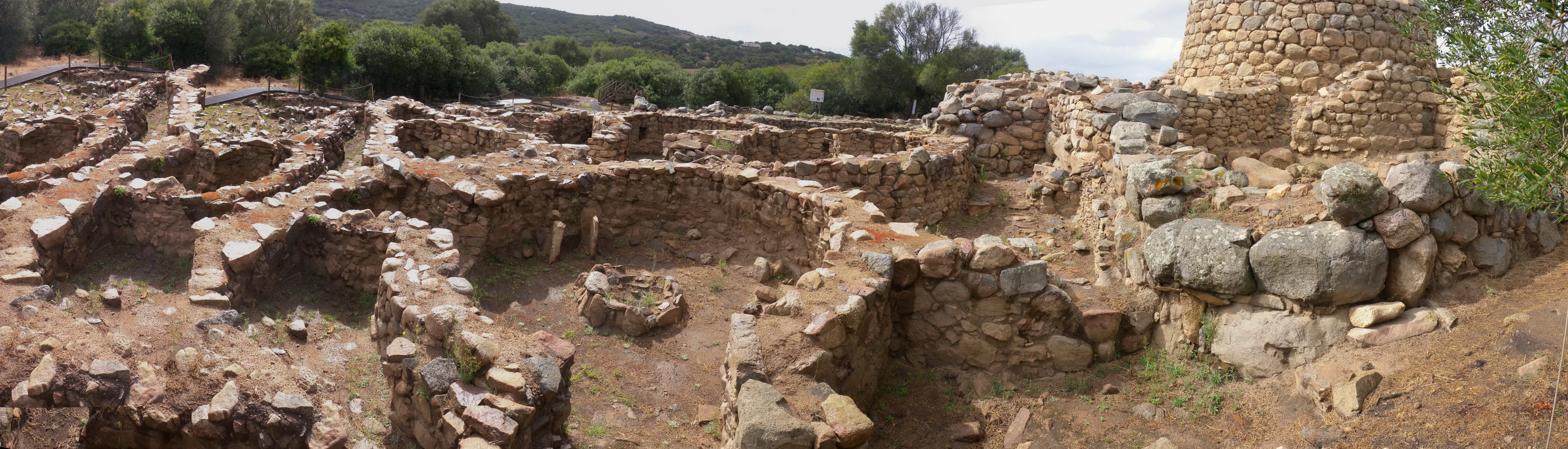
Nuraghe La Prisgiona

Located in an area once inhabited by the Arzachena culture, the region was known by the Romans as Turibulum, after a mushroom-shaped rock which is today the symbol of the town.

The oldest recorded use of the modern name is in a 1421 document, when king Alfonso IV of Aragon gave it (under the spelling Arsaghene) as a fief to Ramboldo de Cobaria. In the late 16th century, it was mostly depopulated, and the current town was re-established in 1716 on a hill by King Charles Emmanuel III of Savoy.

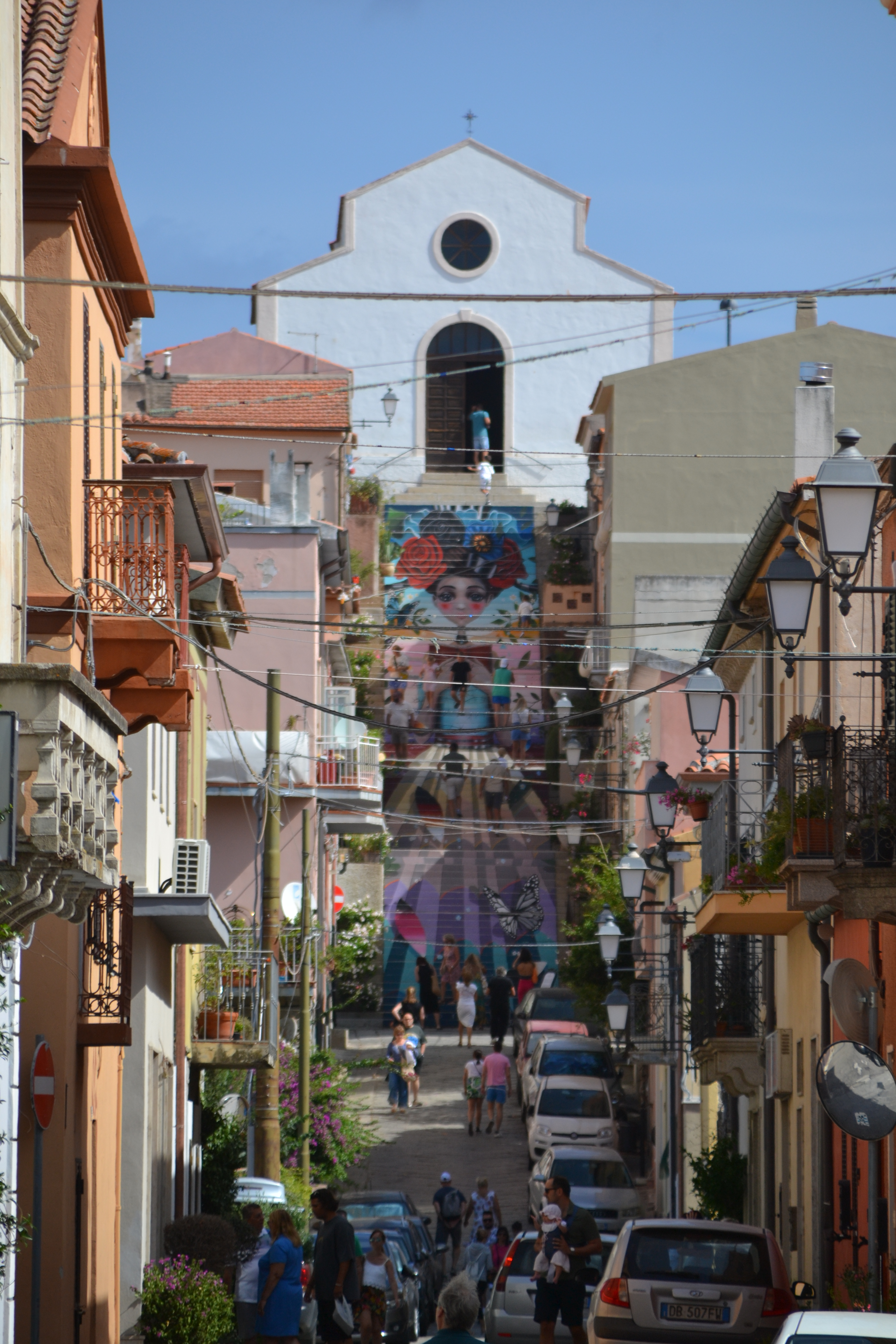
Santa Lucia church

In 1909 the new village had 853 inhabitants, a population which grew substantially after the tourist boom associated with Costa Smeralda, which had originally been a small stretch of coast in the commune of Arzachena.

== Frazioni ==
- Abbiadori
- Baja Sardinia
- Cala di Volpe
- Cannigione
- Poltu Quatu
- Porto Cervo
- La Conia
- Liscia di Vacca
- Santa Teresina
- Monti Canaglia
- Padula d'Izzana
- Giunnicheddu

== Demographics ==
As of 2026, the population is 13,456, of which 50.5% are male, and 49.5% are female. Minors make up 13.4% of the population, and seniors make up 24.2%.

Historical population

Year	Pop.	±%
1861	1,339	—
1871	1,379	+3.0%
1881	1,569	+13.8%
1901	2,568	+63.7%
1911	2,833	+10.3%
1921	3,160	+11.5%
1931	3,749	+18.6%
1936	3,782	+0.9%

Year	Pop.	±%
1951	4,269	+12.9%
1961	4,618	+8.2%
1971	6,157	+33.3%
1981	7,998	+29.9%
1991	9,435	+18.0%
2001	10,730	+13.7%
2011	11,447	+6.7%
2021	13,328	+16.4%

Source: ISTAT

=== Immigration ===
As of 2025, immigrants make up 12.0% of the total population. The 5 largest foreign countries of birth are Romania, Morocco, Brazil, Germany, and France.

== International relations ==
=== Twin towns - sister cities ===
- Porto-Vecchio, France
- Ibiza, Spain
- Sharm el-Sheikh, Egypt

== See also ==
- Capo Ferro Lighthouse
