= Golfo Aranci =

Golfo Aranci Figari (Sardinian) Figari (Gallurese)
- Comune
- Comune di Golfo Aranci
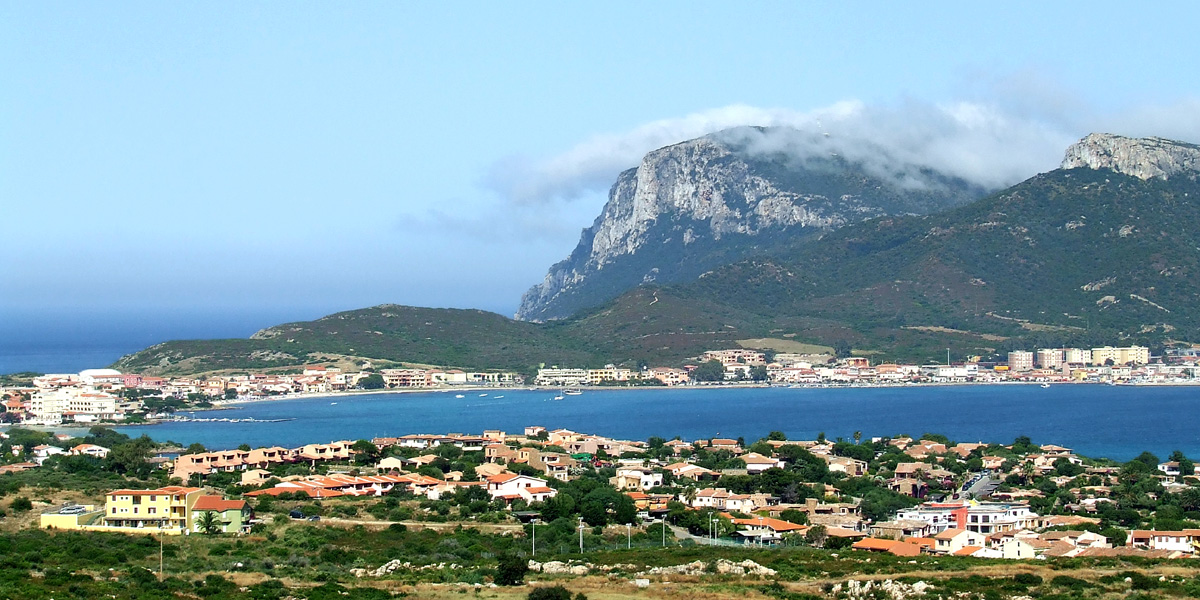
- View of Golfo Aranci

- Location within Sardinia
- Coordinates: 41°0′N 9°37′E
- Country: Italy
- Region: Sardinia
- Province: Gallura North-East Sardinia
- Frazioni: Bados, Marinella, Nodu Pianu, Rudalza

Government
  - Mayor: Giuseppe Fasolino

Area
  - Total: 37.43 km^{2} (14.45 sq mi)
- Elevation: 19 m (62 ft)

Population (2026)
  - Total: 2,373
  - Density: 63.40/km^{2} (164.2/sq mi)
- Demonym: Golfarancini
- Time zone: UTC+1 (CET)
  - Summer (DST): UTC+2 (CEST)
- Postal code: 07020
- Dialing code: 0789
- Website: Official website

Golfo Aranci (Sardinian and Gallurese: Figari) is a town and comune (municipality) in the Province of Gallura North-East Sardinia in the autonomous island region of Sardinia in Italy, located about 200 kilometres (120 mi) north of Cagliari and about 13 kilometres (8 mi) northeast of Olbia. It has 2,373 inhabitants.

== Etymology ==
The town's name, literally "Gulf [of the] Oranges", actually derives from a recent Italianization of the Gallurese toponym Golfu di li Ranci ("Gulf of the Crabs"). It was previously known only as Figari.

== History ==
The current town grew up in the mid-18th century as a fishing port. In the early 19th century a Royal Decree made it into the main port for the arrivals from the Italian mainland, contributing to its population growth.

== Demographics ==
As of 2026, the population is 2,373, of which 48.5% are male, and 51.5% are female. Minors make up 10.2% of the population, and seniors make up 28.1%.

Historical population

Year	Pop.	±%
1861	173	—
1871	192	+11.0%
1881	231	+20.3%
1901	311	+34.6%
1911	404	+29.9%
1921	456	+12.9%
1931	616	+35.1%
1936	645	+4.7%

Year	Pop.	±%
1951	836	+29.6%
1961	1,009	+20.7%
1971	1,378	+36.6%
1981	1,822	+32.2%
1991	1,942	+6.6%
2001	1,961	+1.0%
2011	2,288	+16.7%
2021	2,376	+3.8%

Source: ISTAT

=== Immigration ===
As of 2025, immigrants make up 7.3% of the total population. The 5 largest foreign countries of birth are Romania, Ukraine, Switzerland, Russia, and Germany.
