= Budoni =

Budoni Budùne (Sardinian) Budùni (Gallurese)
- Comune
- Comune di Budoni
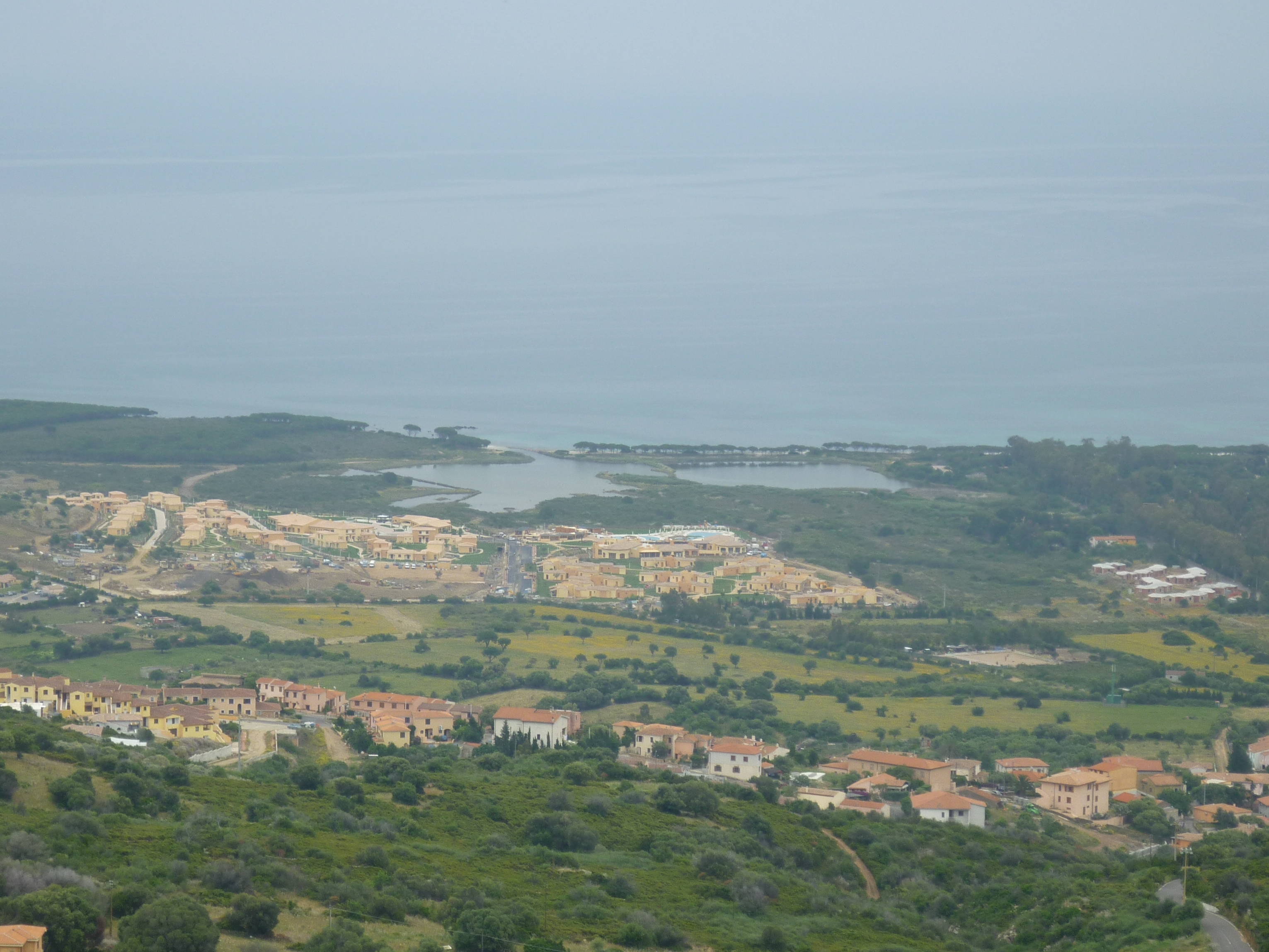
- View of Budoni

- Location within Sardinia
- Coordinates: 40°42′N 9°42′E
- Country: Italy
- Region: Sardinia
- Province: Gallura North-East Sardinia
- Frazioni: Agrustos (Gall.), Berruiles (Gall.), Birgalavò (Gall.), Limpiddu (Log.), Li Troni (Gall.), Ludduì (Gall.), Lu Linnalvu (Gall.), Luttuni (Gall.), Lutturai (Gall.), Maiorca (Gall.), Malamurì (Gall.), Muriscuvò (Log.), Nuditta (Gall.), Ottiolu (Gall.), San Gavino (Log.), San Lorenzo (Log.), San Pietro (Gall.), San Silvestro (Gall.), S'Iscala (Log.), Solità (Log.), Strugas (Gall.), Tanaunella (Log.), Tamarispa (Log.)

Government
  - Mayor: Giuseppe Porcheddu

Area
  - Total: 54.28 km^{2} (20.96 sq mi)
- Elevation: 16 m (52 ft)

Population (2026)
  - Total: 5,685
  - Density: 104.7/km^{2} (271.3/sq mi)
- Demonym: Budonesi
- Time zone: UTC+1 (CET)
  - Summer (DST): UTC+2 (CEST)
- Postal code: 07051
- Dialing code: 0784
- Patron saint: S. Giovanni Battista
- Saint day: August 29
- Website: Official website

Budoni (Sardinian: Budùne, Gallurese: Budùni) is a town and comune (municipality) in the Province of Gallura North-East Sardinia in the autonomous island region of Sardinia in Italy, located about 170 kilometres (110 mi) northeast of Cagliari and about 30 kilometres (19 mi) southeast of Olbia. It has 5,685 inhabitants.

Budoni borders the municipalities of Posada, San Teodoro, and Torpè.

== Frazioni ==
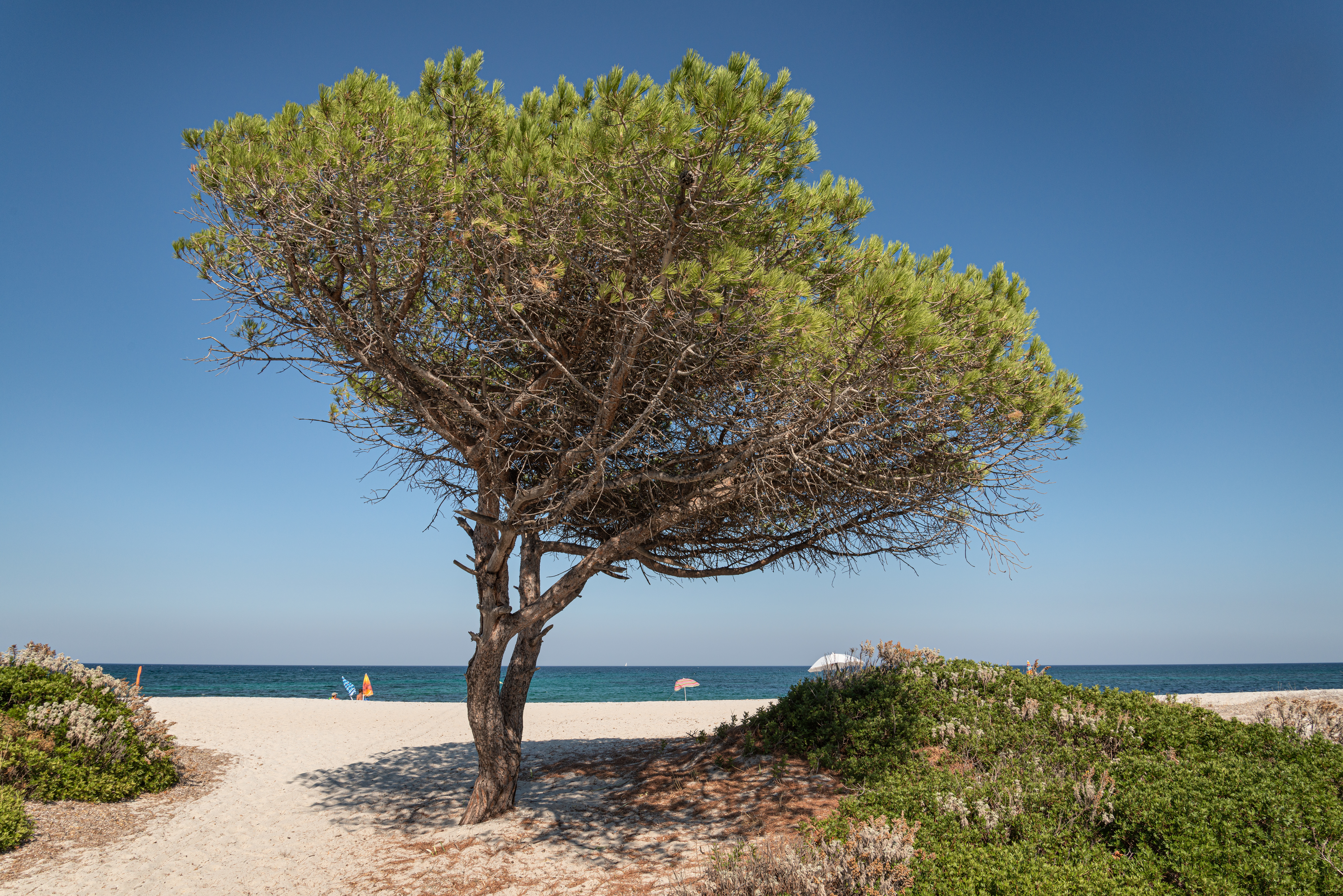
Li Cucutti beach

The municipality of Budoni contains the frazioni (subdivisions, mainly villages and hamlets):

- Agrustos (Gall.)
- Berruiles (Gall.)
- Birgalavò (Gall.)
- Limpiddu (Log.)
- Li Troni (Gall.)
- Ludduì (Gall.)
- Lu Linnalvu (Gall.)
- Luttuni (Gall.)
- Lutturai (Gall.)
- Maiorca (Gall.)
- Malamurì (Gall.)
- Muriscuvò (Log.)
- Nuditta (Gall.)
- Ottiolu (Gall.)
- San Gavino (Log.)
- San Lorenzo (Log.)
- San Pietro (Gall.)
- San Silvestro (Gall.)
- S'Iscala (Log.)
- Solità (Log.)
- Strugas (Gall.)
- Tanaunella (Log.)
- Tamarispa (Log.)

== Demographics ==
As of 2026, the population is 5,685, of which 50.0% are male, and 50.0% are female. Minors make up 12.2% of the population, and seniors make up 24.0%.

Historical population

Year	Pop.	±%
1861	677	—
1871	629	−7.1%
1881	730	+16.1%
1901	1,055	+44.5%
1911	1,243	+17.8%
1921	1,305	+5.0%
1931	1,429	+9.5%
1936	1,634	+14.3%

Year	Pop.	±%
1951	2,037	+24.7%
1961	2,421	+18.9%
1971	2,646	+9.3%
1981	3,111	+17.6%
1991	3,650	+17.3%
2001	3,929	+7.6%
2011	4,846	+23.3%
2021	5,333	+10.0%

Source: ISTAT

=== Immigration ===
As of 2025, immigrants make up 11.0% of the total population. The 5 largest foreign countries of birth are Morocco, Romania, Germany, France, and Albania.
