= San Teodoro, Sardinia =

San Teodoro Santu Tiadòru (Sardinian) Santu Diadòru (Gallurese)
- Comune
- Comune di San Teodoro
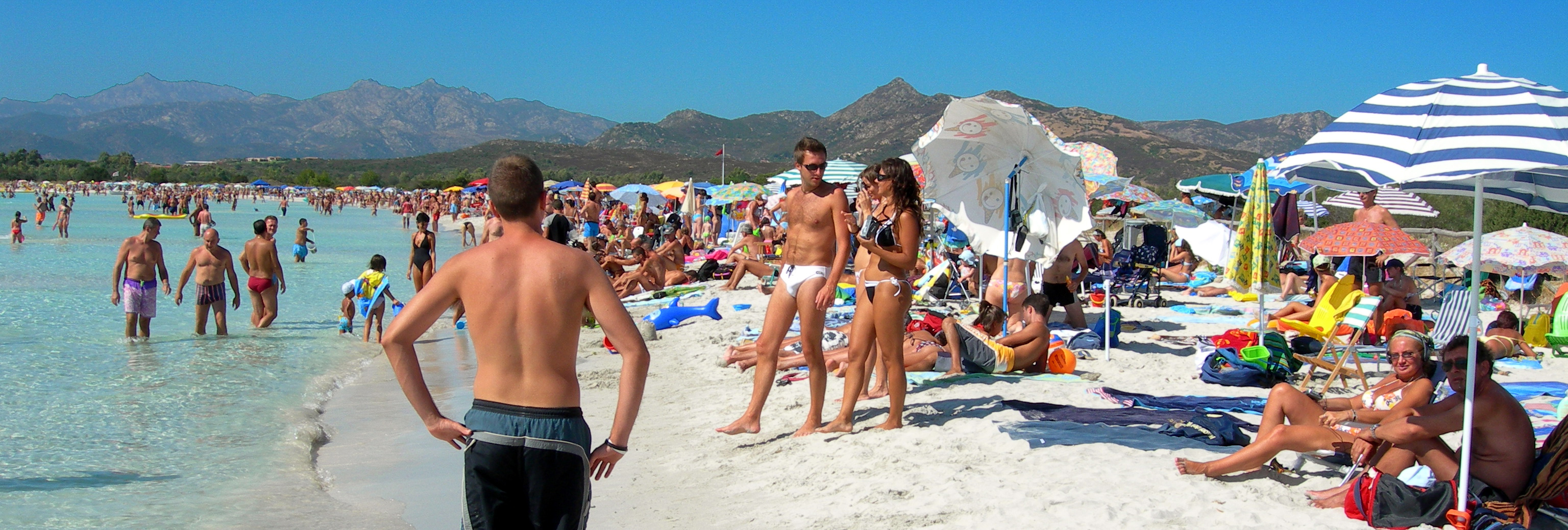
- Cala Brandinchi beach

- Location within Sardinia
- Coordinates: 40°46′N 9°40′E
- Country: Italy
- Region: Sardinia
- Province: Gallura North-East Sardinia
- Frazioni: La Suarédda, Monti Pitrosu, Stràula, Budditogliu, La Traversa, Lu Fraili, Lu Sitagliacciu, Lu Lioni, L'Alzoni, Lu Ricciu, Narachéddu, Tiridduli, Schiffoni, Franculacciu, Stazzu Brusgiatu

Area
  - Total: 107.60 km^{2} (41.54 sq mi)

Population (2026)
  - Total: 5,224
  - Density: 48.55/km^{2} (125.7/sq mi)
- Demonym: Teodorini
- Time zone: UTC+1 (CET)
  - Summer (DST): UTC+2 (CEST)
- Postal code: 08020 or 07052
- Dialing code: 0784
- Website: Official website

San Teodoro (Sardinian: Santu Tiadòru, Gallurese: Santu Diadòru) is a town and comune (municipality) in the Province of Gallura North-East Sardinia in the autonomous island region of Sardinia in Italy, located about 180 kilometres (110 mi) northeast of Cagliari and about 20 kilometres (12 mi) southeast of Olbia. It has 5,224 inhabitants.

The municipality of San Teodoro contains several frazioni (subdivisions, mainly villages and hamlets), among which: La Suarédda, Monti Pitrosu, Straula, Budditogliu, La Traversa, Lu Fraili, and Lu Sitagliacciu.

San Teodoro borders the municipalities of Budoni, Loiri Porto San Paolo, Padru, and Torpè.

The beach of "La Cinta" was home of the kite boarding festival in September 2010.

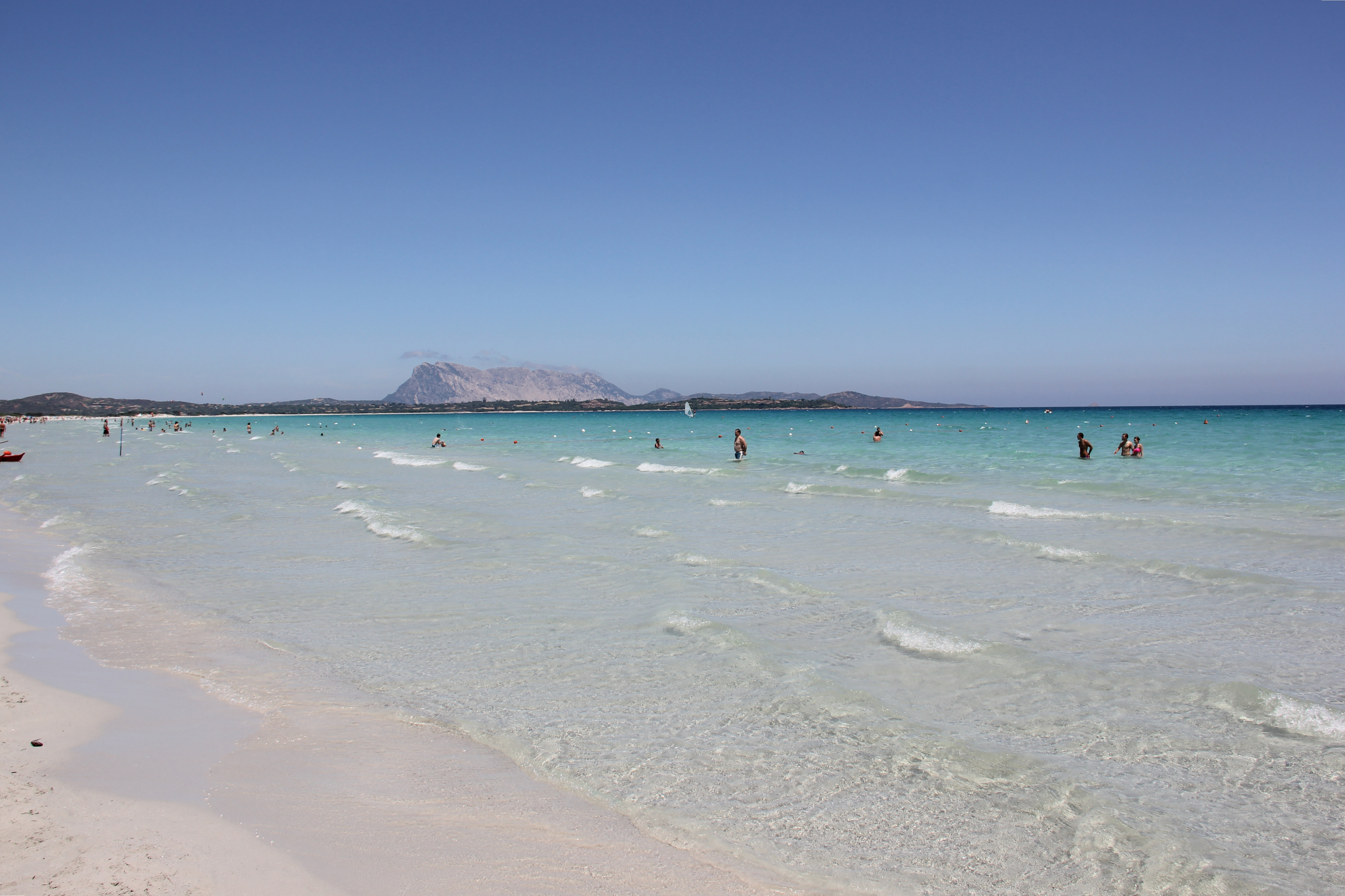
La Cinta beach

The beach of "Lu Impostu" is also known as Little Tahiti due to the beautiful colours of the sea.

== Demographics ==
As of 2026, the population is 5,224, of which 50.9% are male, and 49.1% are female. Minors make up 11.6% of the population, and seniors make up 24.4%.

Historical population

Year	Pop.	±%
1861	529	—
1871	491	−7.2%
1881	571	+16.3%
1901	824	+44.3%
1911	972	+18.0%
1921	1,020	+4.9%
1931	1,117	+9.5%
1936	1,277	+14.3%

Year	Pop.	±%
1951	1,592	+24.7%
1961	1,707	+7.2%
1971	1,615	−5.4%
1981	2,028	+25.6%
1991	2,507	+23.6%
2001	3,103	+23.8%
2011	4,540	+46.3%
2021	4,992	+10.0%

Source: ISTAT

=== Immigration ===
As of 2025, immigrants make up 12.6% of the total population. The 5 largest foreign countries of birth are Romania, Germany, Morocco, Switzerland, and France.
