= Luogosanto =

Luogosanto Logusantu (Sardinian) Locusantu (Gallurese)
- Comune
- Comune di Luogosanto
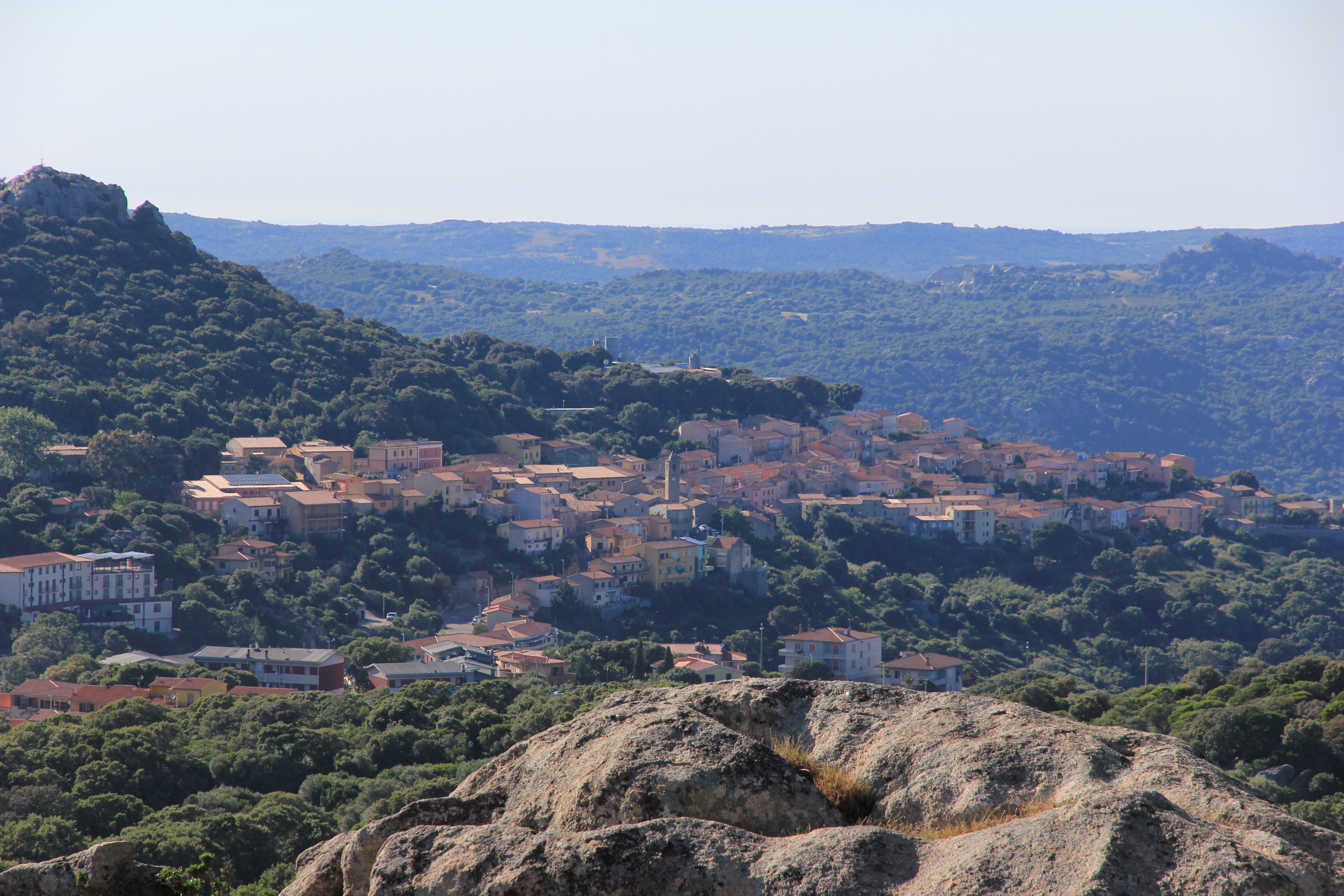
- View of Luogosanto

- Location within Sardinia
- Coordinates: 41°3′N 9°12′E
- Country: Italy
- Region: Sardinia
- Province: Gallura North-East Sardinia

Government
  - Mayor: Agostino Piredda

Area
  - Total: 135.07 km^{2} (52.15 sq mi)
- Elevation: 321 m (1,053 ft)

Population (2026)
  - Total: 1,838
  - Density: 13.61/km^{2} (35.24/sq mi)
- Demonym: Luogosantesi
- Time zone: UTC+1 (CET)
  - Summer (DST): UTC+2 (CEST)
- Postal code: 07020
- Dialing code: 079

Luogosanto (Sardinian: Logusantu, Gallurese: Locusantu) is a town and comune (municipality) in the Province of Gallura North-East Sardinia in the autonomous island region of Sardinia in Italy, located about 200 kilometres (120 mi) north of Cagliari and about 30 kilometres (19 mi) northwest of Olbia. It has 1,838 inhabitants.

Luogosanto borders the municipalities of Aglientu, Arzachena, Luras, Tempio Pausania.

== Demographics ==
As of 2026, the population is 1,838, of which 51.1% are male, and 48.9% are female. Minors make up 13.6% of the population, and seniors make up 27.0%.

Historical population

Year	Pop.	±%
1861	1,141	—
1871	1,163	+1.9%
1881	1,327	+14.1%
1901	1,754	+32.2%
1911	2,319	+32.2%
1921	2,222	−4.2%
1931	2,365	+6.4%
1936	2,457	+3.9%

Year	Pop.	±%
1951	2,742	+11.6%
1961	2,612	−4.7%
1971	2,029	−22.3%
1981	1,972	−2.8%
1991	1,875	−4.9%
2001	1,825	−2.7%
2011	1,905	+4.4%
2021	1,818	−4.6%

Source: ISTAT

=== Immigration ===
As of 2025, immigrants make up 7.9% of the total population. The 5 largest foreign countries of birth are Romania, Germany, Morocco, Senegal, and Argentina.
