= Santa Teresa Gallura =

Santa Teresa di Gallura Lungone (Sardinian) Lungoni (Gallurese)
- Comune
- Comune di Santa Teresa Gallura
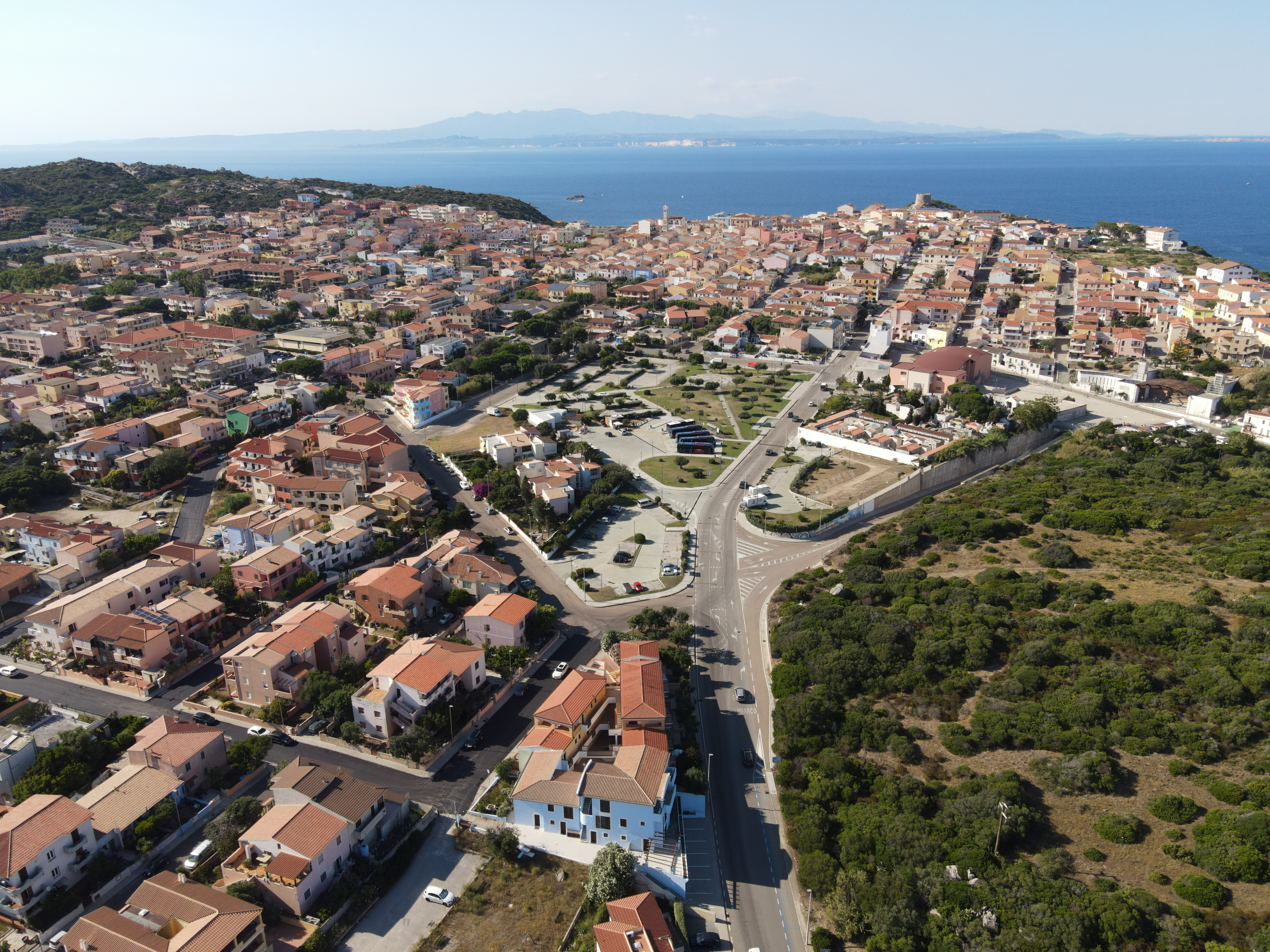
- View of Santa Teresa Gallura and the southern coast of Corsica

- Location within Sardinia
- Coordinates: 41°15′N 9°11′E
- Country: Italy
- Region: Sardinia
- Province: Gallura North-East Sardinia

Government
  - Mayor: Stefano Ilario Pisciottu

Area
  - Total: 102.29 km^{2} (39.49 sq mi)
- Elevation: 40 m (130 ft)

Population (2026)
  - Total: 5,144
  - Density: 50.29/km^{2} (130.2/sq mi)
- Demonym: Lungunesi
- Time zone: UTC+1 (CET)
  - Summer (DST): UTC+2 (CEST)
- Postal code: 07028
- Dialing code: 0789
- Patron saint: Santa Teresa
- Website: Official website

Santa Teresa Gallura (Sardinian: Lungone, Gallurese: Lungoni) is a town and comune (municipality) in the Province of Gallura North-East Sardinia on the northern tip of the autonomous island region of Sardinia in Italy. The southern coast of the French island of Corsica can be seen from the beach on the Strait of Bonifacio. The city is one of several possible locations for the ancient city of Tibula.

It has a permanent population of 5,144, increasing to 10,000 to 15,000 with summer tourism. The main town square has various tourist shops and restaurants; many of these close in the off-season. Immediately to the north of the town is Rena Bianca, Santa Teresa's beach.

== Demographics ==
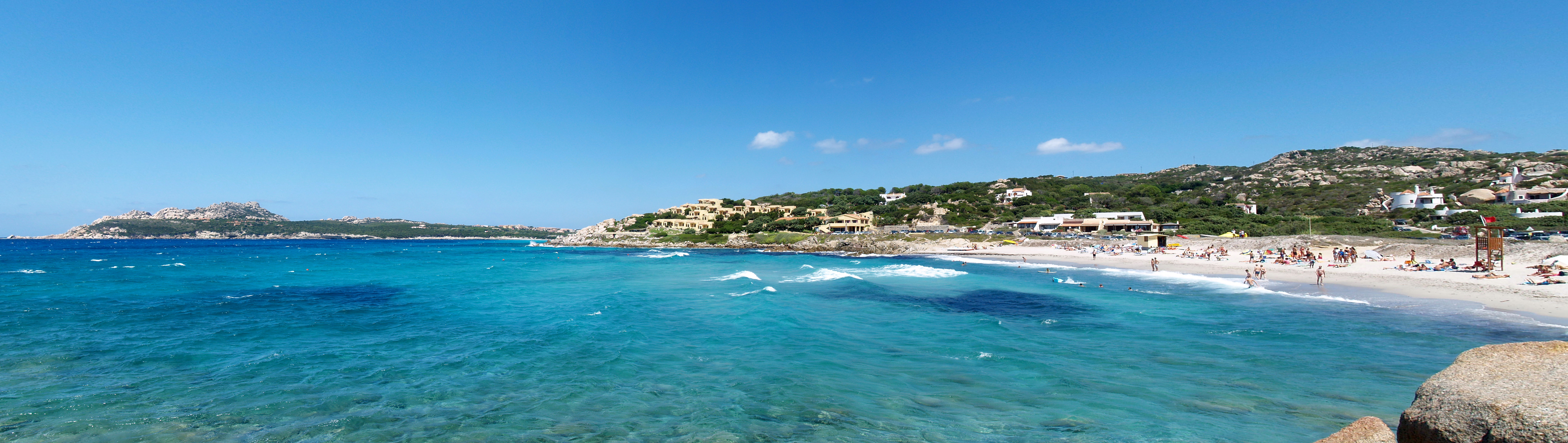
Santa Reparata

As of 2026, the population is 5,144, of which 50.5% are male, and 49.5% are female. Minors make up 10.8% of the population, and seniors make up 28.1%.

Historical population

Year	Pop.	±%
1861	1,522	—
1871	1,696	+11.4%
1881	2,105	+24.1%
1901	2,301	+9.3%
1911	2,523	+9.6%
1921	2,468	−2.2%
1931	2,567	+4.0%
1936	2,546	−0.8%

Year	Pop.	±%
1951	2,711	+6.5%
1961	2,840	+4.8%
1971	3,162	+11.3%
1981	3,752	+18.7%
1991	4,024	+7.2%
2001	4,349	+8.1%
2011	5,018	+15.4%
2021	5,006	−0.2%

Source: ISTAT

=== Immigration ===
As of 2025, immigrants make up 13.3% of the total population. The 5 largest foreign countries of birth are Romania, Germany, Ukraine, France, and Russia.
