= Buddusò =

Buddusò Uddusò (Sardinian)
- Comune
- Comune di Buddusò
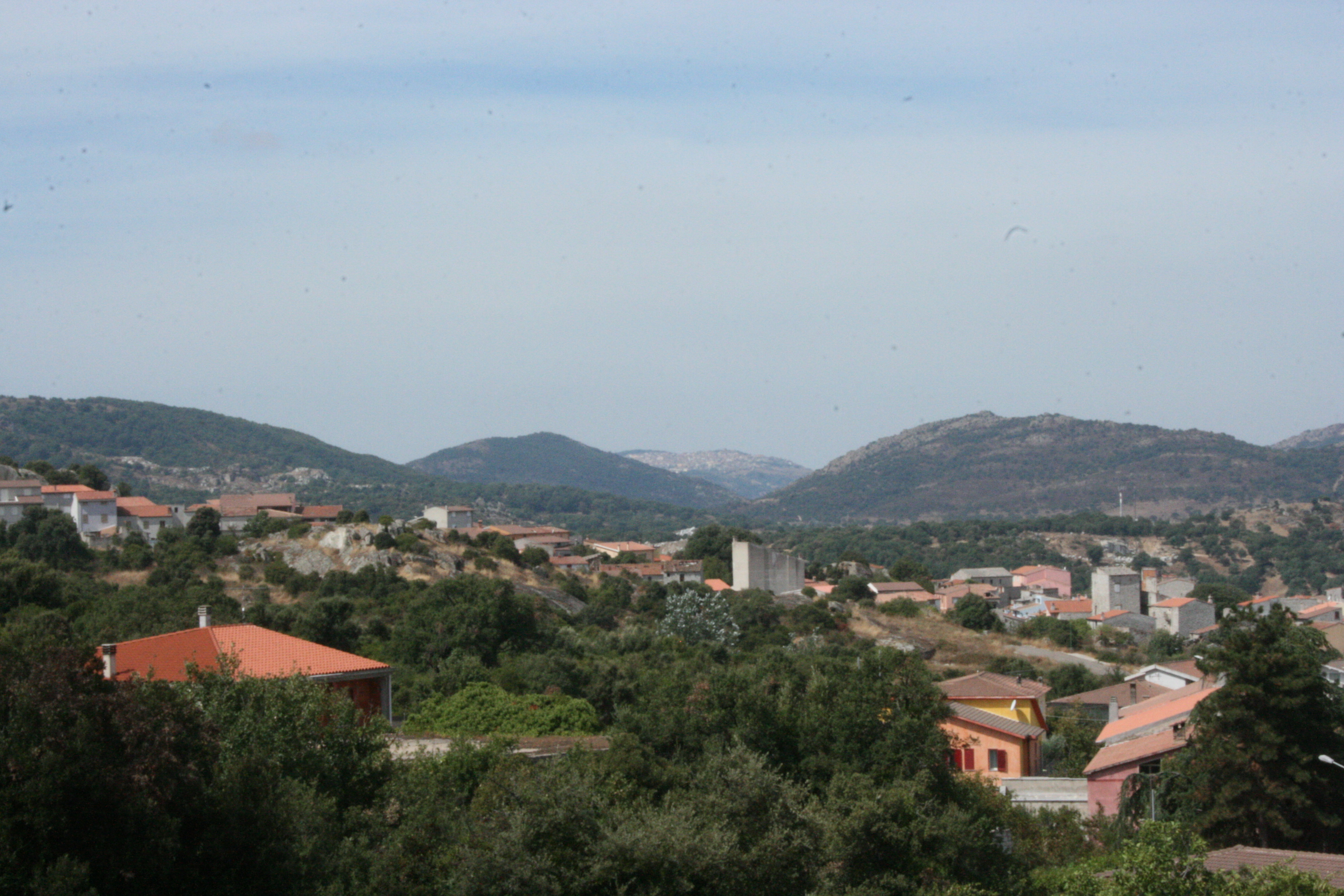
- View of Buddusò

- Location within Sardinia
- Coordinates: 40°35′N 9°15′E
- Country: Italy
- Region: Sardinia
- Province: Gallura North-East Sardinia

Government
  - Mayor: Giovanni Antonio Satta

Area
  - Total: 176.84 km^{2} (68.28 sq mi)
- Elevation: 700 m (2,300 ft)

Population (2026)
  - Total: 3,487
  - Density: 19.72/km^{2} (51.07/sq mi)
- Demonym: Buddusoini
- Time zone: UTC+1 (CET)
  - Summer (DST): UTC+2 (CEST)
- Postal code: 07020
- Dialing code: 079
- Website: Official website

Buddusò (Sardinian: Uddusò) is a town and comune (municipality) in the Province of Gallura North-East Sardinia in the autonomous island region of Sardinia in Italy, located about 150 kilometres (93 mi) north of Cagliari and about 45 kilometres (28 mi) southwest of Olbia. It has 3,487 inhabitants.

Buddusò borders the municipalities of Alà dei Sardi, Bitti, Oschiri, Osidda, and Pattada.

== Climate ==
Climate data for Buddusò (1981–2010)
Month	Jan	Feb	Mar	Apr	May	Jun	Jul	Aug	Sep	Oct	Nov	Dec	Year
Mean daily maximum °C (°F)	7.5 (45.5)	8.4 (47.1)	11.5 (52.7)	13.4 (56.1)	19.7 (67.5)	24.4 (75.9)	28.1 (82.6)	27.9 (82.2)	22.4 (72.3)	18.2 (64.8)	12.0 (53.6)	8.2 (46.8)	16.8 (62.3)
Daily mean °C (°F)	5.4 (41.7)	5.9 (42.6)	8.5 (47.3)	10.3 (50.5)	15.7 (60.3)	19.9 (67.8)	23.2 (73.8)	23.1 (73.6)	18.4 (65.1)	14.9 (58.8)	9.7 (49.5)	6.3 (43.3)	13.4 (56.2)
Mean daily minimum °C (°F)	3.2 (37.8)	3.3 (37.9)	5.4 (41.7)	7.2 (45.0)	11.6 (52.9)	15.3 (59.5)	18.2 (64.8)	18.2 (64.8)	14.4 (57.9)	11.5 (52.7)	7.4 (45.3)	4.3 (39.7)	10.0 (50.0)
Average precipitation mm (inches)	86.6 (3.41)	54.8 (2.16)	59.8 (2.35)	71.0 (2.80)	48.7 (1.92)	35.1 (1.38)	17.4 (0.69)	19.7 (0.78)	45.8 (1.80)	54.6 (2.15)	103.9 (4.09)	107.1 (4.22)	704.5 (27.75)
Source: Sistema nazionale protezione ambiente

== Demographics ==
As of 2026, the population is 3,487, of which 50.3% are male, and 49.7% are female. Minors make up 16.9% of the population, and seniors make up 25.0%.

Historical population
Year	Pop.	±%
1951	4,548	—
1961	4,856	+6.8%
1971	4,138	−14.8%
1981	4,208	+1.7%
1991	4,225	+0.4%
2001	4,145	−1.9%
2011	3,979	−4.0%
2021	3,659	−8.0%
Source: ISTAT

=== Immigration ===
As of 2025, immigrants make up 2.4% of the total population. The 5 largest foreign countries of birth are Albania, France, Romania, Germany, and Belgium.
