= Calangianus =

Calangianus Calanzanos (Sardinian) Caragnani (Gallurese)
- Comune
- Comune di Calangianus
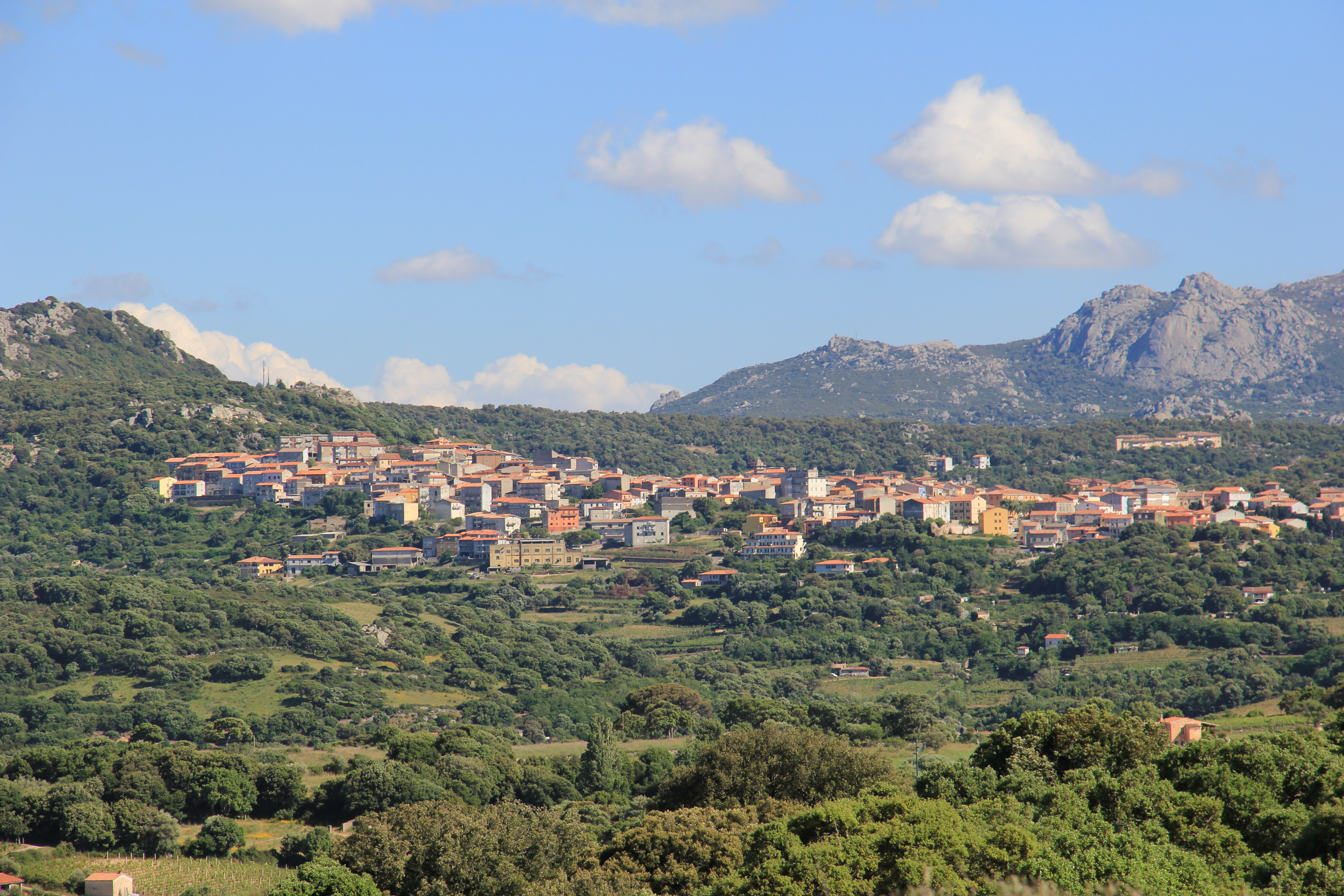
- View of Calangianus

- Location within Sardinia
- Coordinates: 40°55′N 9°12′E
- Country: Italy
- Region: Sardinia
- Province: Gallura North-East Sardinia

Government
  - Mayor: Fabio Albieri

Area
  - Total: 126.84 km^{2} (48.97 sq mi)
- Elevation: 518 m (1,699 ft)

Population (2026)
  - Total: 3,692
  - Density: 29.11/km^{2} (75.39/sq mi)
- Demonym: Calangianesi
- Time zone: UTC+1 (CET)
  - Summer (DST): UTC+2 (CEST)
- Postal code: 07023
- Dialing code: 079
- Website: Official website

Calangianus (Italian: [kalanˈdʒaːnus]; Sardinian: Calanzanos [kalanˈdzanɔzɔ]; Gallurese: Caragnani [karaˈɲanj]) is a town and comune (municipality) in the Province of Gallura North-East Sardinia in the autonomous island region of Sardinia in Italy, located about 190 kilometres (120 mi) north of Cagliari and about 25 kilometres (16 mi) west of Olbia. It has 3,692 inhabitants.

Calangianus is surrounded by large cork woods, for whose work was described as "Cork's Capital".

== History ==
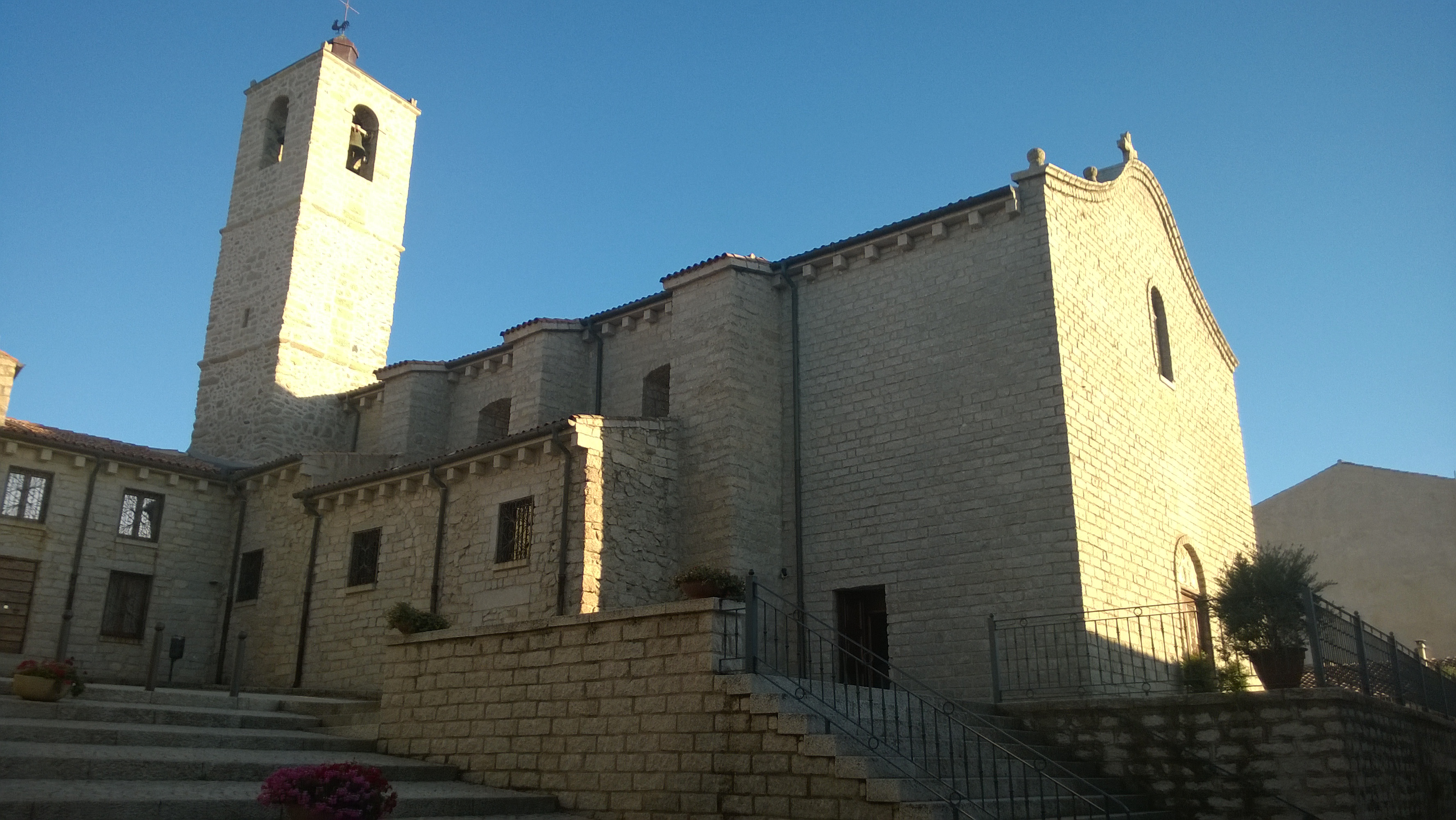
Church of St. Just

The territory of Calangianus has been inhabited since the Bronze Age, and was also settled during the Roma Republic and the Roman Empire. This was proved by the discovery of a multitude of historical piece and archeological sites. Among them are the Tombs of the Giants of Pascaredda, the Fountain "Li Paladini" and 9 "nuraghi", but five of them are destroyed.

In the Middle Ages, Calangianus belonged to the Giudicato of Gallura, and was later ruled by the Aragonese and the Spanish Empire. In the 17th century Calangianus has an important repopulation after several epidemics that scourged Sardinia, and became the second city of Gallura for population. In 1771 it became autonomous. In the early 19th century some entrepreneurs moved to Calangianus, and they transformed the cork forests of Calangianus into a source of wealth. In time, nearly the entire population of Calangianus was working on cork.

The 20th century marked a turning point for Calangianus economic. In the second half of the century Calangianus was home to 300 industries, a number that by 2012 had increased to 677.

Calangianus in 1977 held its first exhibition of cork, and in 1987 obtained the title of one of the hundred most industrialized municipalities of Italy.

== Demographics ==
As of 2026, the population is 3,692, of which 49.9% are male, and 50.1% are female. Minors make up 10.9% of the population, and seniors make up 30.1%.

Historical population

Year	Pop.	±%
1861	1,543	—
1871	1,678	+8.7%
1881	1,893	+12.8%
1901	2,583	+36.5%
1911	3,004	+16.3%
1921	3,038	+1.1%
1931	3,351	+10.3%
1936	3,552	+6.0%

Year	Pop.	±%
1951	4,293	+20.9%
1961	4,472	+4.2%
1971	4,315	−3.5%
1981	4,505	+4.4%
1991	4,679	+3.9%
2001	4,642	−0.8%
2011	4,267	−8.1%
2021	3,853	−9.7%

Source: ISTAT

=== Immigration ===
As of 2025, immigrants make up 6.2% of the total population. The 5 largest foreign countries of birth are Morocco, Romania, Argentina, France, and Senegal.

== Main sights ==
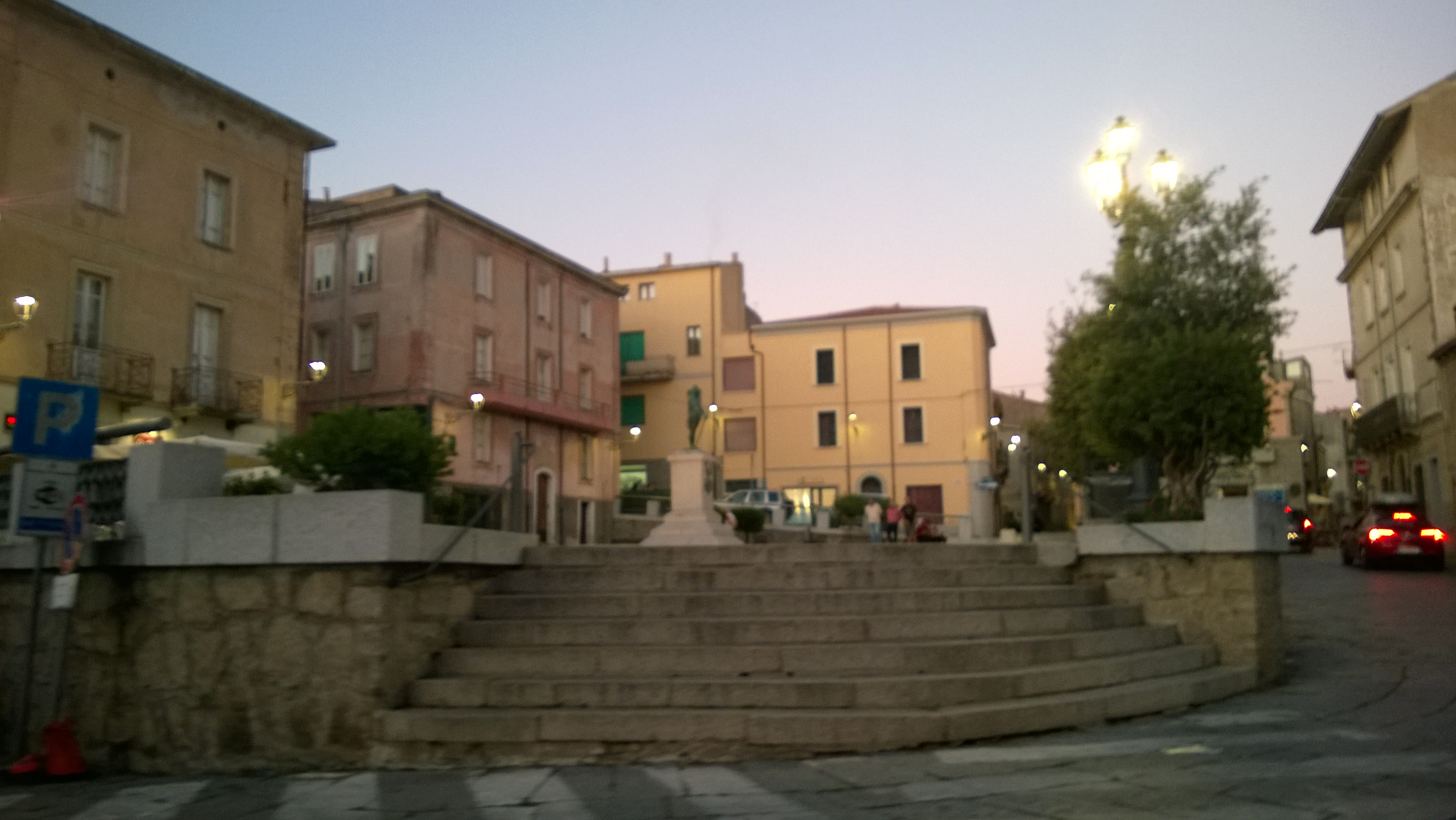
Square of Calangianus

- Church of St. Just, built in the 17th century. It is an example of architecture typical of Gallura, completely built of granite and decorated to the smallest detail.
- Church of Santa Maria degli Angeli, built in the 18th century next to the convent of the Capuchin friars. The convent is home to the cork museum.
- The church of Santa Croce and the Oratory Our Lady of the Rosary (16th century). The Our Lady of the Rosary chapel houses the Museum of Sacred Art.
- The church of St. Anne, built in 1665, located in the charming old town of Calangianus.
- The palace La Littranga (18th century)
- The palace Corda, built in the nineteenth century by the first contractor of Calangianus cork.
