= Gallurese =

Romance language spoken in northeastern Sardinia

- gadduresu
- Pronunciation: [ɡaɖːuˈrezu]
- Native to: Italy
- Region: Gallura (northern Sardinia)
- Ethnicity: Corsicans; Sardinians
- Native speakers: (100,000 cited 1999)
- Language family: Indo-European: Italic; Latino-Faliscan; Latin; Romance; Italo-Western; Italo-Dalmatian; Italo-Romance; Tuscan; Corsican (Note: The grouping of Gallurese is disputed, although it is most commonly considered a dialect of Corsican that is also similar or heavily influenced by Sardinian, Tuscan or standard Italian.); Gallurese

Official status
- Recognised minority language in: Sardinia (Italy)

Language codes
- ISO 639-3: sdn
- Glottolog: gall1276
- ELP: Gallurese Sardinian
- Linguasphere: 51-AAA-pd
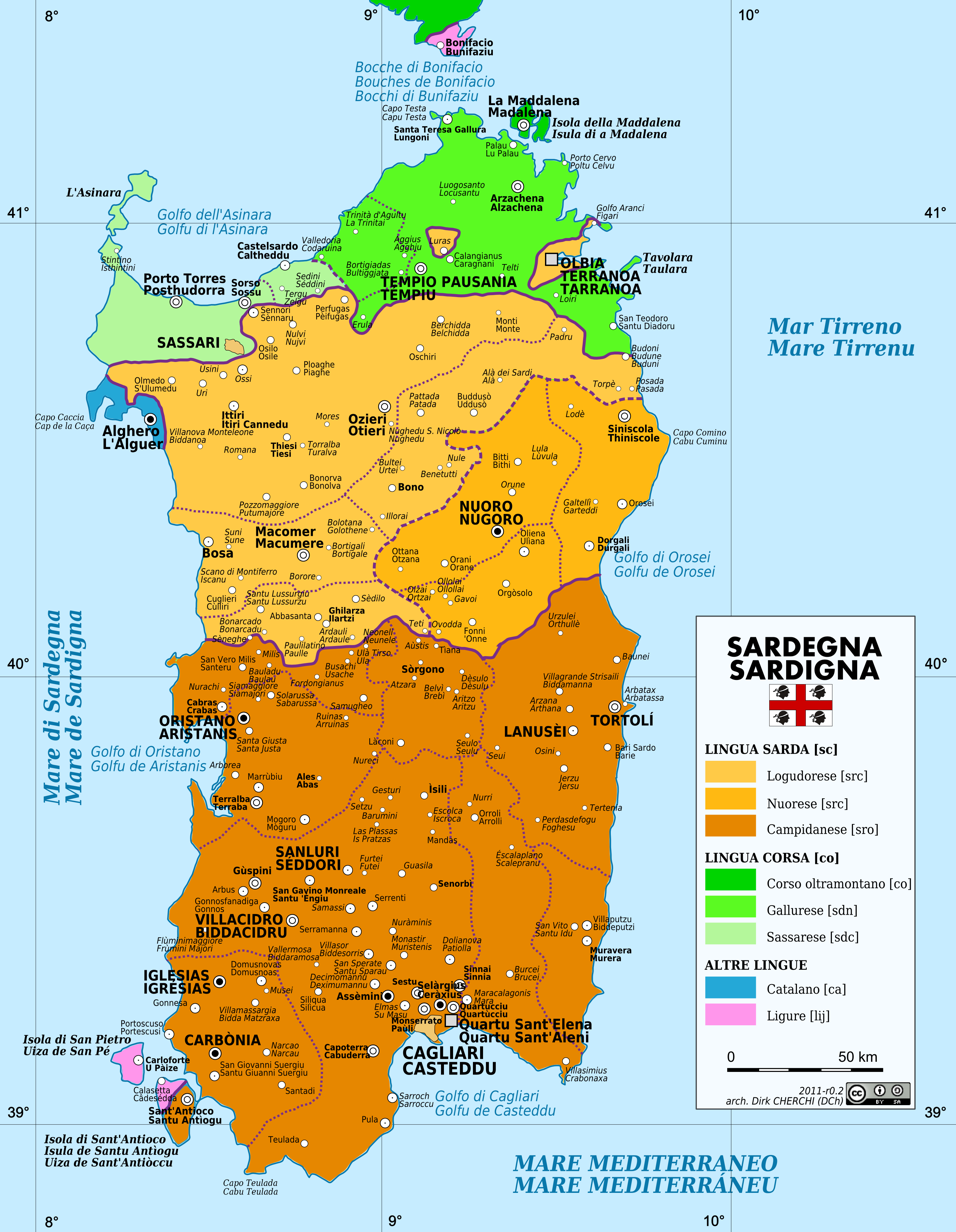
- Languages and dialects of Sardinia

Gallurese (gadduresu) is a Romance dialect of the Italo-Dalmatian family spoken in the region of Gallura, northeastern Sardinia. Gallurese is variously described as a distinct southern dialect of Corsican or transitional language of the dialect continuum between Corsican and Sardinian. "Gallurese International Day" (Ciurrata Internaziunali di la Linga Gadduresa) takes place each year in Palau (Sardinia) with the participation of orators from other areas, including Corsica.

Gallurese is generally considered a southern Corsican dialect, sharing close resemblance in morphology and vocabulary with the dialects of Sartene and Porto-Vecchio on Corsica, whereas its phonology and syntax are similar to those of Sardinian. One third of Gallurese vocabulary is also influenced by Logudorese Sardinian, Catalan, and Spanish.

The Sassarese language, spoken in the area of Sassari, shares similar transitional traits between Tuscan, Corsican and Sardinian but, in comparison with Gallurese, is definitely closer to the Logudorese dialects of Sardinian.

== History ==
The most ancient literary sources in Gallurese date back to the early 17th century, mainly as poetry and religious odes. Some late Middle Age fragments suggest that the formation of the language could be dated to the early 15th century. The origin and the development of Gallurese are debated. Max Leopold Wagner and Maurice Le Lannou argued that successive migration waves from Southern Corsica, promoted under the Aragonese rule to repopulate an area devastated by famine and pandemics, were crucial in the formation of a transitional language.

== Typical constitutional elements of Gallurese ==
Corsican dialects, including Gallurese.

- the plural form of nouns in -i (ghjanni or polti 'doors') are like in Corsican and Italian, and not as in -s like in Sardinian (jannas, portas), French, Spanish, Catalan, etc.
- Latin 'll' has become -dd- (like casteddu, coraddu 'castle', 'coral'), the same as in Sardinian, southern Corsican and Sicilian (but castellu, corallu in northern Corsican);
- -r- modified to -l- (poltu 'port', while portu in Corsican);
- -chj- and -ghj- sounds (ghjesgia 'church', occhji 'eyes'), like in Corsican, while Sardinian is cresia, ogros.
- articles lu, la, li, like in ancient Corsican dialects (u, a, i in modern Corsican, su, sa, sos, sas in Sardinian);

== Relation to Corsican ==
Gallurese is classified by some linguists as a dialect of Corsican, and by others as a dialect of Sardinian. In any case, a great deal of similarity exists between Southern Corsican dialects and Gallurese, while there is relatively more distance from the neighbouring Sardinian varieties.

Concluding the debate speech, the Sardinian linguist Mauro Maxia stated as follows:

From a historical and geographic point of view, Gallurese might be classed either under Corsican or Sardinian, in light of its presence specific to Sardinia for the last six-seven centuries. From a linguistic point of view, Gallurese might be defined as:

- Predominantly Corsican on the phono-morphological level;
- Predominantly Sardinian on the syntactic level;
- Predominantly Corsican on the lexical level, with a lot of Sardinian, Catalan, and Spanish words which make up around 1/3 of the total vocabulary.

Gallurese is less Corsican than many scholars make it out to be. What makes Gallurese a different language from Corsican, rather than a Corsican dialect, are many grammatical features, especially related to syntax, and the significant number of Sardinian, Catalan and Spanish loanwords.

It can be therefore claimed that, from a grammatical and lexical point of view, Gallurese is a transitional language between Corsican and Sardinian.

— Mauro Maxia, Seminar on the Gallurese language, Palau 2014

The Regional Government of Sardinia has recognized Gallurese, along with Sassarese as separate languages, distinct from Sardinian.

=== Sample of text ===
An excerpt from a hymn dedicated to the Virgin Mary.

Standard Italian

Tu sei nata per incanto
deliziosa bellezza
la migliore di Luogosanto
la più bella di Gallura.

Sei tanto bella che ogni cuore
s'innamora di te
per gli occhi miei un fiore
ed è la migliore che c’è.

Io sono vecchio e canuto
e il mio tempo sta passando
però sempre burlando
come m'avevi conosciuto.

Per quanta strada devo fare
sempre onore a Luogosanto
che è la terra dell'incanto
per chiunque chi viene a visitarla.

La patrona di Gallura
abbiamo noi in Luogosanto
incoronata di canti
così bella creatura.

Southern Corsican

Tù sè nata par incantu
diliziosa biddezza
a meddu di Locusantu
a più bedda di Gaddura.

Sè bedda chì ugni cori
s’innamurighja di tè
pà l’ochja mei un fiori
ed hè a meddu chì ci hè.

Ié socu vechju canutu
è socu à tempu passendu
parò sempri burlendu
comu m’eti cunnisciutu

Quantu campu devu fà
sempri anori a Locusantu
ch’hè a tarra di l’incantu
di quà veni à sughjurnà.

A Patrona di Gaddura
l’emu no' in Locusantu
incurunata da u cantu
cusì bedda criatura.

Gallurese

Tu sei nata par incantu
diliziosa elmosùra
la meddu di Locusantu
la più bedda di Gaddura.

Sei bedda chi dugna cori
s’innammurigghja di te
pa l’occhj mei un fiori
ed è la meddu chi c’è.

E socu vecchju canutu
e socu a tempu passendi
parò sempri burrulendi
comu m’eti cunnisciutu

Cantu campu decu fà
sempri onori a Locusantu
ch’è la tarra di l’incantu
di ca veni a istragnà.

La Patrona di Gaddura
l’emu noi in Locusantu
incurunata da lu cantu
cussì bedda criatura.

Sassarese

Tu sei nadda pà incantu
diriziosa ermosura
la megliu di Loggusantu
la più bedda di Gaddura.

Sei bedda chi dugna cori
s'innamureggia di te
pà l'occi mei un fiori
e sei la megliu chi v'è.

E soggu vecciu canuddu
e soggu a tempu passendi
parò sempri buffunendi
cumenti m'abeddi cunnisciddu.

Cantu campu aggiu da fà
sempri onori a Loggusantu
chi è la terra di l'incantu
di ca veni a visità.

La Patrona di Gaddura
l'abemmu noi in Loggusantu
incurunadda da lu cantu
cussì bedda criaddura.

Logudorese Sardinian

Tue ses naschida pro incantu
delitziosa ermosura
sa menzus de Logusantu
sa prus bella de Gallura.

Ses bella gai chi dontzi coro
s'innamorat de tene
pro sos ogros meos unu frore
e ses sa menzus chi b'est.

E soe betzu e pilicanu
e su tempus meu est colende
pero soe semper brullende
comente m'azis connotu.

Pro cantu bivo apo a fàghere
semper onore a Logusantu
chi est sa terra de s'incantu
de chie benit a la bisitare.

Sa patrona de Gallura
la tenimus nois in Logusantu
coronada de su cantu
gai bella criadura.

English translation

You were born of enchantment
Delightful beauty
The best of Luogosanto
The most beautiful in Gallura.

You are so beautiful that every heart
Falls in love with you
A flower to my eyes
The best one that there is.

I am old and grey
And my time is passing by
But I am always cheering up
The same way as when you met me.

No matter how many fields I must till
I will always honor Luogosanto
For it is a land of enchantment
For whoever comes to visit it.

The Patron of Gallura
Is here for us in Luogosanto
Crowned by hymns
Such a splendid creature.

== See also ==
- Sardinia
- Corsican language
- Sassarese
- Sardinian language
