= Goceano =

Historical region in Sardinia, Italy

Coordinates: 40°25′N 9°00′E

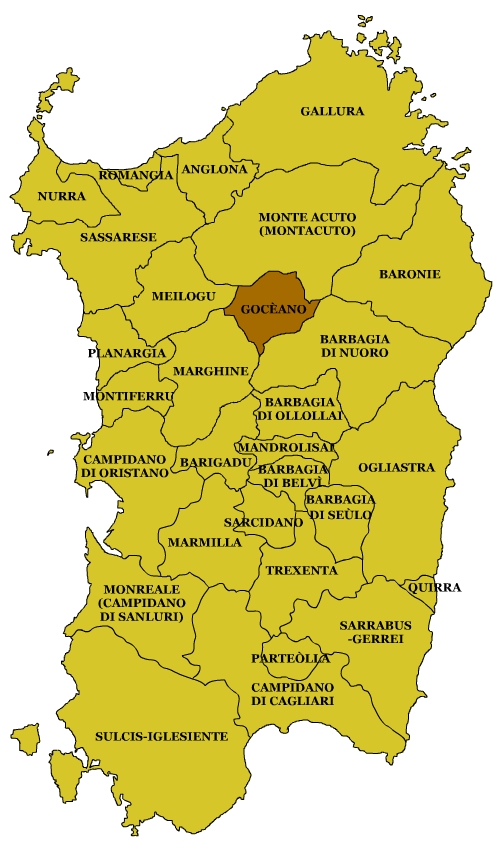
Map Goceano

The Goceano (Sardinian: Costèra) is a historical and geographical region of center-north of Sardinia island, Italy. It covers a surface of 480 km^{2} and has a population of 13,000 inhabitants (27 inhabitants/km^{2}). It is located inside the Province of Sassari, the main urban centres are Bono, Italy, considered the traditional Goceano's chieftown, Anela, Benetutti, Burgos, Bultei, Nule, Esporlatu, Illorai and Bottidda.

The territory is characterised by wooded mountains and alluvial valleys, the Marghine Chain (highest peak: Monte Rasu 1259 metres) and the Tirso Valley.

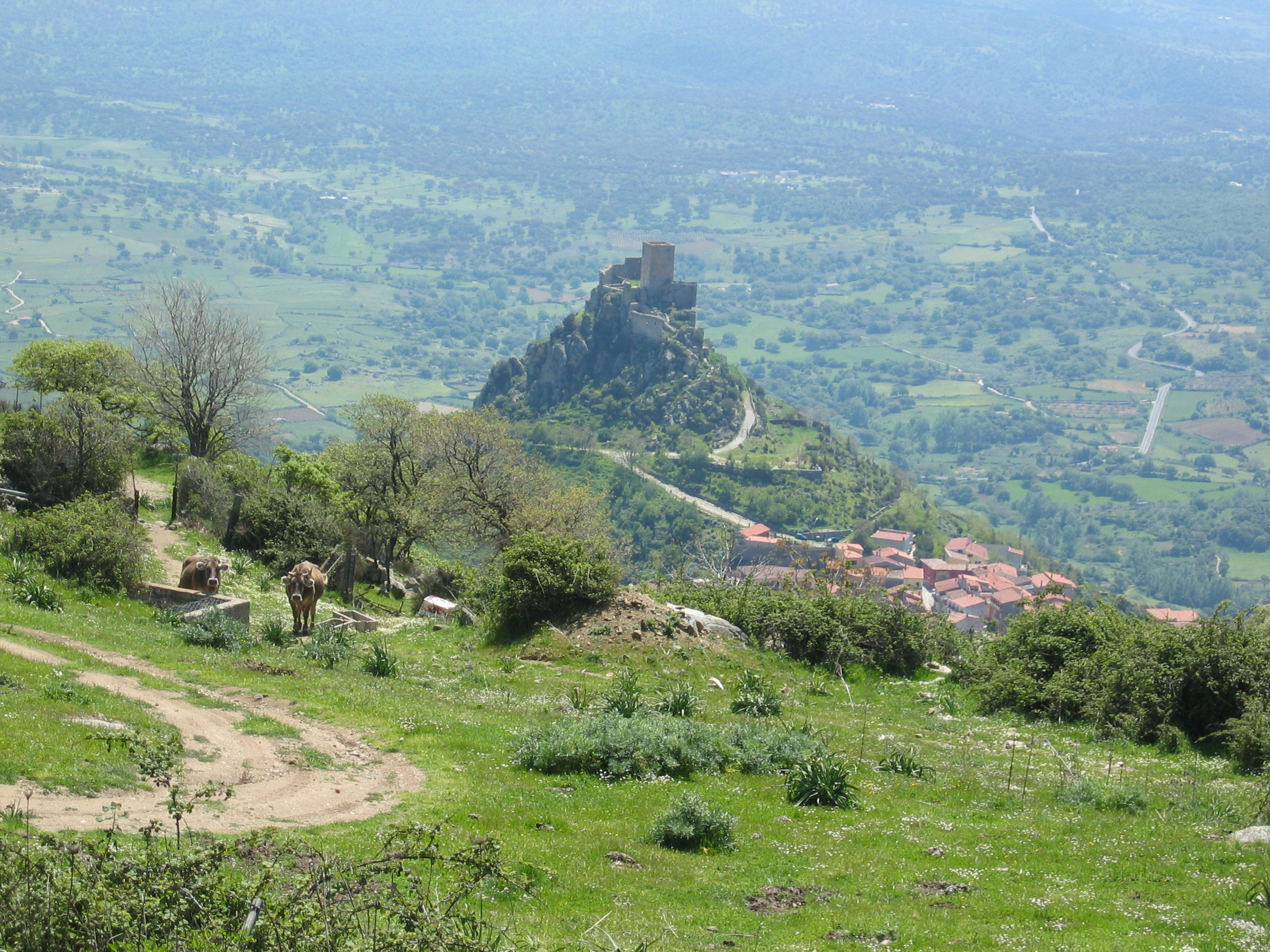
Castle of Burgos.

== History ==
According to the Sardinian historian Giovanni Francesco Fara (1543–1591) the Goceano, in Latin Gothianus, takes its name from the Goths, some of whom settled down in the region during the Middle Ages.

The region is historically characterised by the Castle of Burgos, built in 1134 by the Giudice of Logudoro Gonario II of Torres. The castle was considered in the 14th century "one of the strongest and efficient forts of Sardinia".

The King Peter IV of Aragon appointed Marianus IV of Arborea as Count of Goceano, in 1339. He held the fief and the castle also after his crowning as giudice of Arborea.

In 1410, after the defeat of Arborea in the war against the Kingdom of Aragon, the Goceano became a fiefdom ruled by Leonardo Cubello.

== Bibliography ==
- S. Chessa, Le Dimore rurali in Sardegna, con particolare riferimento al Monteacuto, al Goceano, al Meilogu e alla Gallura, Cargeghe, Documenta, 2008.
- Vittorio Angius, voce Goceano, in Goffredo Casalis, Dizionario geografico, storico, statistico, commerciale degli Stati di S.M. il Re di Sardegna, 1841.
- Francesco Cesare Casula, Dizionario storico sardo, edizione riveduta ed ampliata Cagliari, L'Unione Sarda, 2006, ISBN 9788871382418.
