= Orotelli =

Orotelli Oroteddi
- Comune
- Comune di Orotelli
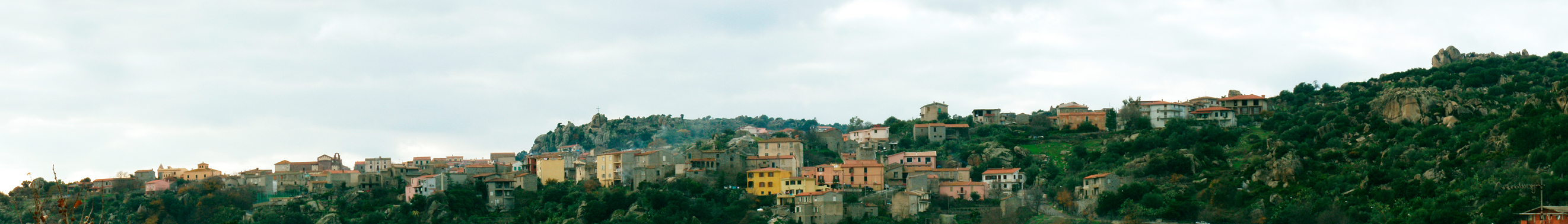
- View of Orotelli

- Location within Sardinia
- Coordinates: 40°18′N 9°7′E
- Country: Italy
- Region: Sardinia
- Province: Province of Nuoro (NU)

Government
  - Mayor: Giovannino Marteddu

Area
  - Total: 61.18 km^{2} (23.62 sq mi)
- Elevation: 406 m (1,332 ft)

Population (2026)
  - Total: 1,824
  - Density: 29.81/km^{2} (77.22/sq mi)
- Demonym: Orotellesi
- Time zone: UTC+1 (CET)
  - Summer (DST): UTC+2 (CEST)
- Postal code: 08020
- Dialing code: 0784
- Website: Official website

Orotelli (Sardinian: Oroteddi) is a town and comune (municipality) in the Province of Nuoro in the autonomous island region of Sardinia in Italy, located about 120 kilometres (75 mi) north of Cagliari and about 20 kilometres (12 mi) west of Nuoro. It has 1,824 inhabitants.

The town is known for its traditional carnival costumes, including distinctive masks worn by the ''Thurpos''.

Orotelli borders the municipalities of Bono, Bottidda, Illorai, Oniferi, and Orani.

== History ==
Human presence in the area is testified as early as the Nuragic period. In the Middle Ages it was part of the Giudicato of Torres and then of that of Arborea, until falling to the Aragonese.

== Demographics ==
As of 2026, the population is 1,824, of which 49.8% are male, and 50.2% are female. Minors make up 13.9% of the population, and seniors make up 30.2%.

Historical population

Year	Pop.	±%
1861	1,521	—
1871	1,654	+8.7%
1881	1,852	+12.0%
1901	2,295	+23.9%
1911	2,568	+11.9%
1921	2,523	−1.8%
1931	2,652	+5.1%
1936	2,787	+5.1%

Year	Pop.	±%
1951	3,122	+12.0%
1961	3,279	+5.0%
1971	3,010	−8.2%
1981	2,671	−11.3%
1991	2,484	−7.0%
2001	2,314	−6.8%
2011	2,152	−7.0%
2021	1,905	−11.5%

Source: ISTAT

=== Immigration ===
As of 2025, immigrants make up 4.0% of the population. The 5 largest foreign countries of birth are Germany, Belgium, France, Romania, and Morocco.

== Main sights ==
- Parish church of San Giovanni Battista (1116), originally in Romanesque style. It has a 14th-century bell tower with a bas-relief decoration including figures and arcane symbols.
- Several nuraghes and Giants' graves
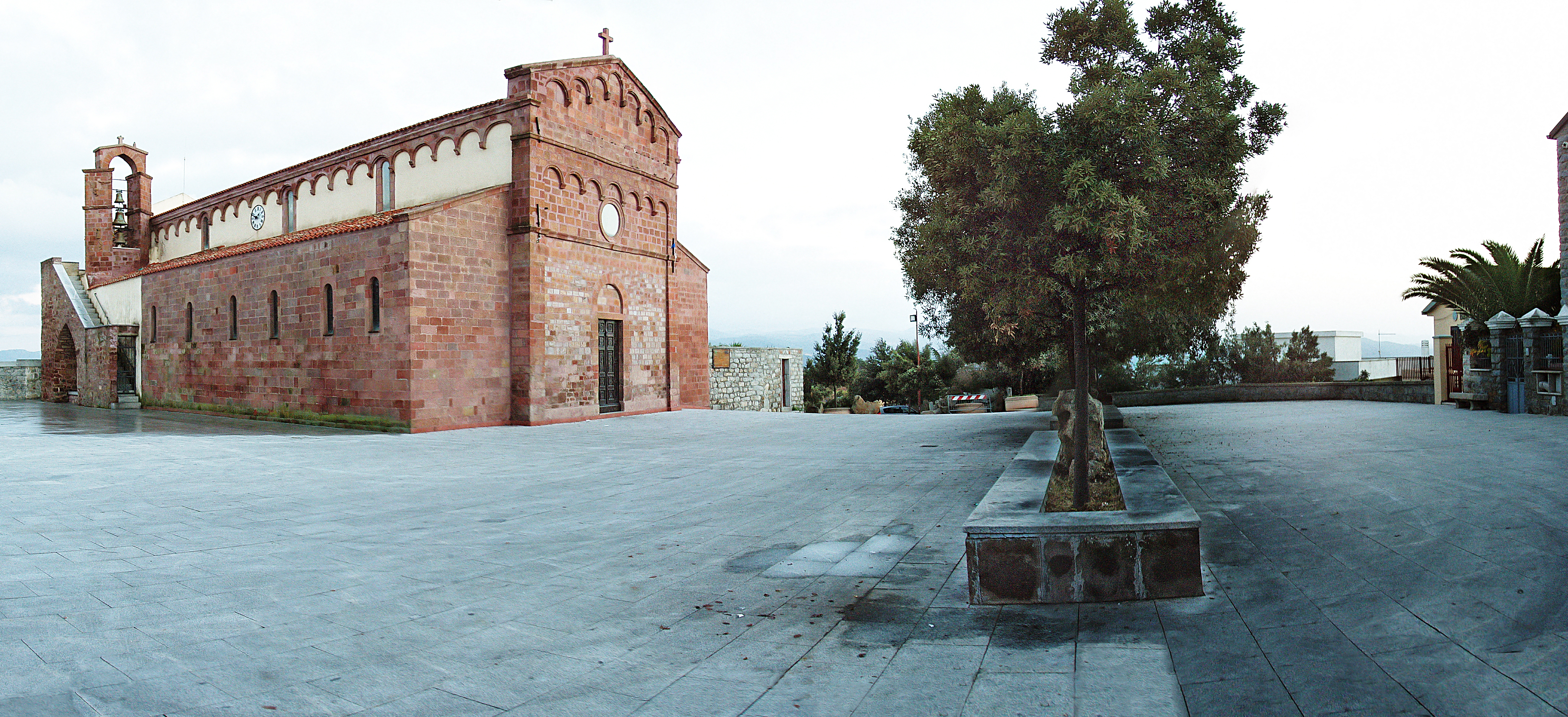
  Church of San Giovanni
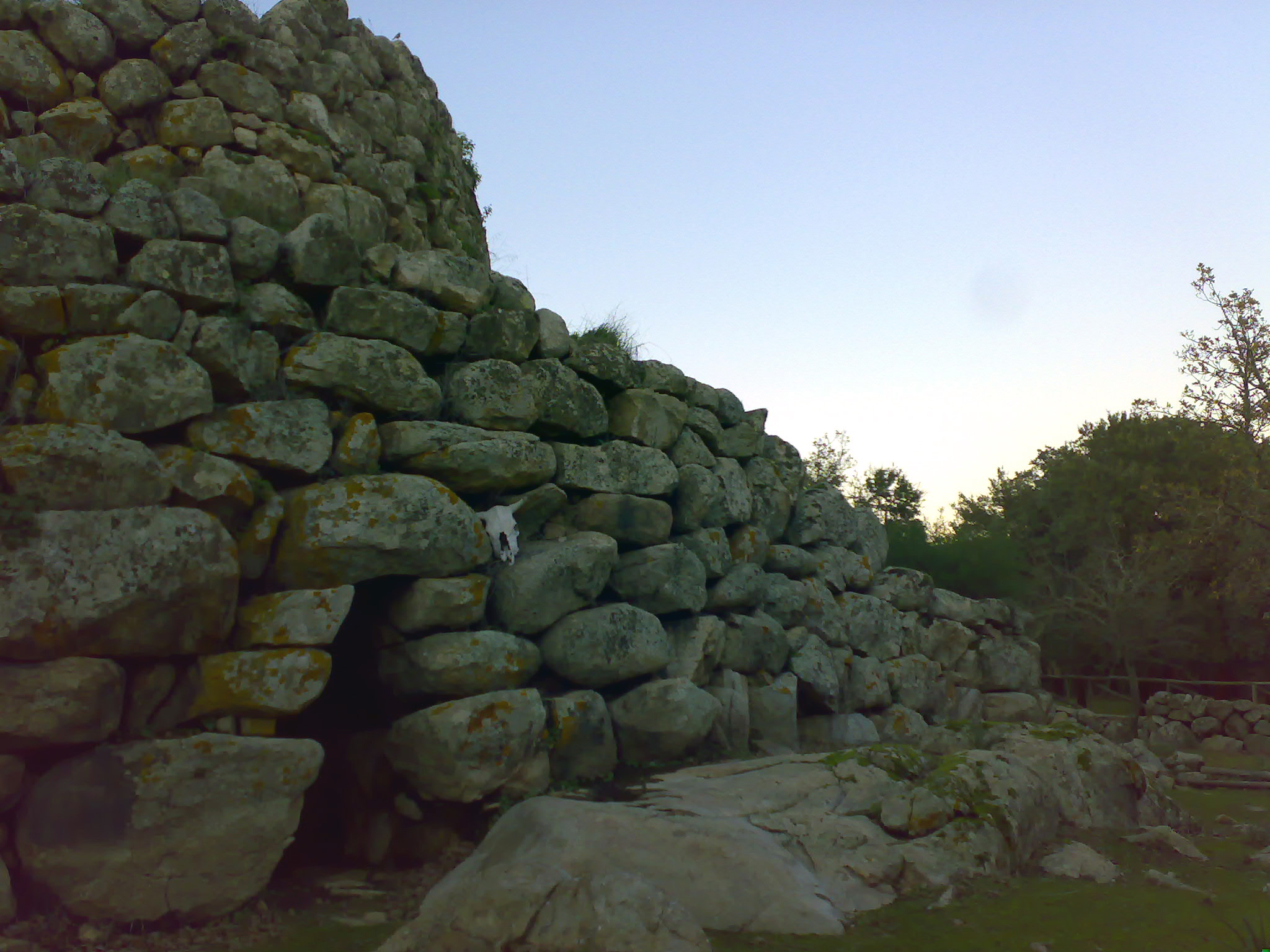
  Nuraghe Aeddo
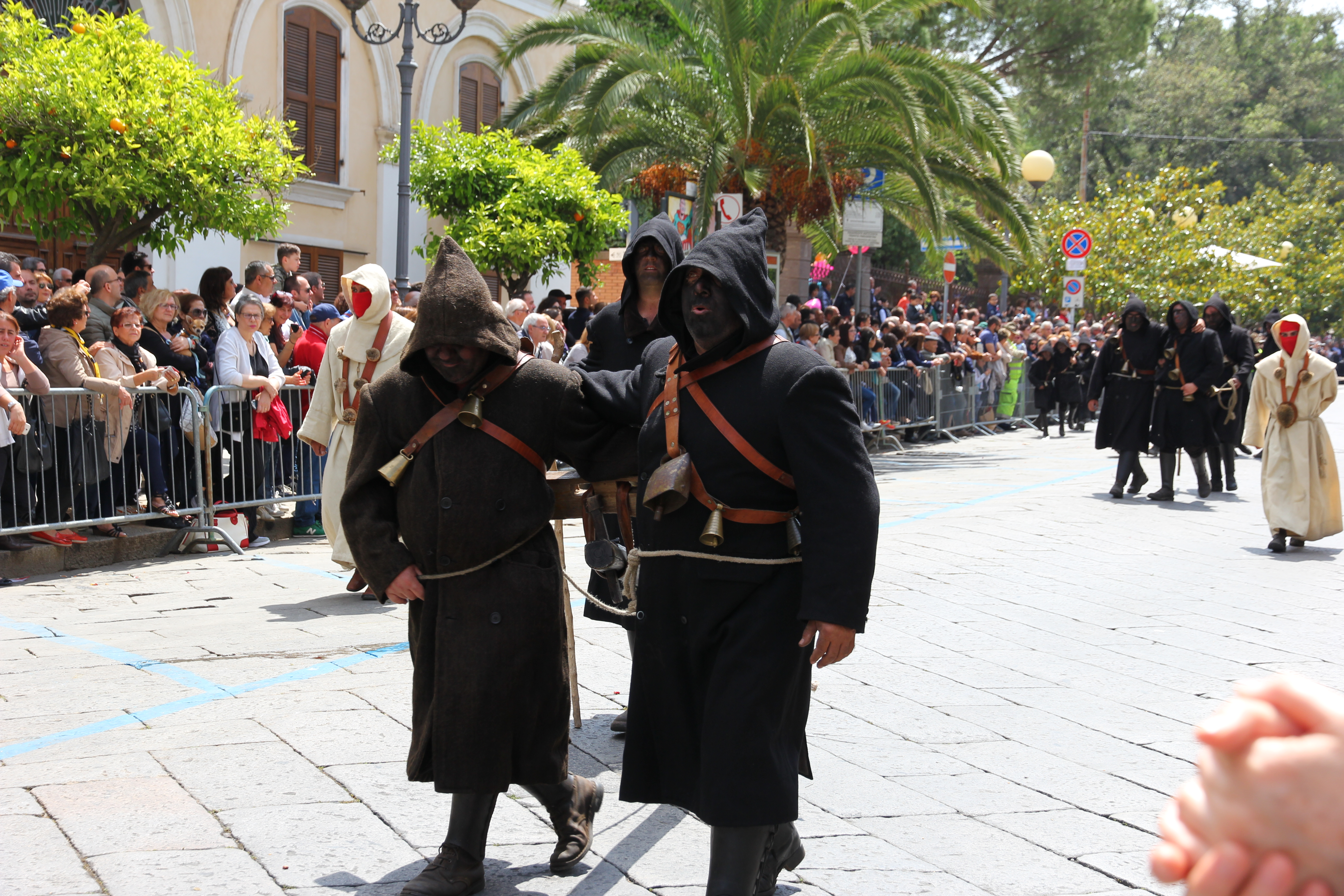
  Sos Thurpos, the masks of Orotelli
