= Ittireddu =

Ittireddu Itireddu (Sardinian)
- Comune
- Comune di Ittireddu
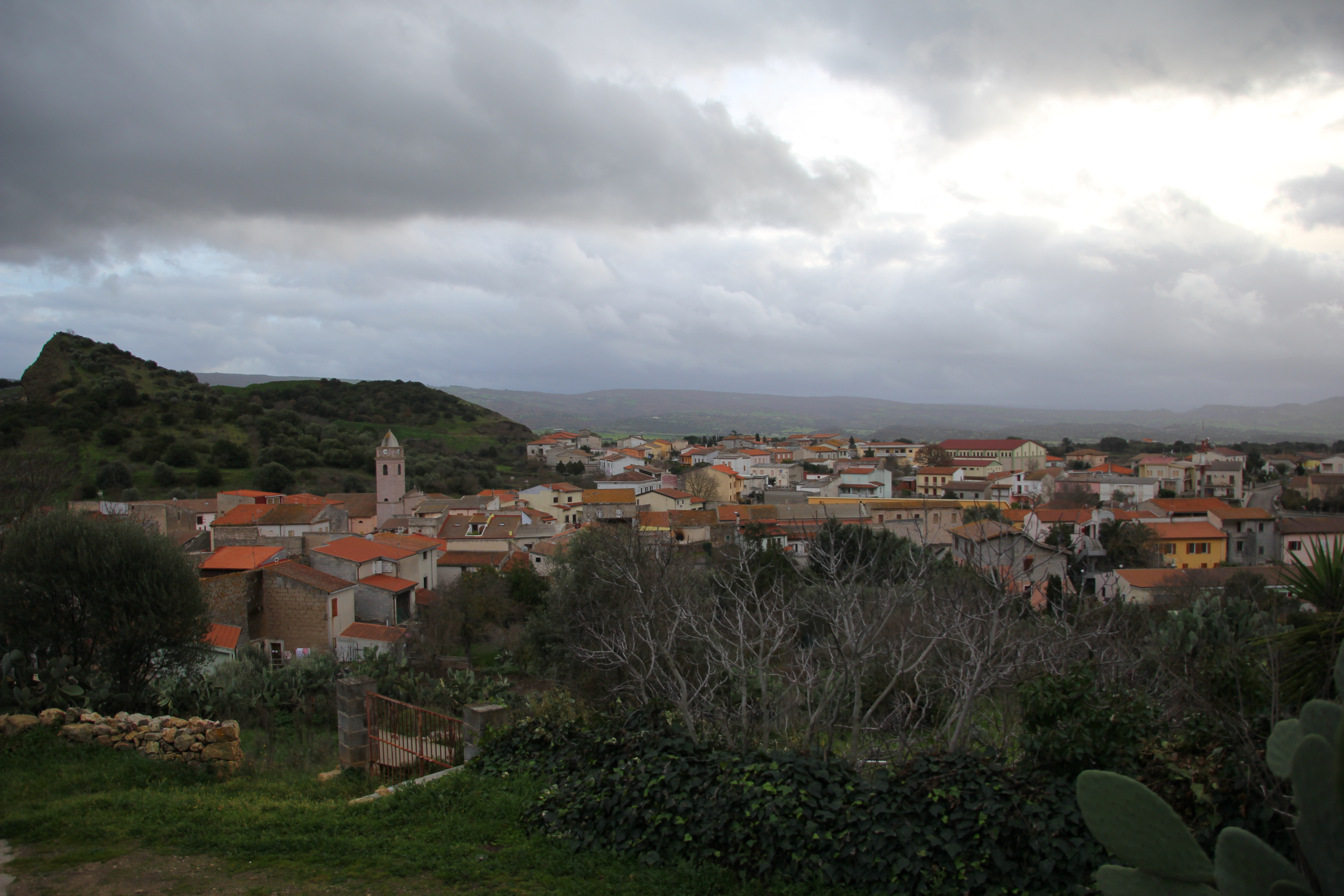
- View of Ittireddu

- Location within Sardinia
- Coordinates: 40°33′N 8°54′E
- Country: Italy
- Region: Sardinia
- Metropolitan city: Sassari (SS)

Government
  - Mayor: Franco Campus

Area
  - Total: 23.69 km^{2} (9.15 sq mi)
- Elevation: 313 m (1,027 ft)

Population (2026)
  - Total: 457
  - Density: 19.3/km^{2} (50.0/sq mi)
- Demonym: Ittireddesi
- Time zone: UTC+1 (CET)
  - Summer (DST): UTC+2 (CEST)
- Postal code: 07010
- Dialing code: 079
- Website: Official website

Ittireddu (Sardinian: Itireddu) is a village and comune (municipality) in the Metropolitan City of Sassari in the autonomous island region of Sardinia in Italy, located about 150 kilometres (93 mi) north of Cagliari and about 35 kilometres (22 mi) southeast of Sassari. It has 457 inhabitants.

Sights include the church of Santa Croce, an example of Byzantine-Romanesque architecture (9th-13th centuries).

Ittireddu borders the municipalities of Bonorva, Mores, Nughedu San Nicolò, and Ozieri.

== Demographics ==
As of 2026, the population is 457, of which 52.1% are male, and 47.9% are female. Minors make up 8.8% of the population, and seniors make up 32.4%.

Historical population

Year	Pop.	±%
1861	729	—
1871	794	+8.9%
1881	769	−3.1%
1901	866	+12.6%
1911	858	−0.9%
1921	824	−4.0%
1931	801	−2.8%
1936	899	+12.2%

Year	Pop.	±%
1951	1,075	+19.6%
1961	1,011	−6.0%
1971	735	−27.3%
1981	634	−13.7%
1991	643	+1.4%
2001	586	−8.9%
2011	580	−1.0%
2021	481	−17.1%

Source: ISTAT

=== Immigration ===
As of 2025, immigrants make up 4.3% of the population. The 5 largest foreign countries of birth are Romania, France, Poland, Morocco, and Albania.

== Twin towns - sister cities ==
- Fiorano Modenese, Italy
- Maranello, Italy
