= Benetutti =

Benetutti Benetuti (Sardinian)
- Comune
- Comune di Benetutti
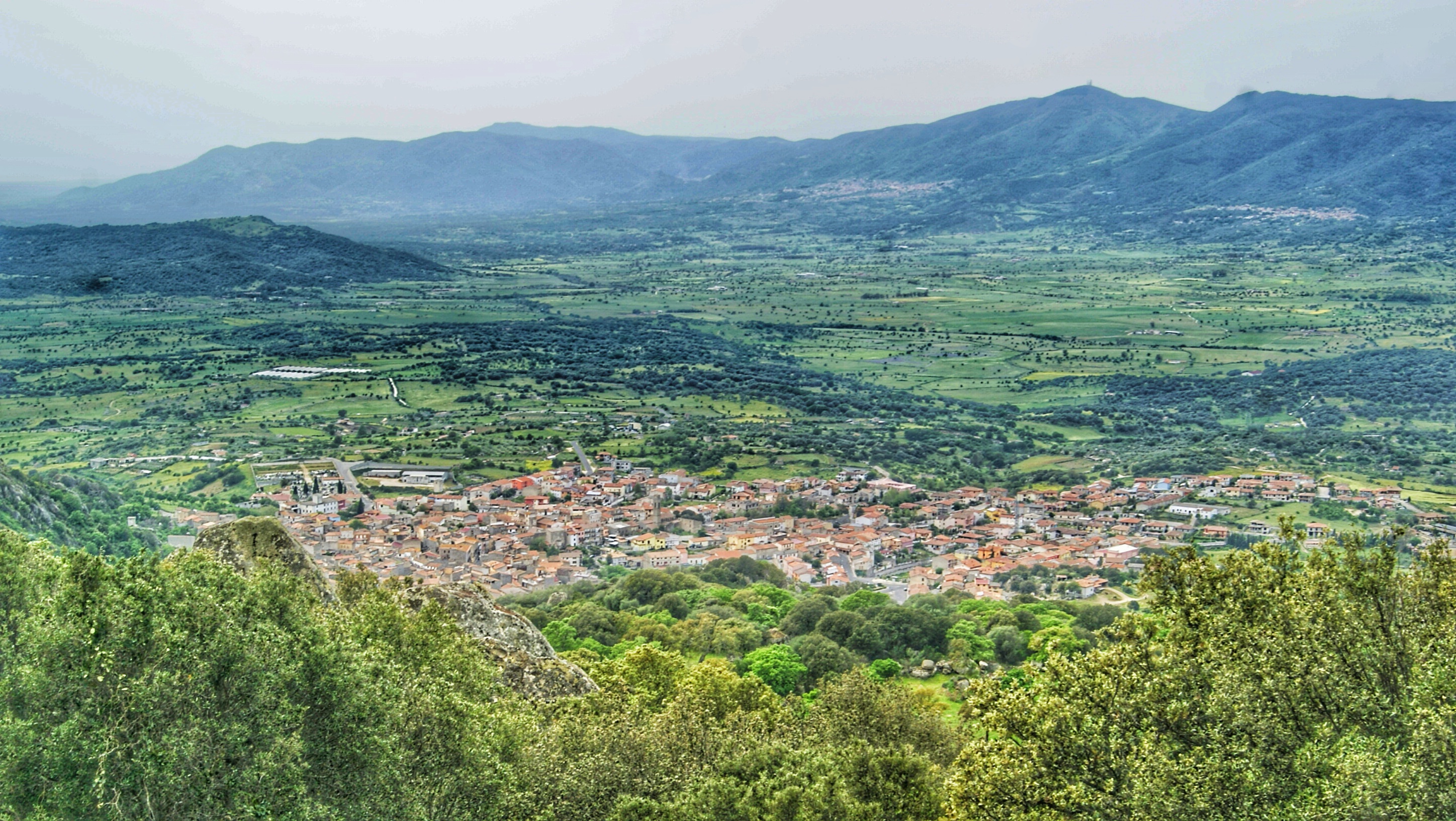
- View of Benetutti with the Goceano in the background.

- Coat of arms

- Location within Sardinia
- Coordinates: 40°27′N 9°10′E
- Country: Italy
- Region: Sardinia
- Metropolitan city: Sassari (SS)

Government
  - Mayor: Vincenzo Cosseddu

Area
  - Total: 94.45 km^{2} (36.47 sq mi)
- Elevation: 406 m (1,332 ft)

Population (2026)
  - Total: 1,623
  - Density: 17.18/km^{2} (44.51/sq mi)
- Demonym: Benetuttesi
- Time zone: UTC+1 (CET)
  - Summer (DST): UTC+2 (CEST)
- Postal code: 07010
- Dialing code: 079
- Patron saint: St. Helena
- Saint day: 18 August
- Website: Official website

Benetutti (Sardinian: Benetuti) is a town and comune (municipality) in the Metropolitan City of Sassari in the autonomous island region of Sardinia in Italy, located about 190 kilometres (120 mi) north of Cagliari and about 91 kilometres (57 mi) southeast of Sassari. It has 1,623 inhabitants.

Benetutti borders the municipalities of Bono, Bultei, Nule, Nuoro, Oniferi, Orani, Orune, and Pattada.

== History ==
Several prehistorical archaeological remains have been discovered in its countryside. These include Giants' tombs (Bronze Age mass graves), Domus de Janas (hypogaean Neolithic graves) and several nuraghi. An example of Roman ruins is the bath-pool on Saint Saturnino's hot springs. Benetutti's thermal sources have been famous since ancient times, and are probably related to the name of the village, which could come from the Sardinian bena 'e tottu, meaning "everyone's fountain".

In the main church hangs a 1549 painting by the "Maestro di Ozieri", Giovanni del Giglio, and assistants.

== Demographics ==
As of 2026, the population is 1,623, of which 48.7% are male, and 51.3% are female. Minors make up 11.4% of the population, and seniors make up 29.3%.

Historical population

Year	Pop.	±%
1861	1,850	—
1871	1,990	+7.6%
1881	2,195	+10.3%
1901	2,536	+15.5%
1911	2,642	+4.2%
1921	2,750	+4.1%
1931	2,766	+0.6%
1936	2,809	+1.6%

Year	Pop.	±%
1951	2,947	+4.9%
1961	3,016	+2.3%
1971	2,443	−19.0%
1981	2,367	−3.1%
1991	2,292	−3.2%
2001	2,181	−4.8%
2011	1,971	−9.6%
2021	1,726	−12.4%

Source: ISTAT

=== Immigration ===
As of 2025, immigrants make up 2.3% of the population. The 5 largest foreign countries of birth are Germany, Romania, China, France, and Poland.

== Notable people ==
- Francesco Cocco Ortu [it] (1842-1929), a minister of the Kingdom of Italy
