= Anela =

Anela Anèla (Sardinian)
- Comune
- Comune di Anela
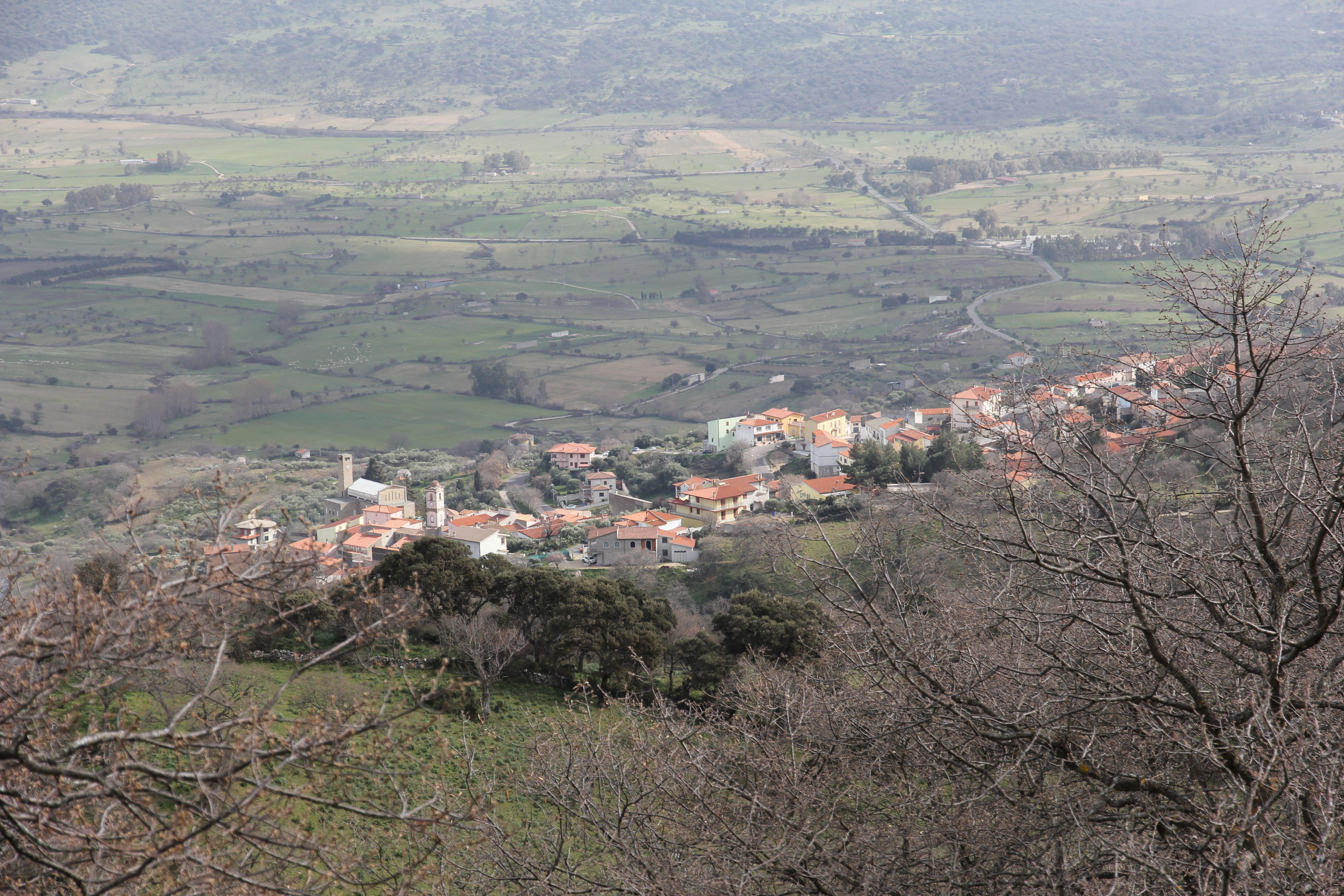
- View of Anela

- Location of Anela in Sardinia
- Coordinates: 40°26′N 9°3′E
- Country: Italy
- Region: Sardinia
- Metropolitan city: Sassari

Government
  - Mayor: Giangiuseppe Nurra

Area
  - Total: 36.89 km^{2} (14.24 sq mi)
- Elevation: 446 m (1,463 ft)

Population (2026)
  - Total: 553
  - Density: 15.0/km^{2} (38.8/sq mi)
- Demonym: Anelesi
- Time zone: UTC+1 (CET)
  - Summer (DST): UTC+2 (CEST)
- Postal code: 07010
- Dialing code: 079

Anela (Sardinian: Anèla) is a village and comune (municipality) in the Metropolitan City of Sassari in the autonomous island region of Sardinia in Italy, located about 140 kilometres (87 mi) north of Cagliari and about 50 kilometres (31 mi) southeast of Sassari. It has 553 inhabitants.

Anela, the oldest village of the historical region of Goceano, is known for Forest'Anela an holm oak woods very popular for trekking tourism and Domus de Janas Sos Furrighesos.

Anela borders the municipalities of Bono, Bultei, and Nughedu San Nicolò.

== Demographics ==
As of 2026, the population is 553, of which 51.4% are male, and 48.6% are female. Minors make up 10.5% of the population, and seniors make up 35.8%.

Historical population

Year	Pop.	±%
1861	589	—
1871	605	+2.7%
1881	731	+20.8%
1901	962	+31.6%
1911	1,101	+14.4%
1921	1,204	+9.4%
1931	1,273	+5.7%
1936	1,300	+2.1%

Year	Pop.	±%
1951	1,445	+11.2%
1961	1,485	+2.8%
1971	1,073	−27.7%
1981	1,065	−0.7%
1991	939	−11.8%
2001	817	−13.0%
2011	673	−17.6%
2021	588	−12.6%

Source: ISTAT

=== Immigration ===
As of 2025, immigrants make up 4.6% of the population. The 5 largest foreign countries of birth are Romania, France, Argentina, Belgium, and Germany.
