= Bonorva =

Bonorva Bonòlva (Sardinian)
- Comune
- Comune di Bonorva
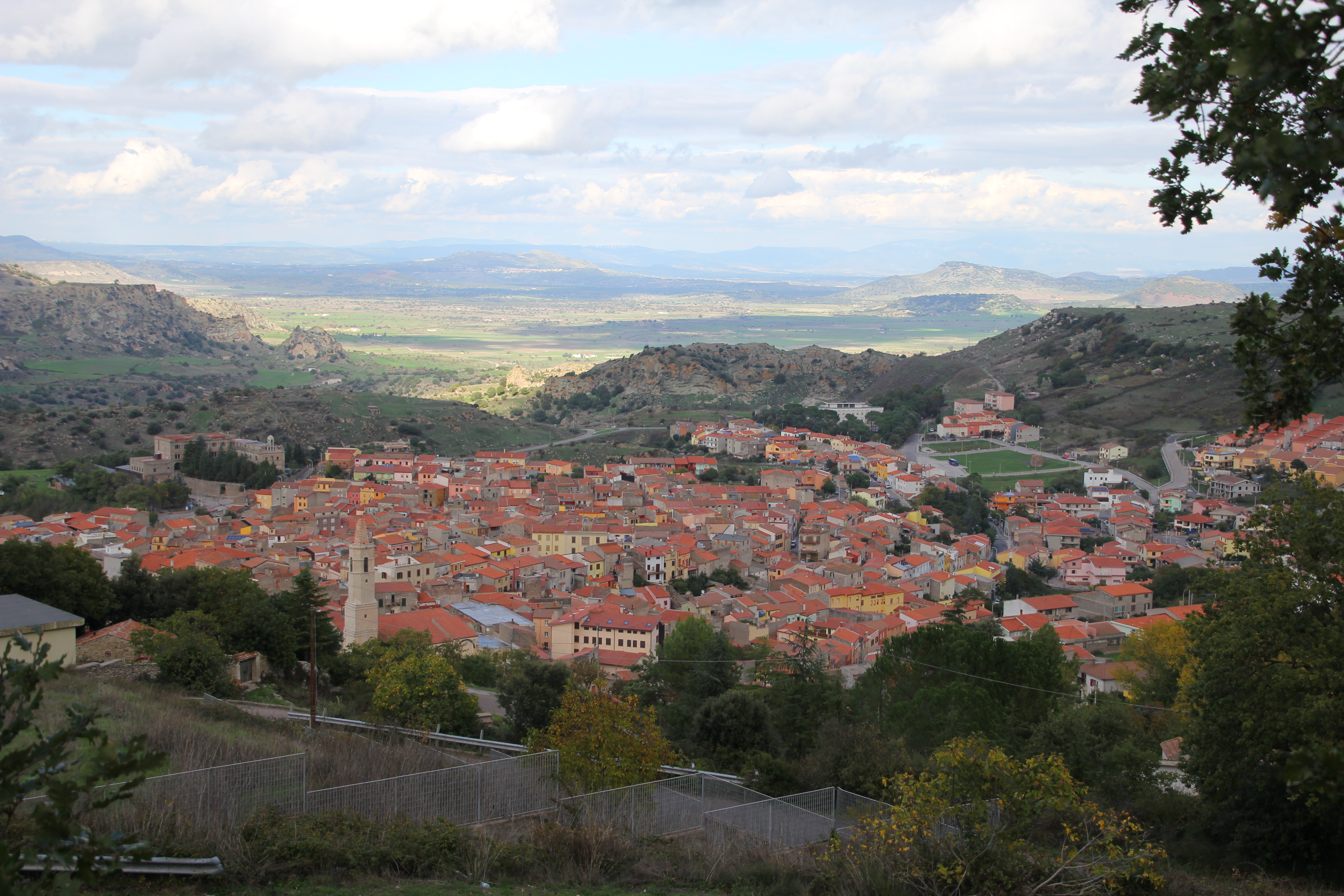
- View of Bonorva

- Coat of arms

- Location within Sardinia
- Coordinates: 40°25′N 8°46′E
- Country: Italy
- Region: Sardinia
- Metropolitan city: Sassari (SS)
- Frazioni: Rebeccu

Government
  - Mayor: Massimo D'Agostino

Area
  - Total: 149.75 km^{2} (57.82 sq mi)
- Elevation: 508 m (1,667 ft)

Population (2026)
  - Total: 3,030
  - Density: 20.2/km^{2} (52.4/sq mi)
- Demonym: Bonorvesi
- Time zone: UTC+1 (CET)
  - Summer (DST): UTC+2 (CEST)
- Postal code: 07012
- Dialing code: 079
- Website: Official website

Bonorva (Sardinian: Bonòlva) is a town and comune (municipality) in the Metropolitan City of Sassari in the autonomous island region of Sardinia in Italy, located about 140 kilometres (87 mi) north of Cagliari and about 40 kilometres (25 mi) southeast of Sassari. It has 3,030 inhabitants.

Bonorva borders the municipalities of Bolotana, Bono, Bottidda, Cossoine, Giave, Illorai, Ittireddu, Macomer, Mores, Nughedu San Nicolò, Semestene, and Torralba.

== Demographics ==
As of 2026, the population is 3,030, of which 50.9% are male, and 49.1% are female. Minors make up 10.9% of the population, and seniors make up 31.3%.

Historical population

Year	Pop.	±%
1861	5,232	—
1871	5,394	+3.1%
1881	5,966	+10.6%
1901	6,711	+12.5%
1911	7,128	+6.2%
1921	6,953	−2.5%
1931	7,341	+5.6%
1936	7,443	+1.4%

Year	Pop.	±%
1951	7,590	+2.0%
1961	6,669	−12.1%
1971	5,479	−17.8%
1981	5,045	−7.9%
1991	4,632	−8.2%
2001	4,106	−11.4%
2011	3,669	−10.6%
2021	3,231	−11.9%

Source: ISTAT

=== Immigration ===
As of 2025, immigrants make up 4.4% of the population. The 5 largest foreign countries of birth are Argentina, Romania, Albania, France, and Germany.
