= Fiorano Modenese =

Italian comune

- Comune
- Comune di Fiorano Modenese
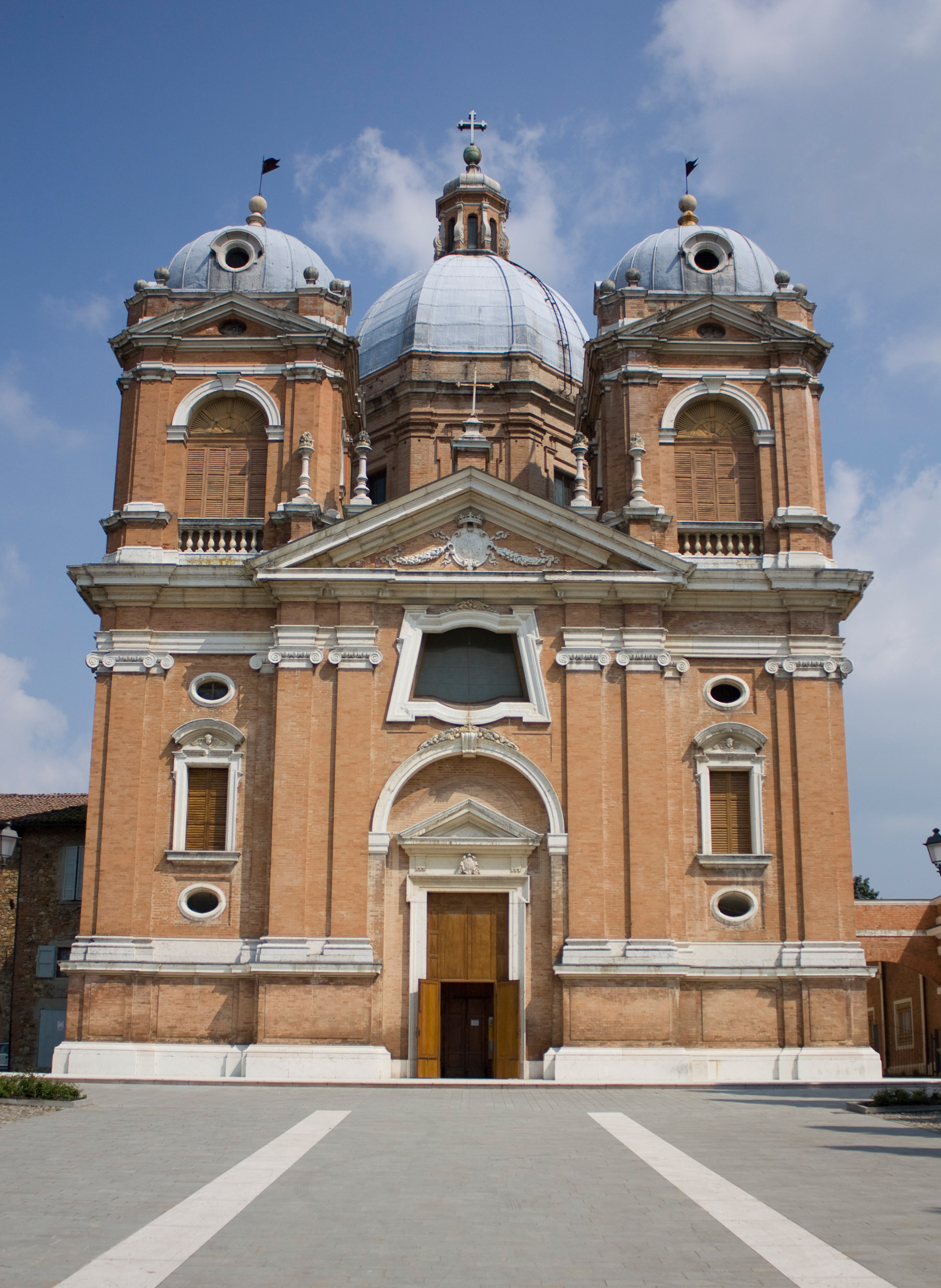
- Sanctuary of Beata Vergine del Castello.

- Coat of arms

- Location within Italy Location within Emilia-Romagna
- Coordinates: 44°32′N 10°49′E
- Country: Italy
- Region: Emilia-Romagna
- Province: Modena (MO)

Government
  - Mayor: Marco Biagini (PD)

Area
  - Total: 26.23 km^{2} (10.13 sq mi)
- Elevation: 115 m (377 ft)

Population (31 March 2017)
  - Total: 17,005
  - Density: 648.3/km^{2} (1,679/sq mi)
- Demonym: Fioranesi
- Time zone: UTC+1 (CET)
  - Summer (DST): UTC+2 (CEST)
- Postal code: 41042
- Dialing code: 0536
- Patron saint: St. John the Baptist
- Saint day: September 8
- Website: Official website

Fiorano Modenese (Modenese: Fiurân) is a comune (municipality) in the province of Modena in the Italian region Emilia-Romagna, located about 45 kilometres (28 mi) west of Bologna and about 15 kilometres (9 mi) southwest of Modena. Neighboring municipalities are Formigine, Sassuolo, Serramazzoni, Maranello.

Ferrari's private testing track, the Fiorano Circuit is located on the border with Maranello.

== Main sights ==
- Castle of Spezzano, noted from 11th century. It includes a frescoed gallery with scenes of battles fought by duke Alfonso I d'Este (1527-1531). At the lower floor is a hall with mid-16th century landscapes commissioned by Marco III Pio. A pentagonal tower once housed a prison and is now housed as a communal vinegar store.
- Sanctuary of the Beata Vergine del Castello di Fiorano
- Parish church of San Giovanni Battista
- Oratorio di San Rocco, Spezzano
- Museum of Ceramic
- Church of San Lorenzo, Nirano
- Salse of Nirano
- Theater Astoria
- Villas: Villa Campori, Villa Pace, Villa Guastalla, Villa Coccapani, Villa Cuoghi, Villa Messori.
- Municipal vinegar factory

== Districts ==
The municipality of Fiorano Modenese is divided on 4 districts: Fiorano Modenese, Spezzano, Ubersetto and Nirano.

== Twin towns ==
- Nardò, Italy
- San Donato di Ninea, Italy
- Ozieri, Italy
- Burgos, Italy
- Bultei, Italy
- Onda, Spain
