= Nughedu San Nicolò =

Nughedu San Nicolò Nughedu Santu Nigola (Sardinian)
- Comune
- Comune di Nughedu San Nicolò
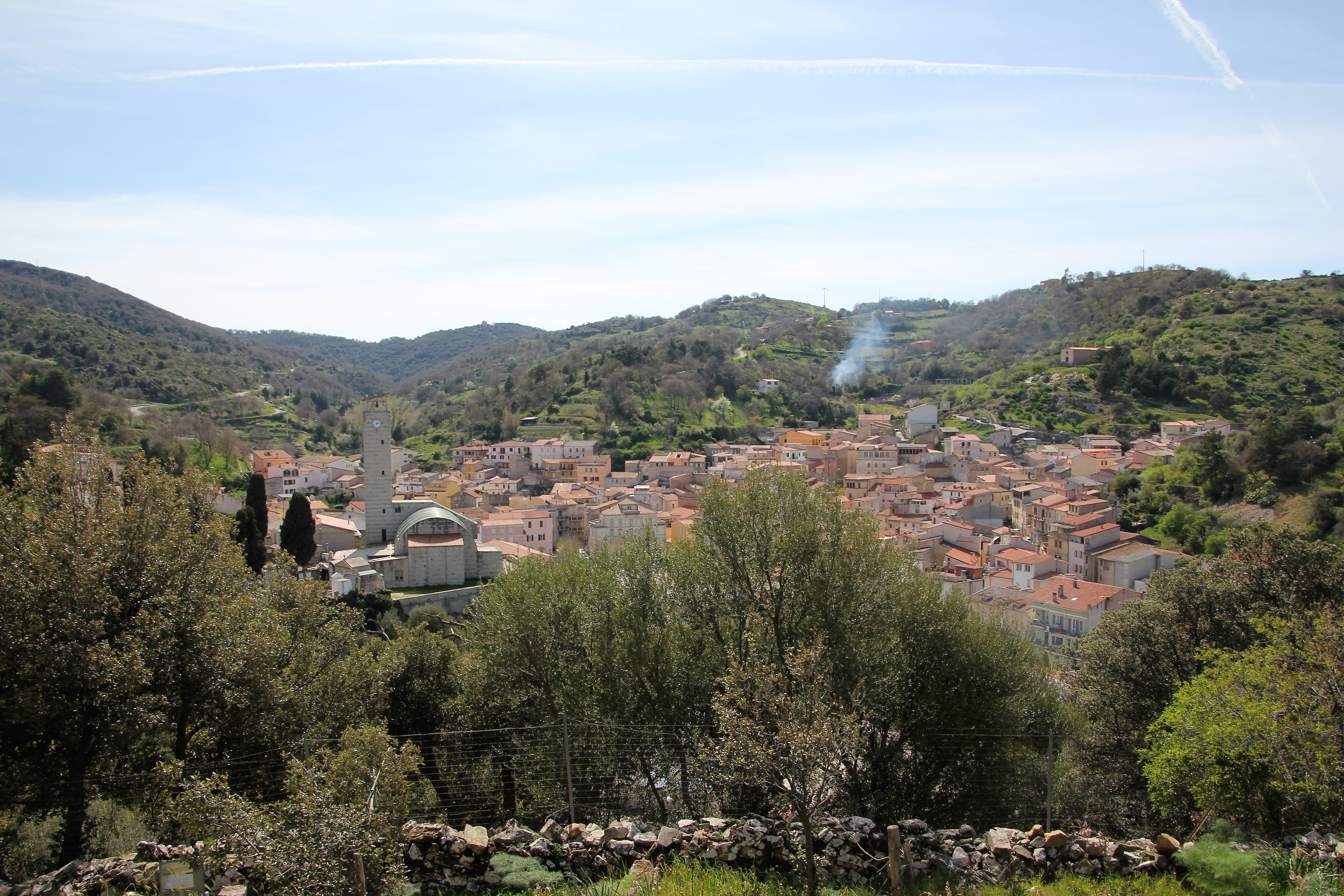
- View of Nughedu San Nicolò

- Location within Sardinia
- Coordinates: 40°46′N 8°31′E
- Country: Italy
- Region: Sardinia
- Metropolitan city: Sassari (SS)

Government
  - Mayor: Michele Carboni

Area
  - Total: 67.89 km^{2} (26.21 sq mi)
- Elevation: 577 m (1,893 ft)

Population (2026)
  - Total: 710
  - Density: 10/km^{2} (27/sq mi)
- Demonym: Nughedesi
- Time zone: UTC+1 (CET)
  - Summer (DST): UTC+2 (CEST)
- Postal code: 07010
- Dialing code: 079
- Website: Official website

Nughedu San Nicolò (Sardinian: Nughedu Santu Nigola) is a village and comune (municipality) in the Metropolitan City of Sassari in the autonomous island region of Sardinia in Italy, located about 180 kilometres (112 miles) northwest of Cagliari and about 50 kilometres (31 miles) southeast of Sassari. It has 710 inhabitants.

Nughedu San Nicolò borders the municipalities of Anela, Bono, Bonorva, Bultei, Ittireddu, Ozieri, and Pattada.

== Demographics ==
As of 2026, the population is 710, of which 51.3% are male, and 48.7% are female. Minors make up 8.7% of the population, and seniors make up 34.6%.

Historical population

Year	Pop.	±%
1861	1,596	—
1871	1,554	−2.6%
1881	1,740	+12.0%
1901	2,016	+15.9%
1911	2,387	+18.4%
1921	2,126	−10.9%
1931	2,286	+7.5%
1936	2,313	+1.2%

Year	Pop.	±%
1951	2,268	−1.9%
1961	2,001	−11.8%
1971	1,614	−19.3%
1981	1,406	−12.9%
1991	1,173	−16.6%
2001	1,017	−13.3%
2011	874	−14.1%
2021	763	−12.7%

Source: ISTAT

=== Immigration ===
As of 2025, immigrants make up 5.0% of the population. The 5 largest foreign countries of birth are Romania, Albania, Argentina, France, and Austria.
