= San Lorenzo, Nirano =

Church in Emilia-Romagna, Italy

Coordinates: 44°30′07.3″N 10°48′43.4″E

San Lorenzo is a Roman Catholic parish church at Via Chiesa #5 at the frazione of Nirano, in the commune of Fiorano Modenese, in the region of Emilia-Romagna, Italy.

== History ==
A church at the site is first documented in 1078. It was rebuilt in 1444 as documented by an inscription in the church. Again rebuilt in 1780, and restore in the 19th century. The apse has a painting depicting the Madonna and Child with Saints Lawrence, Catherine, Bernard, Andrea, and Bernardino of Siena by a 17th-century Bolognese artist.
