= Oratorio di San Rocco, Spezzano =

Church building in Spezzano, Italy

The Oratorio di San Rocco (Oratory of St Roch) is a Roman Catholic oratory located in the frazione of Spezzano, in the commune of Fiorano Modenese, in the region of Emilia-Romagna, Italy.

== History ==
The oratory was moved near its original location, to the present site in 1909. At one time, the neighborhood had the name of borgata di San Rocco due to the oratory. The oratory was erected after the plague of 1501 ebbed in Spezzano. In 1605, the community ceded the adjacent house to the Servite order, for them to found a convent for some years.

The oratory houses a polychrome scagliola altar frame with a 17th-century canvas depicting the Madonna and Child, with Saints Roch and Anthony Abbot by a painter of the Bolognese school.
