= Osidda =

Osidda Osidde (Sardinian)
- Comune
- Comune di Osidda
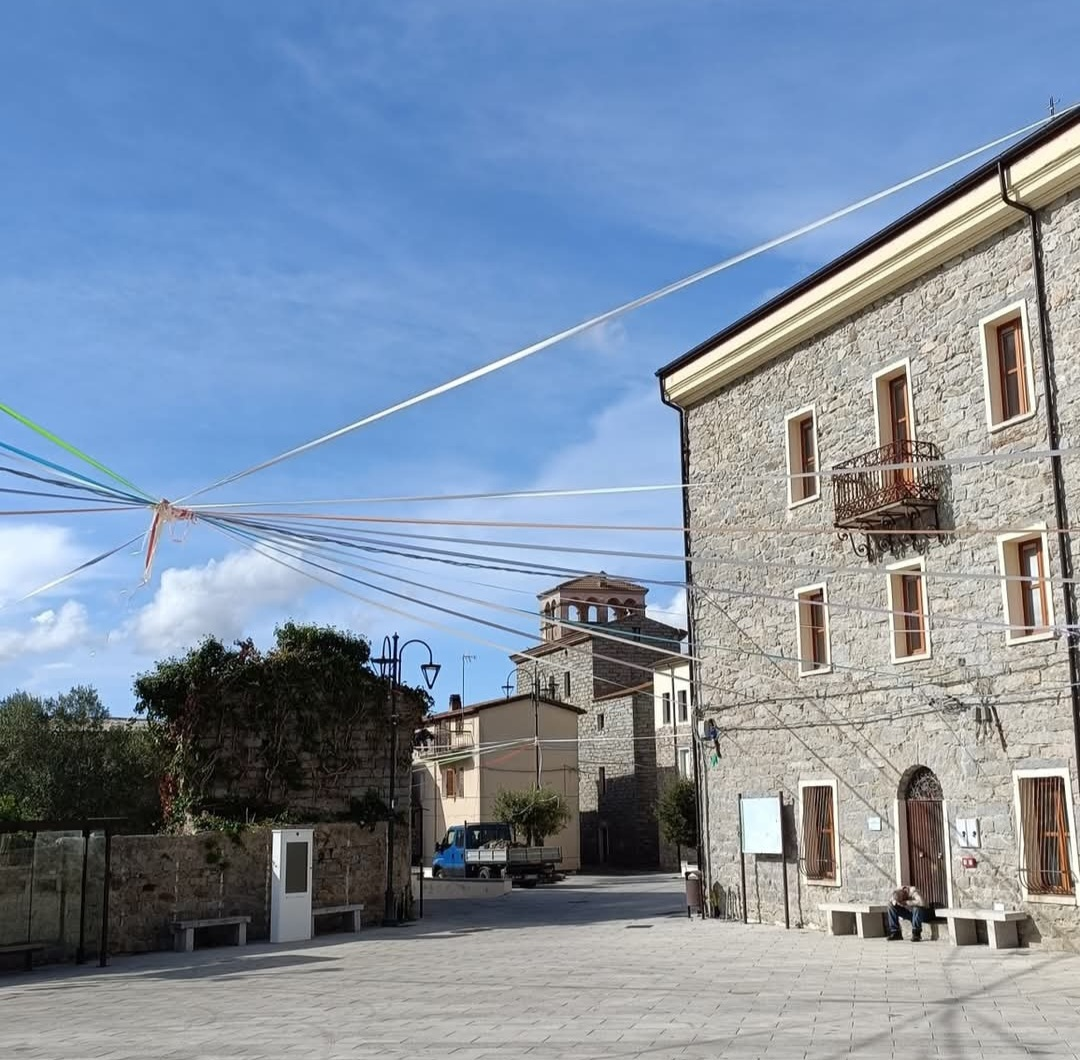
- Center of Osidda

- Location within Sardinia
- Coordinates: 40°31′N 9°13′E
- Country: Italy
- Region: Sardinia
- Province: Nuoro (NU)

Government
  - Mayor: Giovanni Mossa

Area
  - Total: 25.68 km^{2} (9.92 sq mi)
- Elevation: 650 m (2,130 ft)

Population (2026)
  - Total: 209
  - Density: 8.14/km^{2} (21.1/sq mi)
- Time zone: UTC+1 (CET)
  - Summer (DST): UTC+2 (CEST)
- Postal code: 08020
- Dialing code: 079
- Website: Official website

Osidda (Sardinian: Osidde) is a village and comune (municipality) in the Province of Nuoro in the autonomous island region of Sardinia in Italy, located about 140 kilometres (87 mi) north of Cagliari and about 25 kilometres (16 mi) northwest of Nuoro. It has 209 inhabitants.

Osidda borders the municipalities of Bitti, Buddusò, Nule, and Pattada.

== Demographics ==
As of 2026, the population is 209, of which 49.3% are male, and 50.7% are female. Minors make up 15.8% of the population, and seniors make up 28.7%.

Historical population

Year	Pop.	±%
1861	423	—
1871	468	+10.6%
1881	493	+5.3%
1901	509	+3.2%
1911	575	+13.0%
1921	569	−1.0%
1931	606	+6.5%
1936	617	+1.8%

Year	Pop.	±%
1951	572	−7.3%
1961	514	−10.1%
1971	403	−21.6%
1981	358	−11.2%
1991	299	−16.5%
2001	266	−11.0%
2011	230	−13.5%
2021	219	−4.8%

Source: ISTAT

=== Immigration ===
As of 2025, immigrants make up 10.3% of the population. The 5 largest foreign countries of birth are Romania, Algeria, Belgium, Morocco, and Poland.
