= Resolza =

Traditional Sardinian folding knife

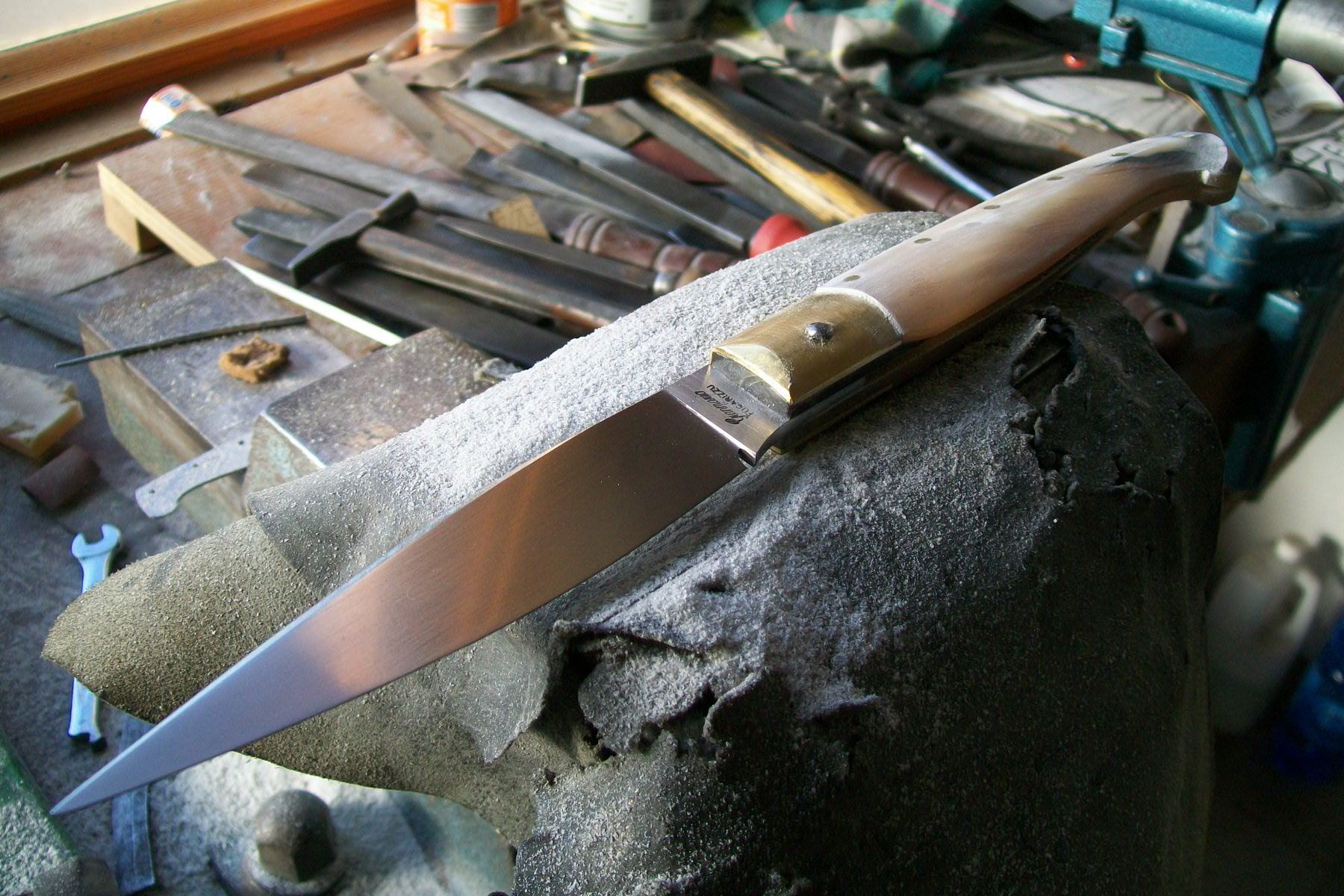
A typical knife from Pattada.

A typical knife from Arbus.

The resòlza, also known as resòrza, lesòrja, resòrja or arresòja, is a traditional Sardinian folding-blade fighting and utility knife. In Sardinia, this term is widely used to describe all foldable knives.

Like the straight razor, the resolza's blade folds into the handle when not in use. Although the blade traces its origins to the Nuragic civilization, since it has always served as a nearly indispensable tool for agro-pastoral work, the word's origin dates from around the 17th century: the term in Sardinian is derived from the Latin rasoria, which translates to "razor used for shaving".

Back in those times, the resolza was used as a habitual item of personal wear, assisting the herdsmen with their daily activities, rather than for defensive purposes. In the 18th century, many travellers visiting the island reported in fact that Sardinians (especially the society's most prominent members) generally carried either a dagger (sa daga) or a peculiar sabre on the belt (sa leppa de chintu) both to boost their social status and to dissuade others from any aggressive confrontation. The actual leppa was a 60 cm sword that has no Italian or European counterpart, with similar blades existing only in the Middle East and among some Berber tribes in North Africa.

Therefore, the leppa is not to be confused with the resolza knife, even though the latter eventually replaced the former by the 20th century, when the imposition of Italian laws restricting the carrying of dangerous tools first entered into force: while the usage of the sword began to decline, the resolza grew so much in popularity among Sardinians from any background and social class that the traditional knife is now also improperly called leppa.

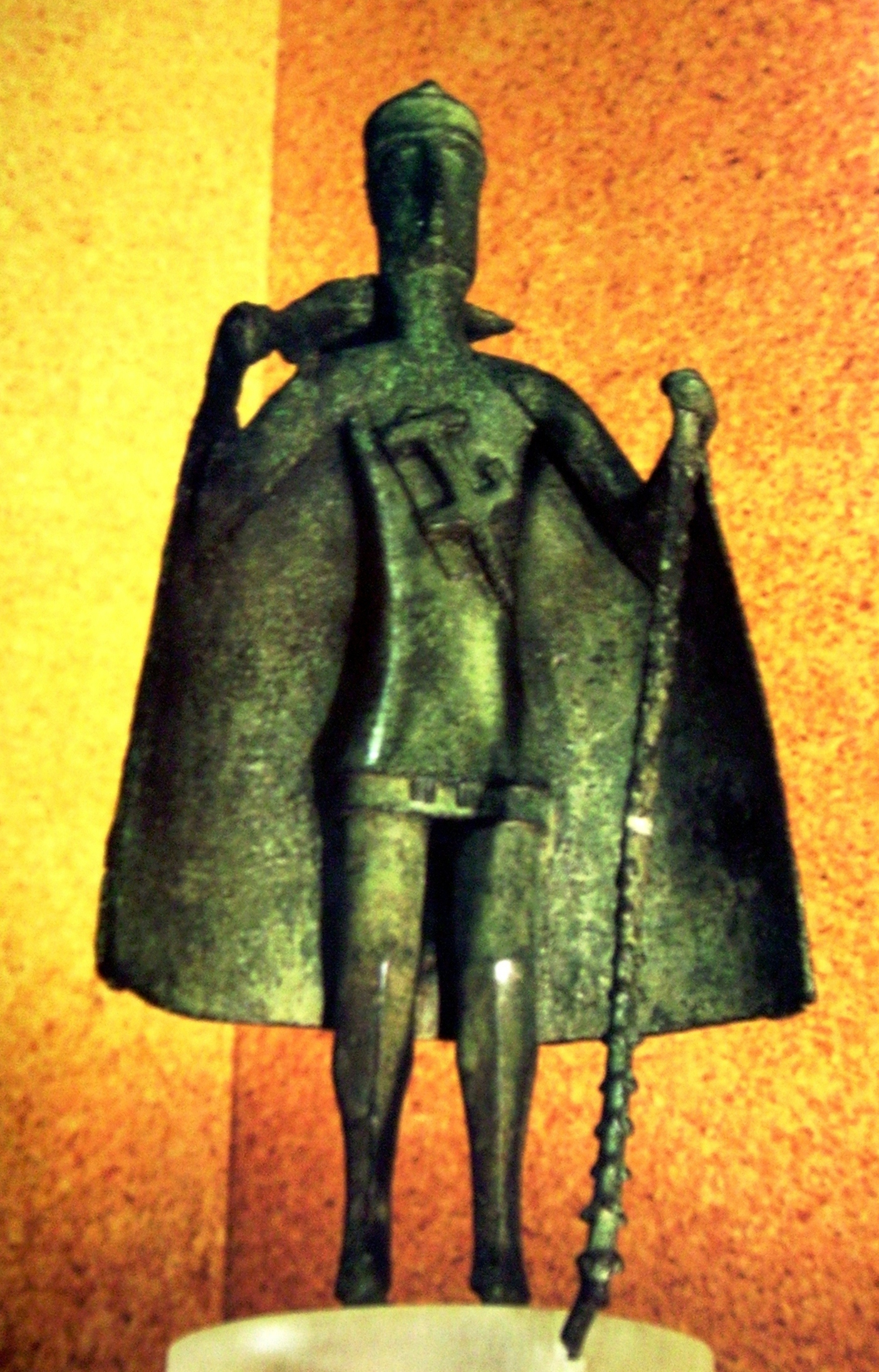
A Nuragic bronze statuette showing a village headman carrying a resolza-like dagger.

There are three main traditional patterns of the knife, with the most crucial characteristic coming from the shape of the blade: the Pattada-style knife, (resolza pattadesa), considered the most famous Sardinian knife, has a long and narrow blade meant to resemble a myrtle leaf (foza de murta), with the handle being made of muflon horn; the Arbus-style knife (arresoja arburesa) has a more pot-bellied blade that resembles a laurel leaf (folla de lauru) instead, while having a monolithic handle. The most distinctive, by their typical blunt blade, are the knives from Guspini (arresoja guspinesa) and the Gallurese ones from the villages of Luras (resorza lurisìnca) and Tempio Pausania (lametta tempiesa): these were designed to cope with the Italian laws that outlawed pointed blades, but were also useful for mining jobs and removing the cork.

Nowadays, in spite of the several forgeries produced by mainland Italian industries, the local craftsmanship has reached a high artistic expression and the handmade Sardinian knife in all its varieties is well-known, sought and particularly appreciated by collectors for its resistance and aesthetic flavour.
