= Monte Rasu =

Mountain in Italy

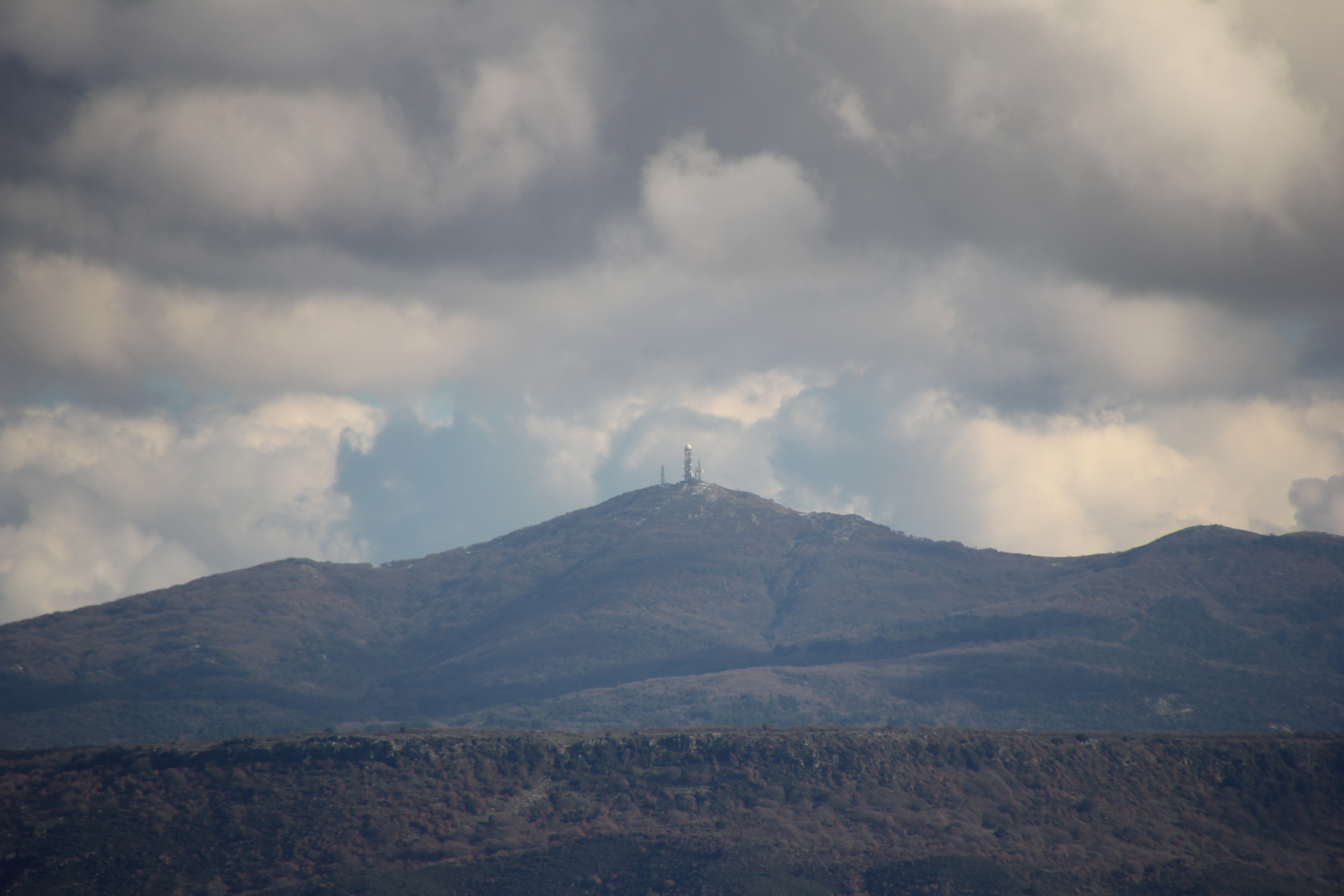
- Mount Rasu

Highest point
- Elevation: 1,259 m (4,131 ft)
- Prominence: 770 m (2,530 ft)
- Isolation: 40.1 km (24.9 mi)
- Coordinates: 40°25′19.87″N 9°0′23.92″E

Geography
- Location within Italy
- Location: Province of Sassari, Sardinia, Italy
- Parent range: Goceano

Monte Rasu is a mountain in the Goceano's range, in the province of Sassari, central west Sardinia, Italy. Its summit, called sa Punta Manna (1,259 m), is the highest peak in the province of Sassari.

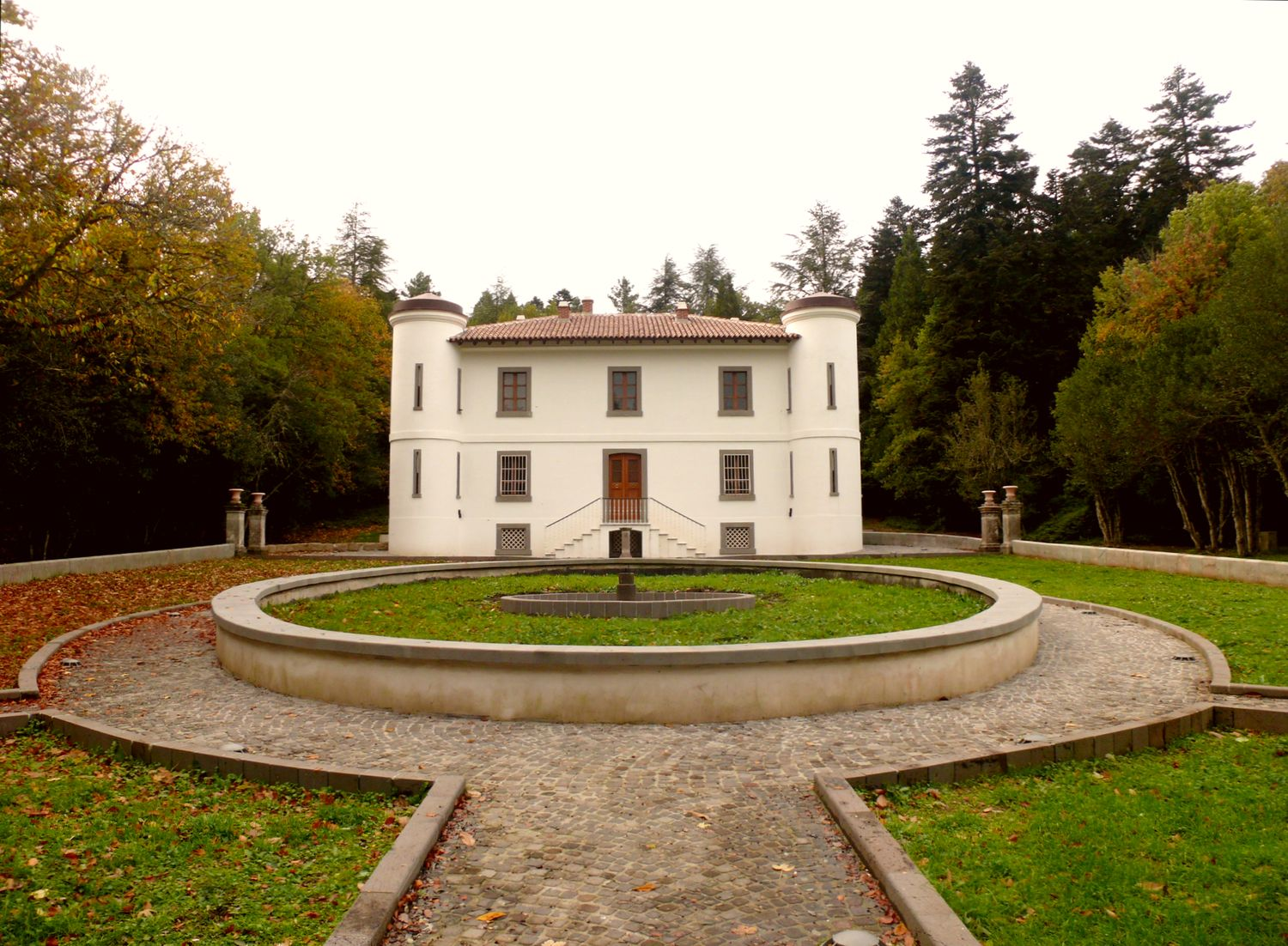
Villa Piercy in the forest of Badde Salighes.

The mount is surrounded by the woods of Foresta Burgos, Sos Niberos and Badde Salighes, characterized for the presence of thousand-year trees of holly and taxus baccata, and woods of downy oaks, chestnuts and holm oaks.

== Description ==
=== Origin and meaning of the name ===
The name of the mountain derives from the term "rasu" which, in the Sardinian language, indicates the morphological condition relating to the flattening of the relief or the lack of vegetation on its slopes.

=== Flora and fauna ===
Its slopes are covered with vast forests of downy oak (Quercus pubescens), European maple (Acer monspessulanum), chestnut trees (Castanea sativa) and holm oaks (Quercus ilex). Among these, the Nibberos forest should be mentioned; It is considered one of the largest forests of yew (Taxus baccata) and holly (Ilex aquifolium) in Italy and there are a large number of thousand-year-old specimens. At the top of the mountain there is a meteorological centre of the Agro-Meteorological Service of Sardinia equipped with a powerful radar.
