= Pattada =

Pattada Patada (Sardinian)
- Comune
- Comune di Pattada
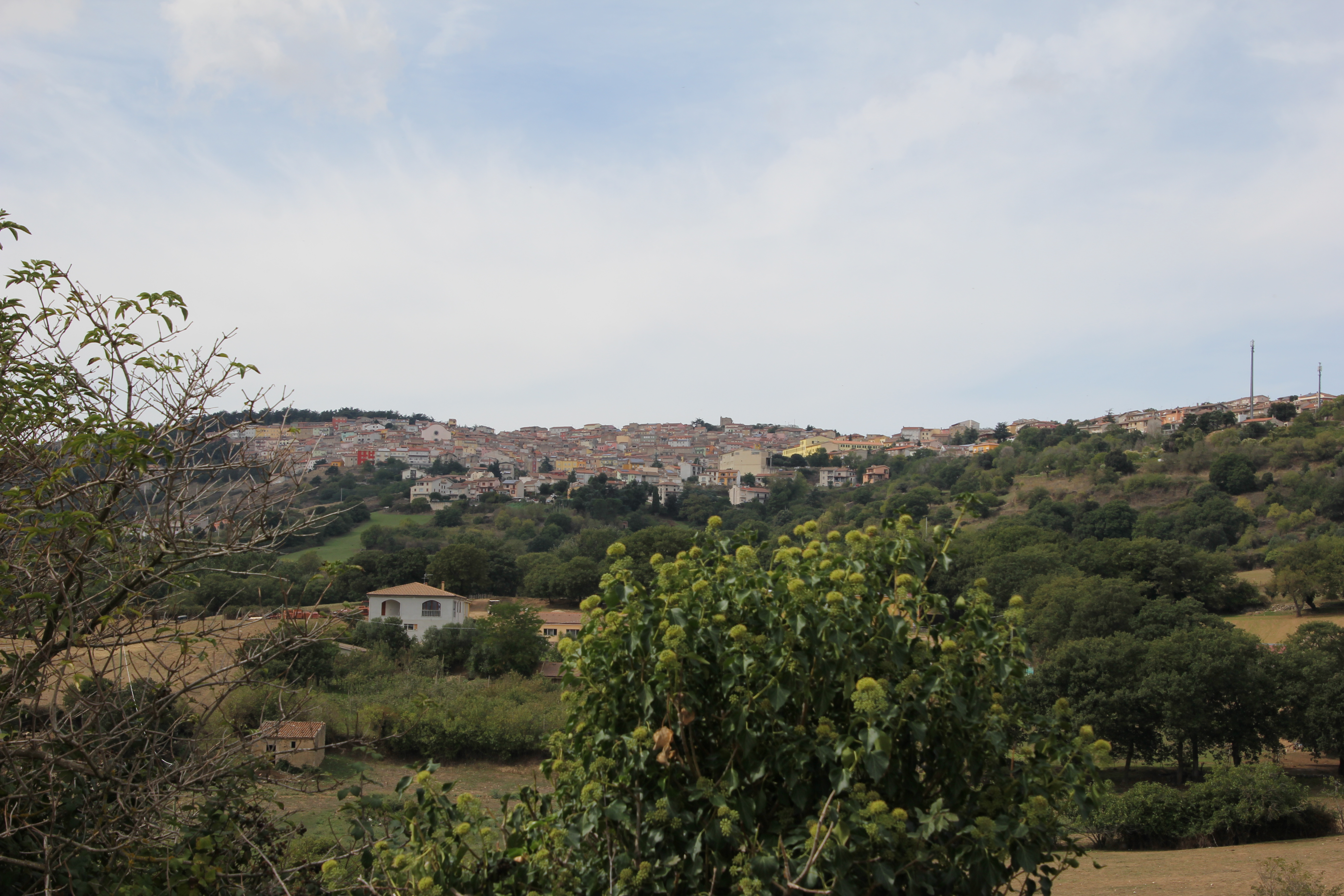
- View of Pattada from the west

- Location within Sardinia
- Coordinates: 40°35′N 9°7′E
- Country: Italy
- Region: Sardinia
- Metropolitan city: Sassari (SS)
- Frazioni: Bantine

Government
  - Mayor: Angelo Sini

Area
  - Total: 164.88 km^{2} (63.66 sq mi)
- Elevation: 778 m (2,552 ft)

Population (2026)
  - Total: 2,763
  - Density: 16.76/km^{2} (43.40/sq mi)
- Demonym(s): Pattadesi, Patadesos, Pathadesos
- Time zone: UTC+1 (CET)
  - Summer (DST): UTC+2 (CEST)
- Postal code: 07016
- Dialing code: 079
- Patron saint: St. Sabina
- Saint day: 29 August
- Website: Official website

Pattada (Sardinian: Patada) is a town and comune (municipality) in the Metropolitan City of Sassari in the autonomous island region of Sardinia in Italy, located about 150 kilometres (93 mi) north of Cagliari and about 50 kilometres (31 mi) southeast of Sassari. It has 2,763 inhabitants.

Pattada borders the municipalities of Benetutti, Buddusò, Bultei, Nughedu San Nicolò, Nule, Oschiri, Osidda, and Ozieri.

== Demographics ==
As of 2026, the population is 2,763, of which 51.0% are males, and 49.0% are females. Minors make up 13.4% of the population, and seniors make up 30.3%.

Historical population

Year	Pop.	±%
1861	3,580	—
1871	3,912	+9.3%
1881	4,125	+5.4%
1901	4,804	+16.5%
1911	5,302	+10.4%
1921	5,425	+2.3%
1931	5,255	−3.1%
1936	5,231	−0.5%

Year	Pop.	±%
1951	5,450	+4.2%
1961	5,156	−5.4%
1971	3,938	−23.6%
1981	3,766	−4.4%
1991	3,772	+0.2%
2001	3,513	−6.9%
2011	3,253	−7.4%
2021	2,892	−11.1%

Source: ISTAT

=== Immigration ===
As of 2025, immigrants make up 3.1% of the population. The 5 largest foreign countries of birth are Germany, France, Argentina, Romania, and Switzerland.

== Culture ==
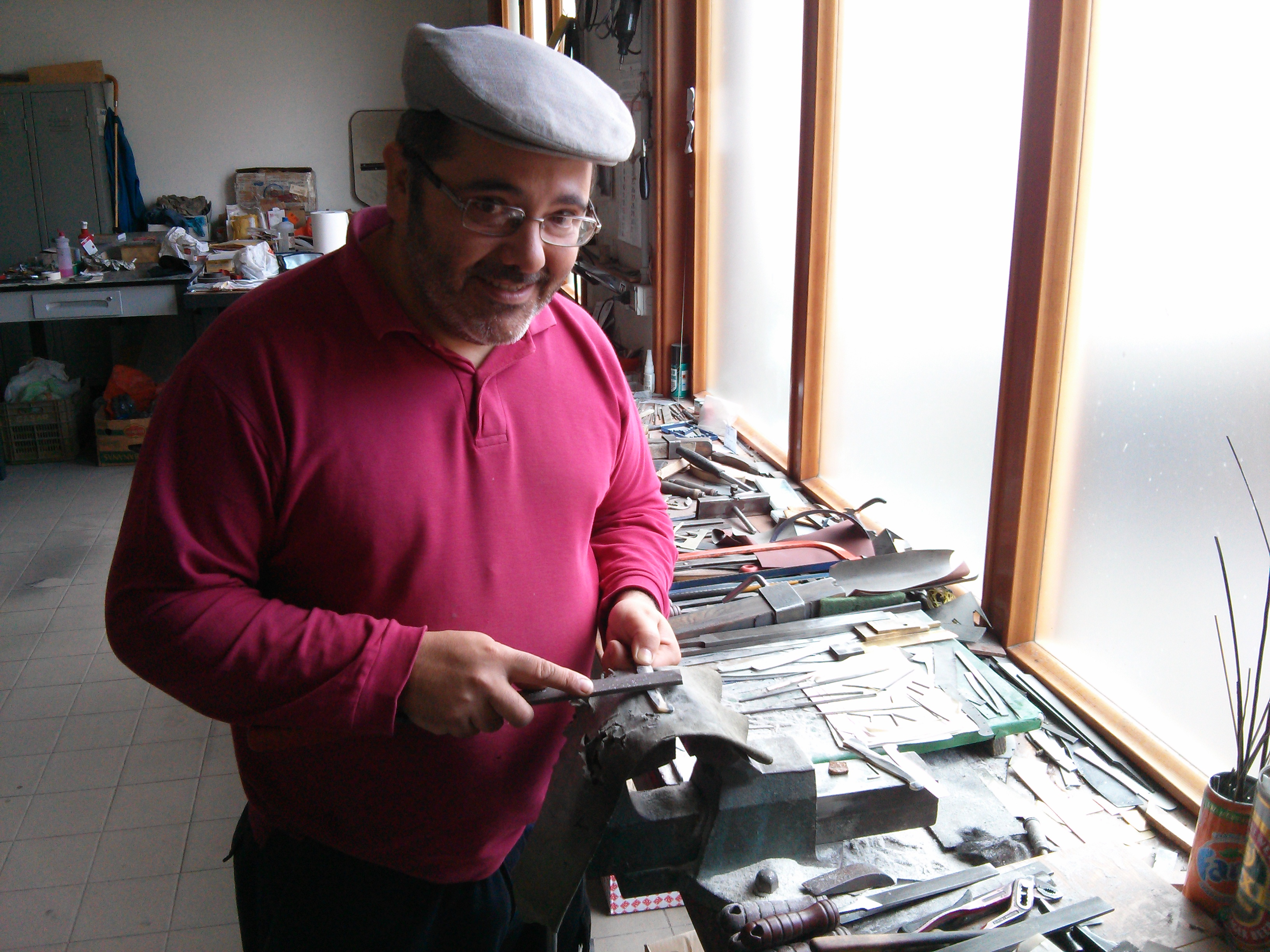
A craftsman making a knife in Pattada

Pattada is known for the production of Sardinian knives, called resolzas. There are numerous knife shops where local artisans produce these blades by hand. The resolza is a folding blade pocket knife. Other knives include fixed blade types used by shepherds. Most knives built in Pattada have handles made of ram or mouflon horn.

Some local luthiers gained a reputation for their products, mostly violins.

== Economy ==
Many Pattadese are engaged in the production of Pecorino Sardo cheese; the surrounding countryside is largely pasture. Ewes are raised for their milk, which is made into cheese at the local co-operative.
