= Bultei =

Bultei Urtei (Sardinian)
- Comune
- Comune di Bultei
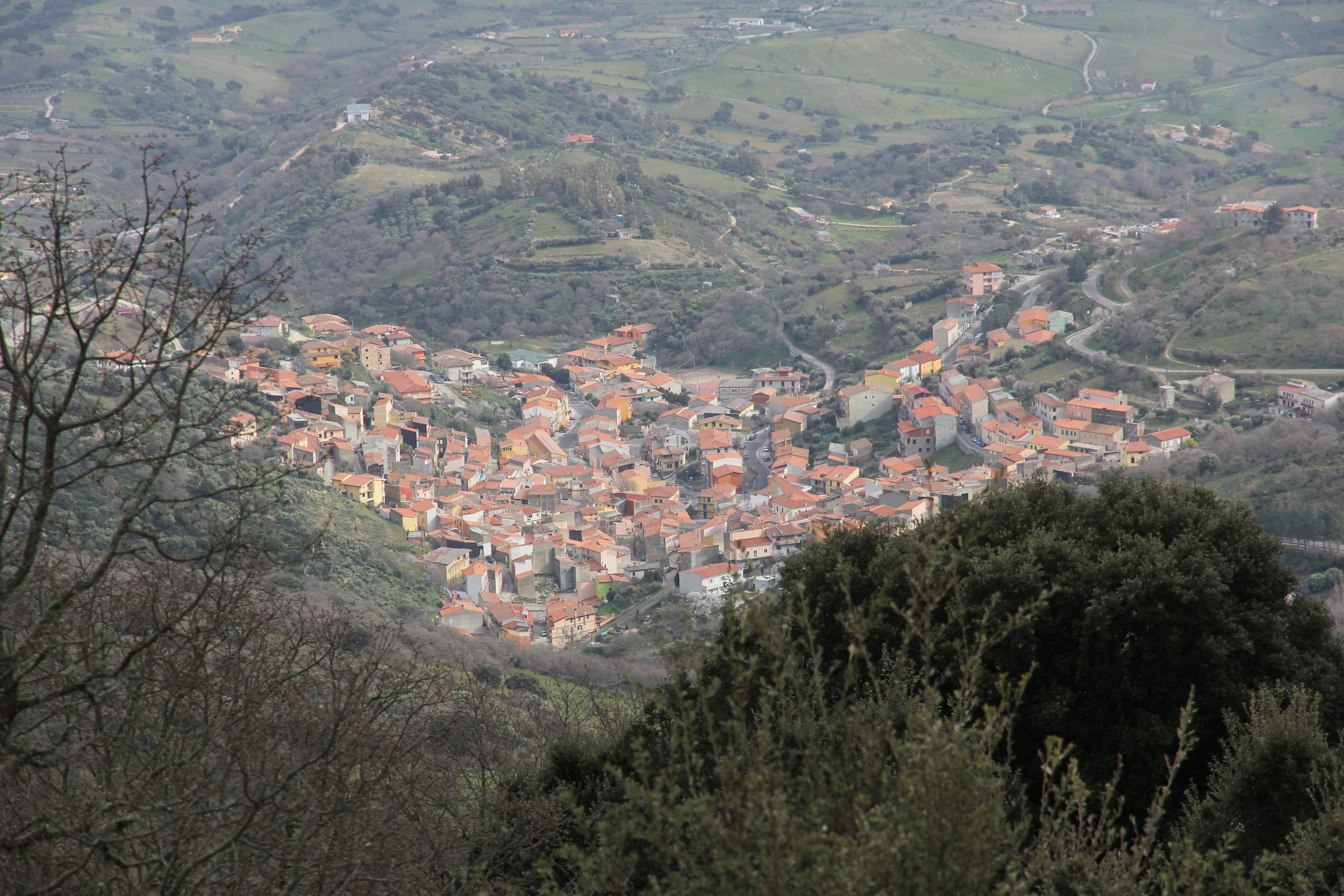
- View of Bultei

- Location within Sardinia
- Coordinates: 40°27′28″N 9°03′40″E
- Country: Italy
- Region: Sardinia
- Metropolitan city: Sassari (SS)

Government
  - Mayor: Francesco Fois

Area
  - Total: 96.83 km^{2} (37.39 sq mi)
- Elevation: 509 m (1,670 ft)

Population (2026)
  - Total: 776
  - Density: 8.01/km^{2} (20.8/sq mi)
- Demonym: Bulteini
- Time zone: UTC+1 (CET)
  - Summer (DST): UTC+2 (CEST)
- Postal code: 07010
- Dialing code: 079
- Website: Official website

Bultei (Sardinian: Urtei) is a village and comune (municipality) in the Metropolitan City of Sassari in the autonomous island region of Sardinia in Italy, located about 140 kilometres (87 mi) north of Cagliari and about 50 kilometres (31 mi) southeast of Sassari. It has 776 inhabitants.

Bultei borders the municipalities of Anela, Benetutti, Bono, Nughedu San Nicolò, and Pattada.

== Demographics ==
As of 2026, the population is 776, of which 48.8% are male, and 51.2% are female. Minors make up 10.1% of the population, and seniors make up 33.5%.

Historical population

Year	Pop.	±%
1861	1,017	—
1871	1,104	+8.6%
1881	1,160	+5.1%
1901	1,749	+50.8%
1911	2,021	+15.6%
1921	2,066	+2.2%
1931	2,352	+13.8%
1936	2,493	+6.0%

Year	Pop.	±%
1951	2,479	−0.6%
1961	2,363	−4.7%
1971	1,789	−24.3%
1981	1,621	−9.4%
1991	1,370	−15.5%
2001	1,206	−12.0%
2011	1,046	−13.3%
2021	841	−19.6%

Source: ISTAT

=== Immigration ===
As of 2025, immigrants make up 4.4% of the population. The 5 largest foreign countries of birth are Romania, Germany, Albania, Belgium, and the Dominican Republic.

== Twin towns - sister cities ==
- Fiorano Modenese, Italy
- Maranello, Italy, since 1986
