= Maranello =

- Comune
- Commune di Maranello
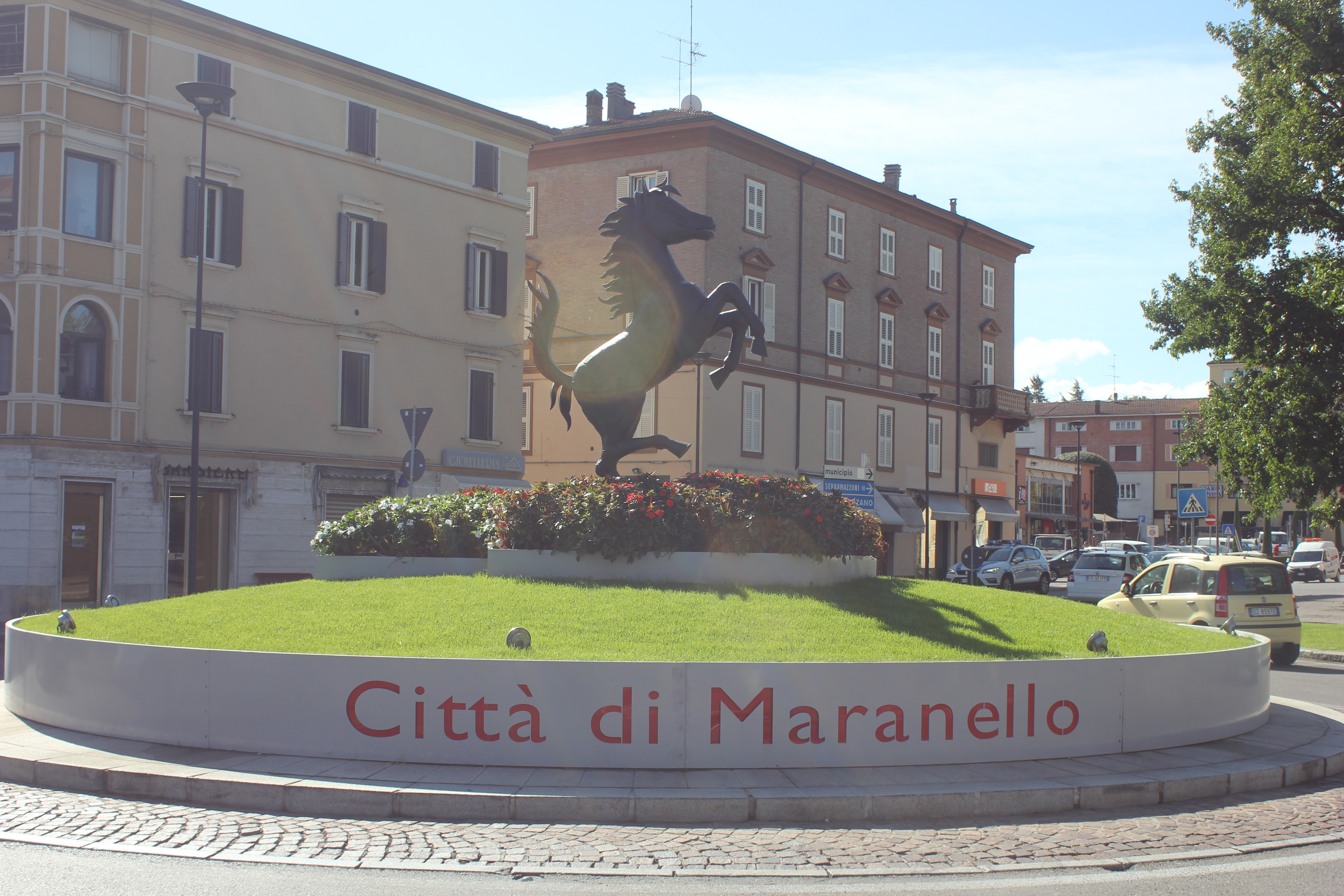
- The Prancing Horse, symbol of Ferrari, which has its headquarters in Maranello

- Coat of arms

- Location within Italy Location within Emilia-Romagna
- Coordinates: 44°31′35″N 10°52′00″E
- Country: Italy
- Region: Emilia-Romagna
- Province: Modena (MO)
- Frazioni: Bell'Italia, Fogliano, Gorzano, Pozza, San Venanzio, Torre delle Oche, Torre Maina

Government
  - Mayor: Luigi Zironi (PD)

Area
  - Total: 32 km^{2} (12 sq mi)
- Elevation: 137 m (449 ft)

Population (30 September 2017)
  - Total: 17,504
  - Density: 550/km^{2} (1,400/sq mi)
- Demonym: Maranellesi
- Time zone: UTC+1 (CET)
  - Summer (DST): UTC+2 (CEST)
- Postal code: 41053
- Dialing code: 0536
- Patron saint: Saint Blaise
- Website: www.comune.maranello.mo.it

Maranello (Modenese: Maranèl) is a city of Italy in the province of Modena, in the region of Emilia-Romagna, 18 km from Modena, with a population of 17,504 as of 2017. It is known worldwide as the home of Ferrari and the Formula One racing team, Scuderia Ferrari. Maranello was also home to coachbuilding firm Carrozzeria Scaglietti, owned by Ferrari.

== Ferrari Spa ==
Maranello has been the location of the Ferrari factory since the early 1940s. During World War II, Enzo Ferrari transferred to Modena, ending its ownership of Alfa Romeo. Initially, Ferrari's factory in Maranello was shared with Auto Avio Costruzioni, a machine tool manufacturing business started by Enzo to tide the company over while Alfa Romeo's ban on Enzo Ferrari making cars bearing the Ferrari name was in force. Maranello also houses the Museo Ferrari public museum, collecting sports cars, racing cars and trophies.

== Haas F1 ==
American Haas F1 Team's design team is based in Maranello. Haas's design team is led by technical director Andrea De Zordo, who oversees Haas's R&D functions, including the Aerodynamics and CFD departments. Since the team's inception, Haas has maintained a close technical collaboration with Maranello based Scuderia Ferrari. Haas's current car utilizes, among other things, a Ferrari power unit, steering, and transmission.

== Main sights ==
Maranello's new town library was designed jointly by Andrea Maffei and Isozaki. The library opened in 2012. The parish church of San Biagio was rebuilt in 1903.

Its new library opened in November 2011, and was designed by Arata Isozaki and Andrea Maffei.

Maranello is the starting point of the annual Italian Marathon, which finishes in nearby Carpi.

The Maranello track has a yearly marathon going around the Ferrari track and factory, with having different lengths for different levels.

== People ==
- Enzo Ferrari (1898–1988), Italian car driver and founder of Ferrari (company)
- Umberto Masetti (1926–2006), Italian World Champion Grand Prix motorcycle racer
- Michael Schumacher (1969), German F1 racer and honorary citizen of Maranello
- Edinson Cavani (1987), Uruguayan footballer of Italian descent from Maranello

== Twin towns ==
- Ozieri, Italy, since 1986
- Ittireddu, Italy, since 1986
- Bultei, Italy, since 1986
- Burgos, Italy, since 1986
- Termini Imerese, Italy, since 1986
