= San Biagio, Maranello =

Roman Catholic parish church located in Emilia-Romagna, Italy

San Biagio is Roman Catholic parish church located at Via Nazionale #37 in the town of Maranello, near Sassuolo, in the region of Emilia-Romagna, Italy.

== History ==
A church at the site is recalled in documents from 1375 from the Abbey of Marola. To erect the church, some of the walls of the local castle were used, and the entrance formerly required entry through an ancient gate of the castle with a drawbridge. The church has presently a Gothic revival-style facade with roofline spires, and was built between 1894 and 1903. The Belltower was built over the next decade.
