= Orune =

- Comune
- Comune di Orune
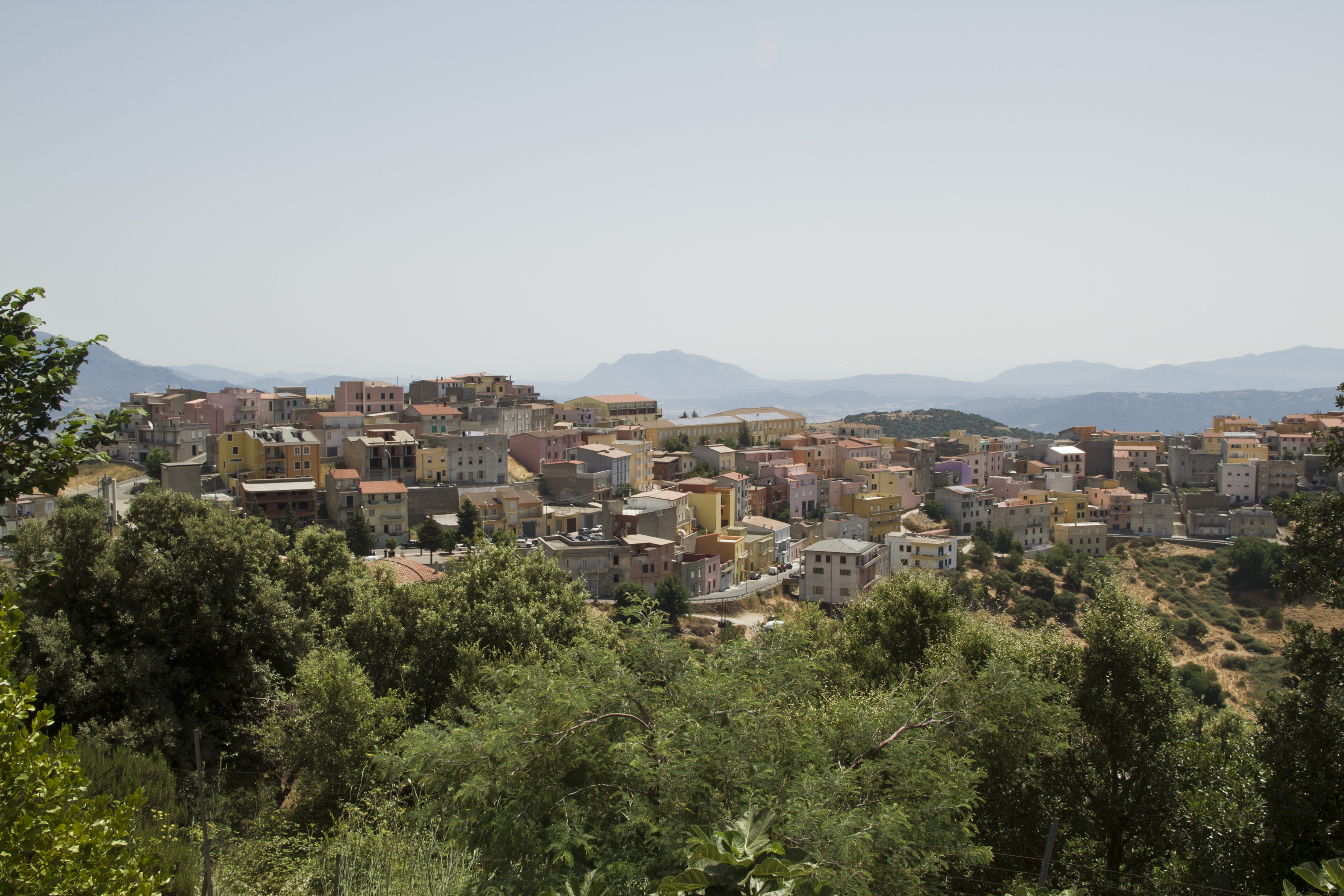
- View of Orune

- Location within Sardinia
- Coordinates: 40°25′N 9°22′E
- Country: Italy
- Region: Sardinia
- Province: Nuoro (NU)

Government
  - Mayor: Pietro Deiana

Area
  - Total: 128.45 km^{2} (49.59 sq mi)
- Elevation: 745 m (2,444 ft)

Population (2026)
  - Total: 2,022
  - Density: 15.74/km^{2} (40.77/sq mi)
- Demonym: Orunesi
- Time zone: UTC+1 (CET)
  - Summer (DST): UTC+2 (CEST)
- Postal code: 08020
- Dialing code: 0784
- Website: Official website

Orune (Sardinian: Orùne) is a town and comune (municipality) in the Province of Nuoro in the autonomous island region of Sardinia in Italy, located about 130 kilometres (81 mi) north of Cagliari and about 11 kilometres (7 mi) north of Nuoro. It has 2,022 inhabitants.

Orune borders the municipalities of Benetutti, Bitti, Dorgali, Lula, Nule, and Nuoro.

== Demographics ==
As of 2026, the population is 2,022, of which 50.0% are male, and 50.0% are female. Minors make up 12.1% of the population, and seniors make up 29.9%.

Historical population

| Year | Pop. | ±% |
|---|---|---|
| 1861 | 2,010 | — |
| 1871 | 2,199 | +9.4% |
| 1881 | 2,421 | +10.1% |
| 1901 | 3,148 | +30.0% |
| 1911 | 3,526 | +12.0% |
| 1921 | 3,775 | +7.1% |
| 1931 | 4,365 | +15.6% |
| 1936 | 4,491 | +2.9% |

| Year | Pop. | ±% |
|---|---|---|
| 1951 | 5,259 | +17.1% |
| 1961 | 5,591 | +6.3% |
| 1971 | 4,545 | −18.7% |
| 1981 | 3,799 | −16.4% |
| 1991 | 3,279 | −13.7% |
| 2001 | 3,021 | −7.9% |
| 2011 | 2,561 | −15.2% |
| 2021 | 2,177 | −15.0% |

Source: ISTAT

=== Immigration ===
As of 2025, immigrants make up 1.0% of the population. The 5 largest foreign countries of birth are Romania, Ukraine, France, Germany, and Morocco.
