= Bottidda =

Bottidda Bòtidda (Sardinian)
- Comune
- Comune di Bottidda
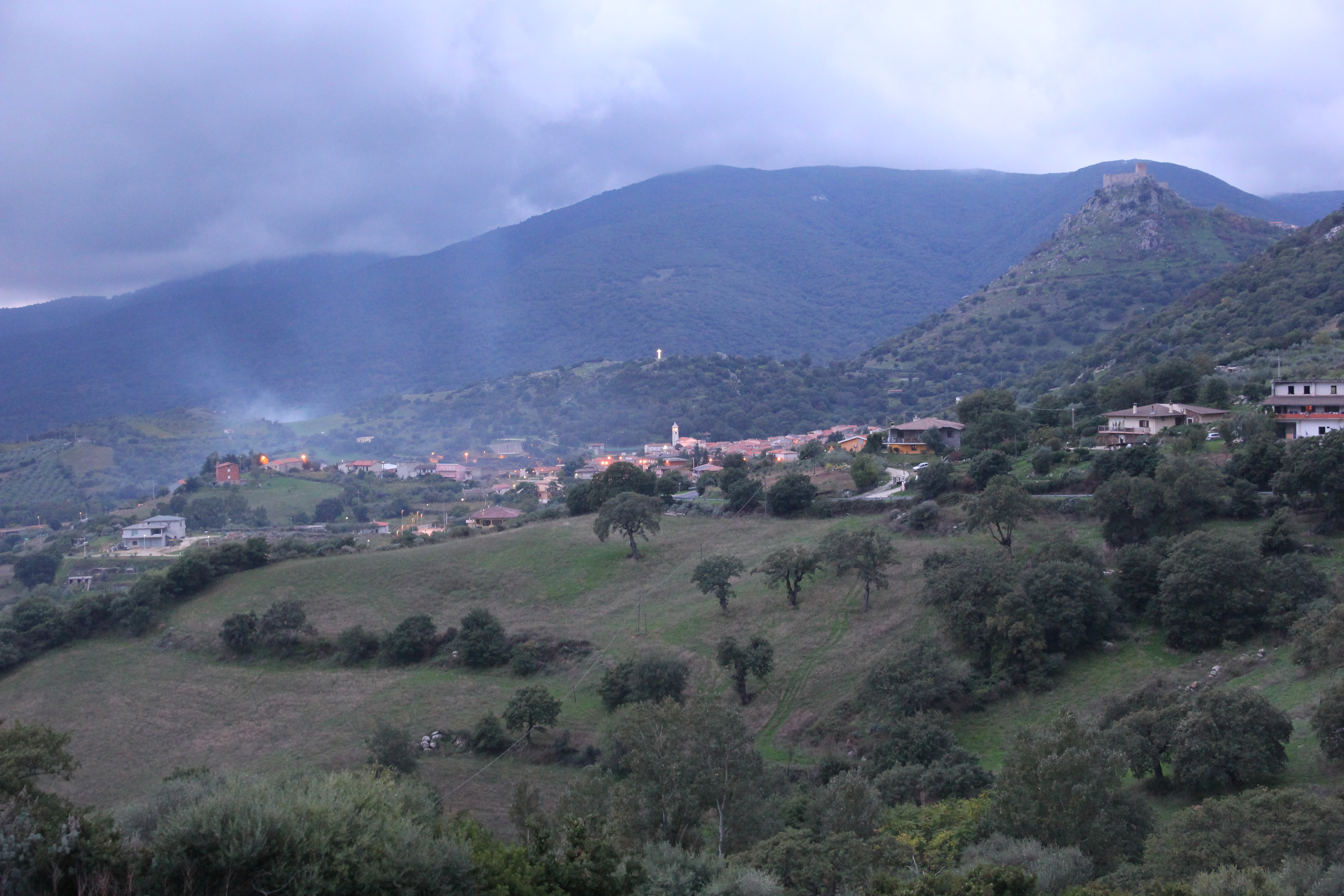
- View of Bottidda

- Location within Sardinia
- Coordinates: 40°23′32″N 9°0′32″E
- Country: Italy
- Region: Sardinia
- Metropolitan city: Sassari (SS)

Government
  - Mayor: Daniele Secondo Cocco

Area
  - Total: 33.71 km^{2} (13.02 sq mi)
- Elevation: 396 m (1,299 ft)

Population (2026)
  - Total: 627
  - Density: 18.6/km^{2} (48.2/sq mi)
- Demonym: Bottiddesi
- Time zone: UTC+1 (CET)
  - Summer (DST): UTC+2 (CEST)
- Postal code: 07010
- Dialing code: 079
- Website: Official website

Bottidda (Sardinian: Bòtidda) is a village and comune (municipality) in the Metropolitan City of Sassari in the autonomous island region of Sardinia in Italy, located about 130 kilometres (81 mi) north of Cagliari and about 50 kilometres (31 mi) southeast of Sassari. It has 627 inhabitants.

Bottidda borders the municipalities of Bono, Bonorva, Burgos, Esporlatu, Illorai, and Orotelli.

== Demographics ==
As of 2026, the population is 627, of which 49.6% are male, and 50.4% are female. Minors make up 13.1% of the population, and seniors make up 31.9%.

Historical population

Year	Pop.	±%
1861	740	—
1871	804	+8.6%
1881	843	+4.9%
1901	1,048	+24.3%
1911	1,125	+7.3%
1921	1,048	−6.8%
1931	1,149	+9.6%
1936	1,158	+0.8%

Year	Pop.	±%
1951	1,197	+3.4%
1961	1,161	−3.0%
1971	1,011	−12.9%
1981	835	−17.4%
1991	825	−1.2%
2001	804	−2.5%
2011	736	−8.5%
2021	651	−11.5%

Source: ISTAT

=== Immigration ===
As of 2025, immigrants make up 4.1% of the population. The 5 largest foreign countries of birth are Romania, Germany, Morocco, Belgium, and France.
