= Nule =

- Comune
- Comune di Nule
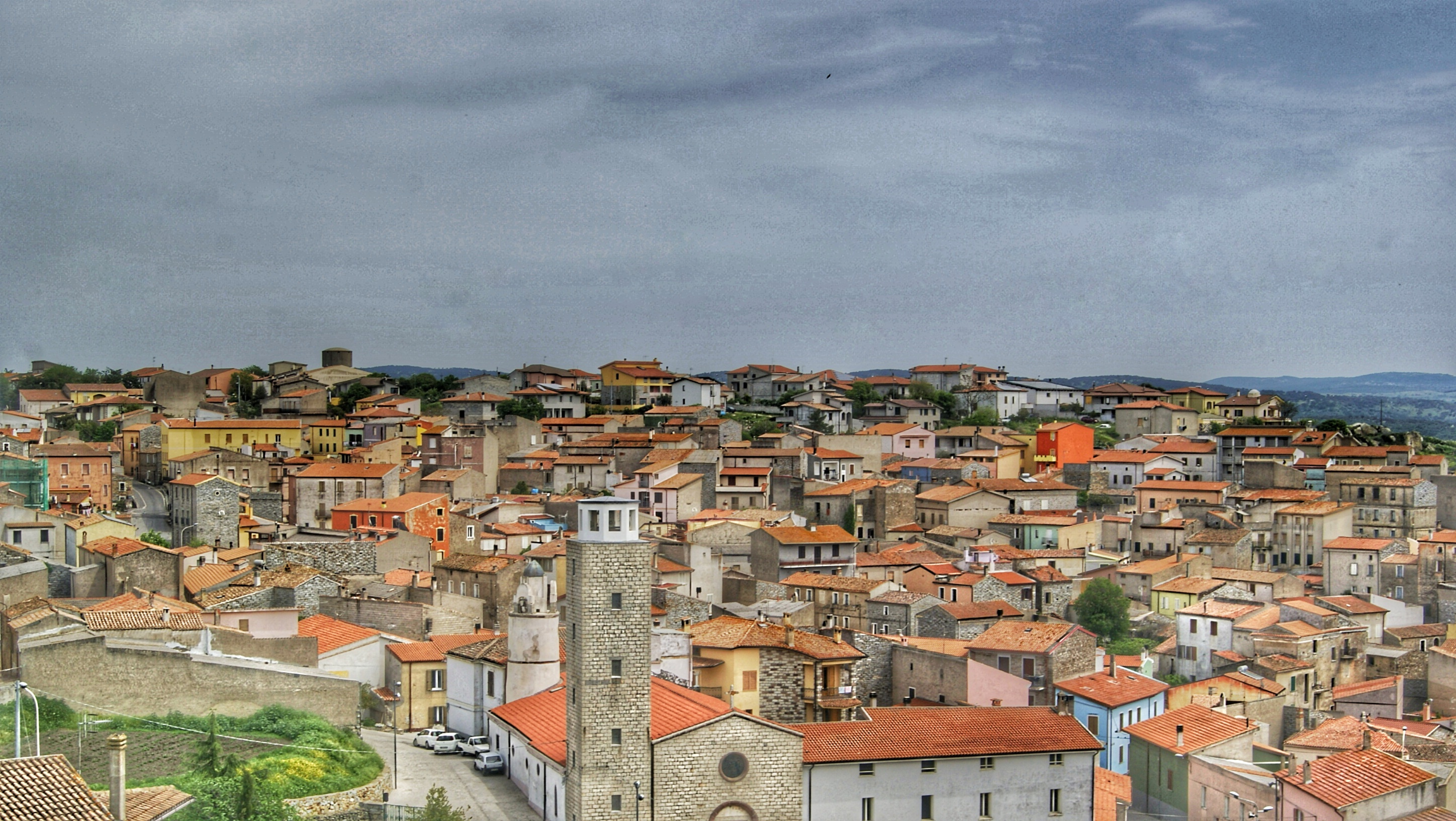
- View of Nule

- Location within Sardinia
- Coordinates: 40°28′N 9°11′E
- Country: Italy
- Region: Sardinia
- Metropolitan city: Sassari (SS)

Government
  - Mayor: Antonio Giuseppe Mellino

Area
  - Total: 51.95 km^{2} (20.06 sq mi)

Population (2026)
  - Total: 1,259
  - Density: 24.23/km^{2} (62.77/sq mi)
- Demonym: Nulese
- Time zone: UTC+1 (CET)
  - Summer (DST): UTC+2 (CEST)
- Postal code: 07010
- Dialing code: 079
- Patron saint: Most Holy Child Mary
- Saint day: September 8
- Website: Official website

Nule is a town and comune (municipality) in the Metropolitan City of Sassari in the autonomous island region of Sardinia in Italy, located about 140 kilometres (87 mi) north of Cagliari and about 60 kilometres (37 mi) southeast of Sassari. It has 1,259 inhabitants.

Nule borders the municipalities of Benetutti, Bitti, Orune, Osidda, and Pattada.

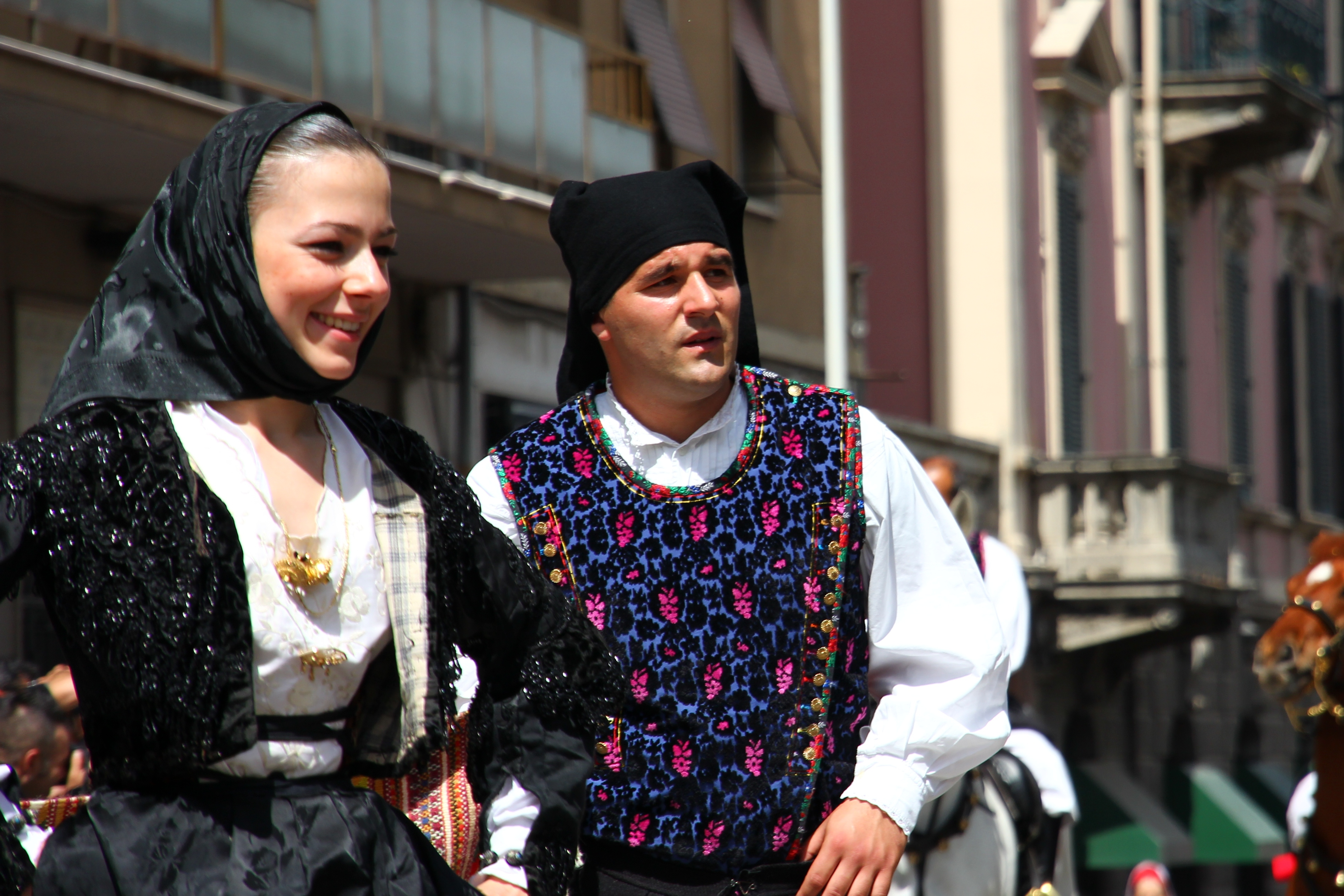
Folk costumes from Nule

== Demographics ==
As of 2026, the population is 1,259, of which 51.2% are males, and 48.8% are females. Minors make up 12.5% of the population, and seniors make up 31.0%.

Historical population

Year	Pop.	±%
1861	1,227	—
1871	1,382	+12.6%
1881	1,474	+6.7%
1901	1,683	+14.2%
1911	1,833	+8.9%
1921	1,821	−0.7%
1931	1,986	+9.1%
1936	1,960	−1.3%

Year	Pop.	±%
1951	1,987	+1.4%
1961	2,109	+6.1%
1971	1,907	−9.6%
1981	1,785	−6.4%
1991	1,719	−3.7%
2001	1,573	−8.5%
2011	1,427	−9.3%
2021	1,293	−9.4%

Source: ISTAT

=== Immigration ===
As of 2025, immigrants make up 2.0% of the population. The 5 largest foreign countries of birth are Australia, Switzerland, Romania, Brazil, and Argentina.
