= Esporlatu =

Esporlatu Isporlatu (Sardinian)
- Comune
- Comune di Esporlatu
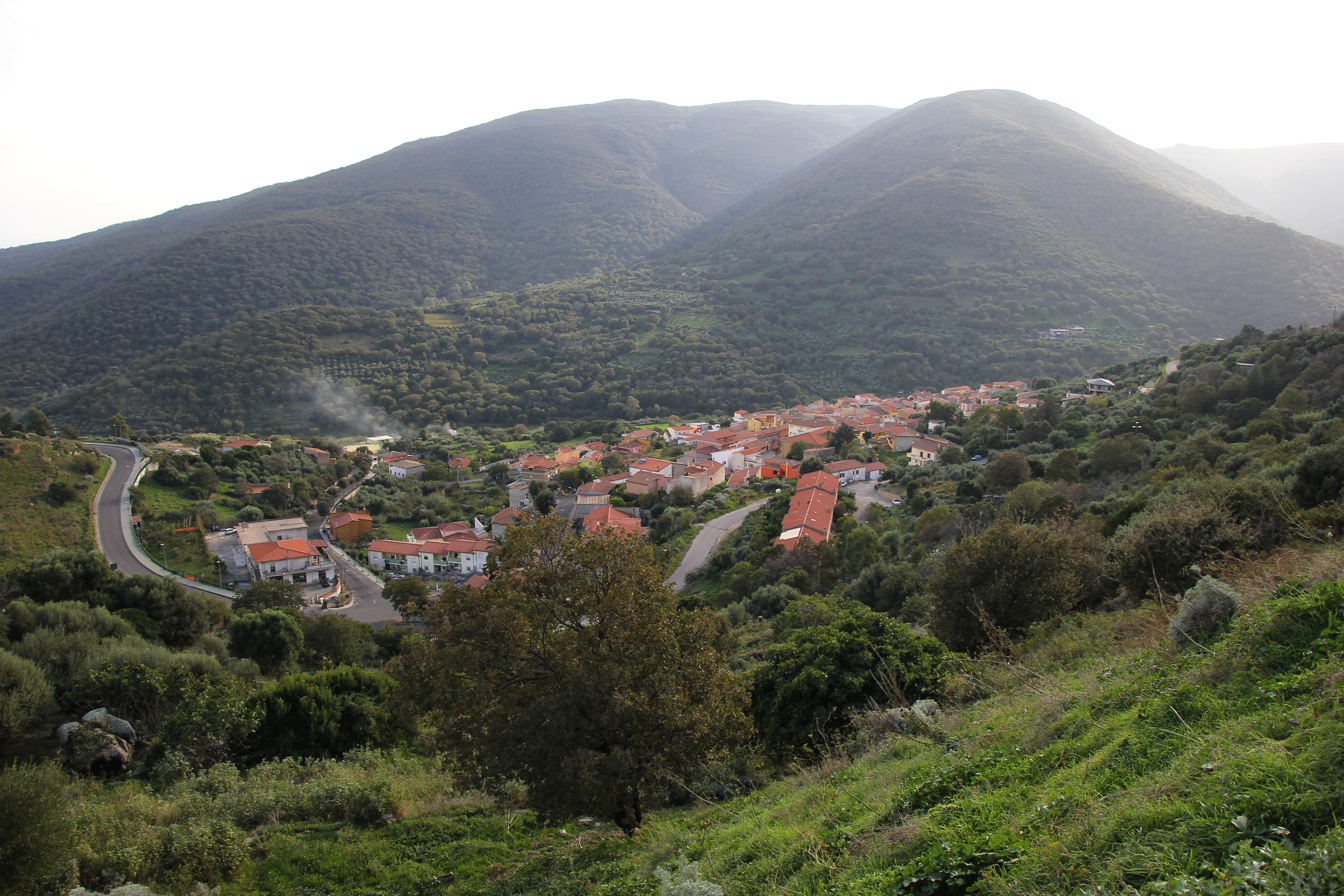
- View of Esporlatu

- Coat of arms

- Location within Sardinia
- Coordinates: 40°23′8″N 8°59′24″E
- Country: Italy
- Region: Sardinia
- Metropolitan city: Sassari (SS)

Government
  - Mayor: Francesco Giuseppe Furriolu

Area
  - Total: 18.40 km^{2} (7.10 sq mi)
- Elevation: 474 m (1,555 ft)

Population (2026)
  - Total: 360
  - Density: 20/km^{2} (51/sq mi)
- Demonym: Esporlatesi
- Time zone: UTC+1 (CET)
  - Summer (DST): UTC+2 (CEST)
- Postal code: 07010
- Dialing code: 079
- Website: Official website

Esporlatu (Sardinian: Isporlatu) is a village and comune (municipality) in the Metropolitan City of Sassari in the autonomous island region of Sardinia in Italy, located about 130 kilometres (81 mi) north of Cagliari and about 50 kilometres (31 mi) southeast of Sassari. It has 360 inhabitants.

Esporlatu borders the municipalities of Bottidda, Burgos, and Illorai.

== Demographics ==
As of 2026, the population is 360, of which 47.8% are male, and 52.2% are female. Minors make up 13.3% of the population, and seniors make up 28.6%.

Historical population

| Year | Pop. | ±% |
|---|---|---|
| 1861 | 334 | — |
| 1871 | 343 | +2.7% |
| 1881 | 379 | +10.5% |
| 1901 | 471 | +24.3% |
| 1911 | 502 | +6.6% |
| 1921 | 576 | +14.7% |
| 1931 | 626 | +8.7% |
| 1936 | 672 | +7.3% |

| Year | Pop. | ±% |
|---|---|---|
| 1951 | 755 | +12.4% |
| 1961 | 689 | −8.7% |
| 1971 | 536 | −22.2% |
| 1981 | 561 | +4.7% |
| 1991 | 485 | −13.5% |
| 2001 | 475 | −2.1% |
| 2011 | 412 | −13.3% |
| 2021 | 382 | −7.3% |

Source: ISTAT

=== Immigration ===
As of 2025, immigrants make up 5.3% of the population. The 5 largest foreign countries of birth are France, Germany, Morocco, Romania, and Switzerland.
