= Illorai =

- Comune
- Comune di Illorai
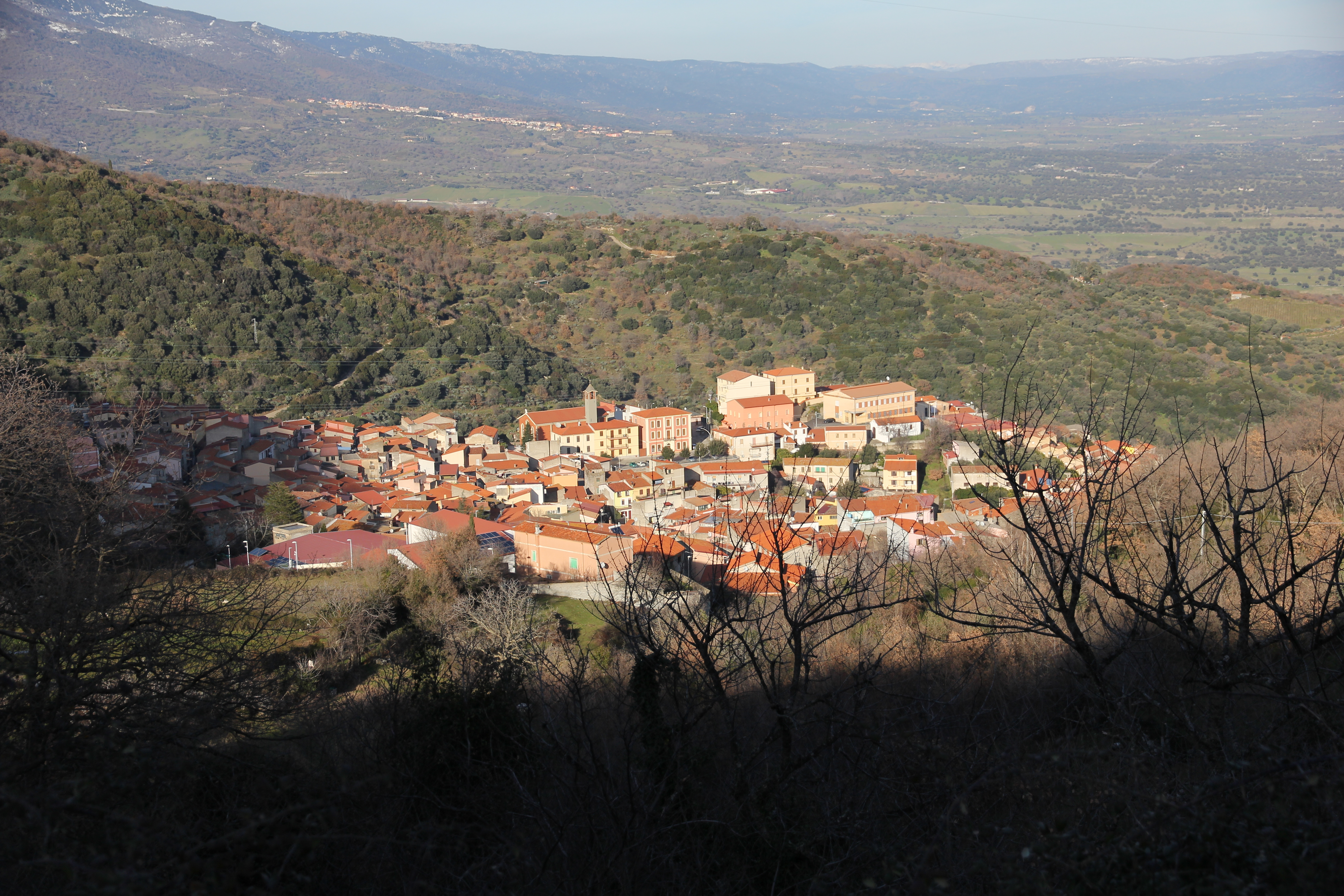
- View of Illorai

- Location within Sardinia
- Coordinates: 40°21′N 9°0′E
- Country: Italy
- Region: Sardinia
- Metropolitan city: Sassari (SS)

Government
  - Mayor: Maria Giovanna Pittalis

Area
  - Total: 57.19 km^{2} (22.08 sq mi)
- Elevation: 503 m (1,650 ft)

Population (2026)
  - Total: 698
  - Density: 12.2/km^{2} (31.6/sq mi)
- Demonym: Illoraesi
- Time zone: UTC+1 (CET)
  - Summer (DST): UTC+2 (CEST)
- Postal code: 07010
- Dialing code: 079
- Website: Official website

Illorai (alternatively also Illurai in Sardinian) is a village and comune (municipality) in the Metropolitan City of Sassari in the autonomous island region of Sardinia in Italy, located about 130 kilometres (81 mi) north of Cagliari and about 60 kilometres (37 mi) southeast of Sassari. It has 698 inhabitants.

Illorai borders the municipalities of Bolotana, Bonorva, Bottidda, Burgos, Esporlatu, Orani, and Orotelli.

== Demographics ==
As of 2026, the population is 698, of which 46.4% are male, and 53.6% are female. Minors make up 10.3% of the population, and seniors make up 34.2%.

Historical population

Year	Pop.	±%
1861	1,066	—
1871	1,197	+12.3%
1881	1,185	−1.0%
1901	1,383	+16.7%
1911	1,491	+7.8%
1921	1,455	−2.4%
1931	1,669	+14.7%
1936	1,817	+8.9%

Year	Pop.	±%
1951	2,002	+10.2%
1961	1,972	−1.5%
1971	1,452	−26.4%
1981	1,359	−6.4%
1991	1,231	−9.4%
2001	1,121	−8.9%
2011	953	−15.0%
2021	763	−19.9%

Source: ISTAT

=== Immigration ===
As of 2025, immigrants make up 3.9% of the population. The 5 largest foreign countries of birth are Germany, Switzerland, Canada, France, and Belgium.
