= Burgos, Sardinia =

Burgos Su Burgu (Sardinian)
- Comune
- Comune di Burgos
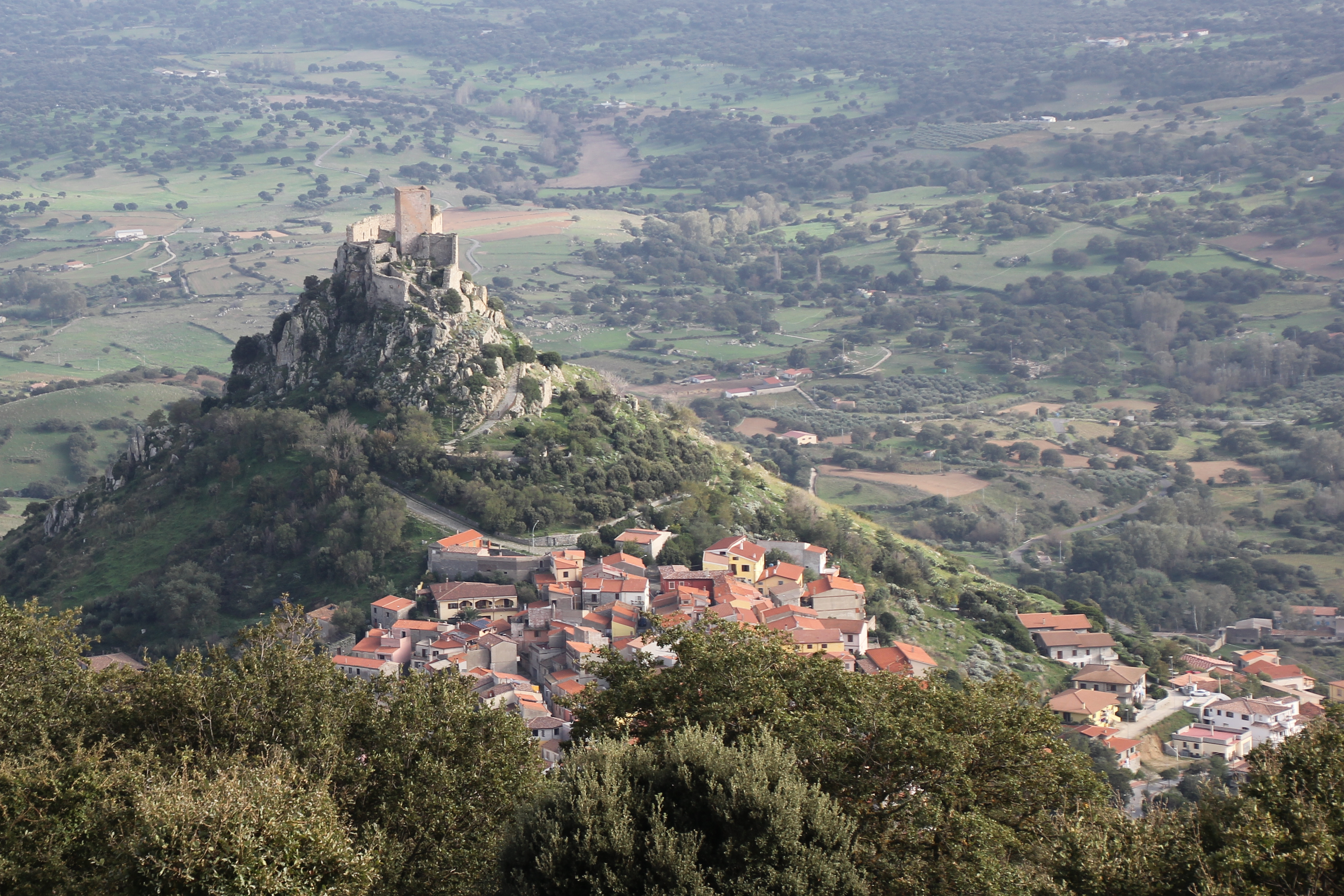
- View of Burgos

- Coat of arms

- Location within Sardinia
- Coordinates: 40°23′30″N 8°59′40″E
- Country: Italy
- Region: Sardinia
- Metropolitan city: Sassari (SS)

Area
  - Total: 18.08 km^{2} (6.98 sq mi)

Population (2026)
  - Total: 817
  - Density: 45.2/km^{2} (117/sq mi)
- Time zone: UTC+1 (CET)
  - Summer (DST): UTC+2 (CEST)
- Postal code: 07010
- Dialing code: 079

Burgos (Sardinian: Su Burgu) is a town and comune (municipality) in the Metropolitan City of Sassari in the autonomous island region of Sardinia in Italy, located about 130 kilometres (81 mi) north of Cagliari and about 50 kilometres (31 mi) southeast of Sassari. It has 817 inhabitants.

Burgos borders the municipalities of Bottidda, Esporlatu, and Illorai.

== Demographics ==
As of 2026, the population is 817, of which 49.1% are male, and 50.9% are female. Minors make up 13.7% of the population, and seniors make up 30.8%.

Historical population

Year	Pop.	±%
1861	682	—
1871	717	+5.1%
1881	818	+14.1%
1901	1,347	+64.7%
1911	1,476	+9.6%
1921	1,646	+11.5%
1931	1,850	+12.4%
1936	1,880	+1.6%

Year	Pop.	±%
1951	2,033	+8.1%
1961	1,724	−15.2%
1971	1,360	−21.1%
1981	1,218	−10.4%
1991	1,107	−9.1%
2001	1,068	−3.5%
2011	944	−11.6%
2021	856	−9.3%

Source: ISTAT

=== Immigration ===
As of 2025, immigrants make up 1.5% of the population. The 5 largest foreign countries of birth are Switzerland, Germany, Australia, Belgium, and Costa Rica.
