= Bono, Sardinia =

Bono
- Comune
- Comune di Bono
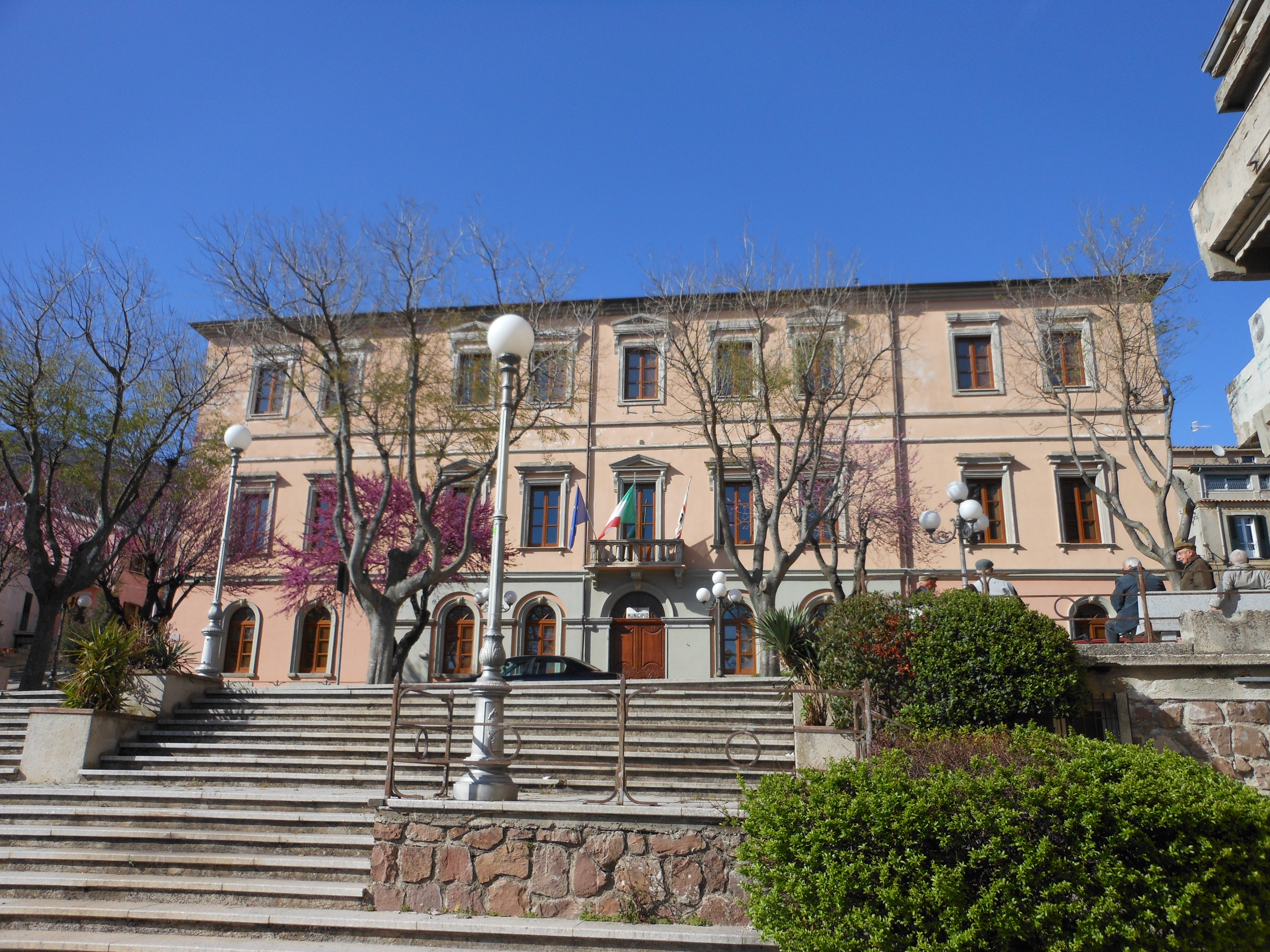
- Town hall

- Coat of arms

- Location within Sardinia
- Coordinates: 40°25′00″N 9°01′50″E
- Country: Italy
- Region: Sardinia
- Metropolitan city: Sassari (SS)

Government
  - Mayor: Michele Solinas

Area
  - Total: 74.54 km^{2} (28.78 sq mi)
- Elevation: 540 m (1,770 ft)

Population (2026)
  - Total: 3,232
  - Density: 43.36/km^{2} (112.3/sq mi)
- Time zone: UTC+1 (CET)
  - Summer (DST): UTC+2 (CEST)
- Postal code: 07011
- Dialing code: 079
- Website: Official website

Bono is a town and comune (municipality) in the Metropolitan City of Sassari in the autonomous island region of Sardinia in Italy, located about 130 kilometres (81 mi) north of Cagliari and about 50 kilometres (31 mi) southeast of Sassari. It has 3,232 inhabitants.

== History ==
The territory of Bono has been inhabited by man since the Nuraghic age as evidenced by the numerous nuraghi scattered throughout the territory.

== Demographics ==
As of 2026, the population is 3,232, of which 49.6% are male, and 50.4% are female. Minors make up 14.7% of the population, and seniors make up 26.2%.

Historical population

Year	Pop.	±%
1861	2,816	—
1871	3,208	+13.9%
1881	3,189	−0.6%
1901	3,752	+17.7%
1911	3,825	+1.9%
1921	4,013	+4.9%
1931	4,265	+6.3%
1936	4,518	+5.9%

Year	Pop.	±%
1951	4,815	+6.6%
1961	4,906	+1.9%
1971	4,111	−16.2%
1981	4,043	−1.7%
1991	4,061	+0.4%
2001	3,800	−6.4%
2011	3,636	−4.3%
2021	3,356	−7.7%

Source: ISTAT

=== Immigration ===
As of 2025, immigrants make up 3.6% of the population. The 5 largest foreign countries of birth are Germany, Morocco, France, Romania, and Argentina.
