= Gallura =

Region in North-Eastern Sardinia, Italy

Coordinates: 41.0000°N 9.3000°E

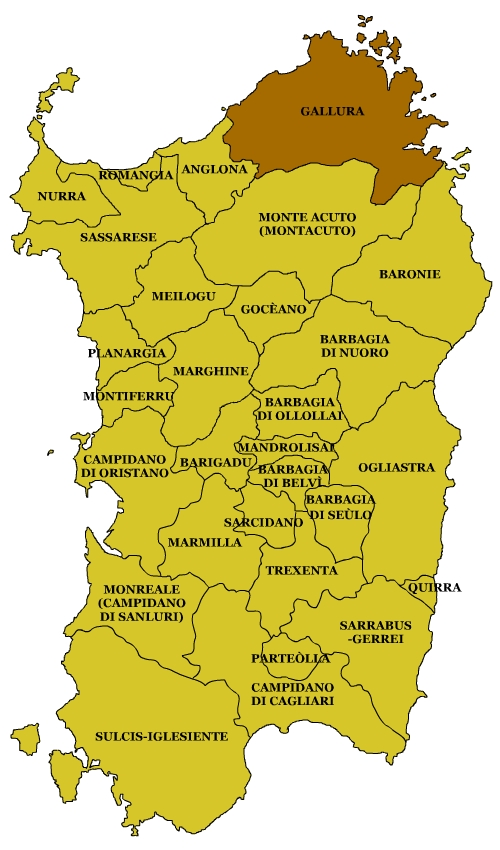
Map of Gallura

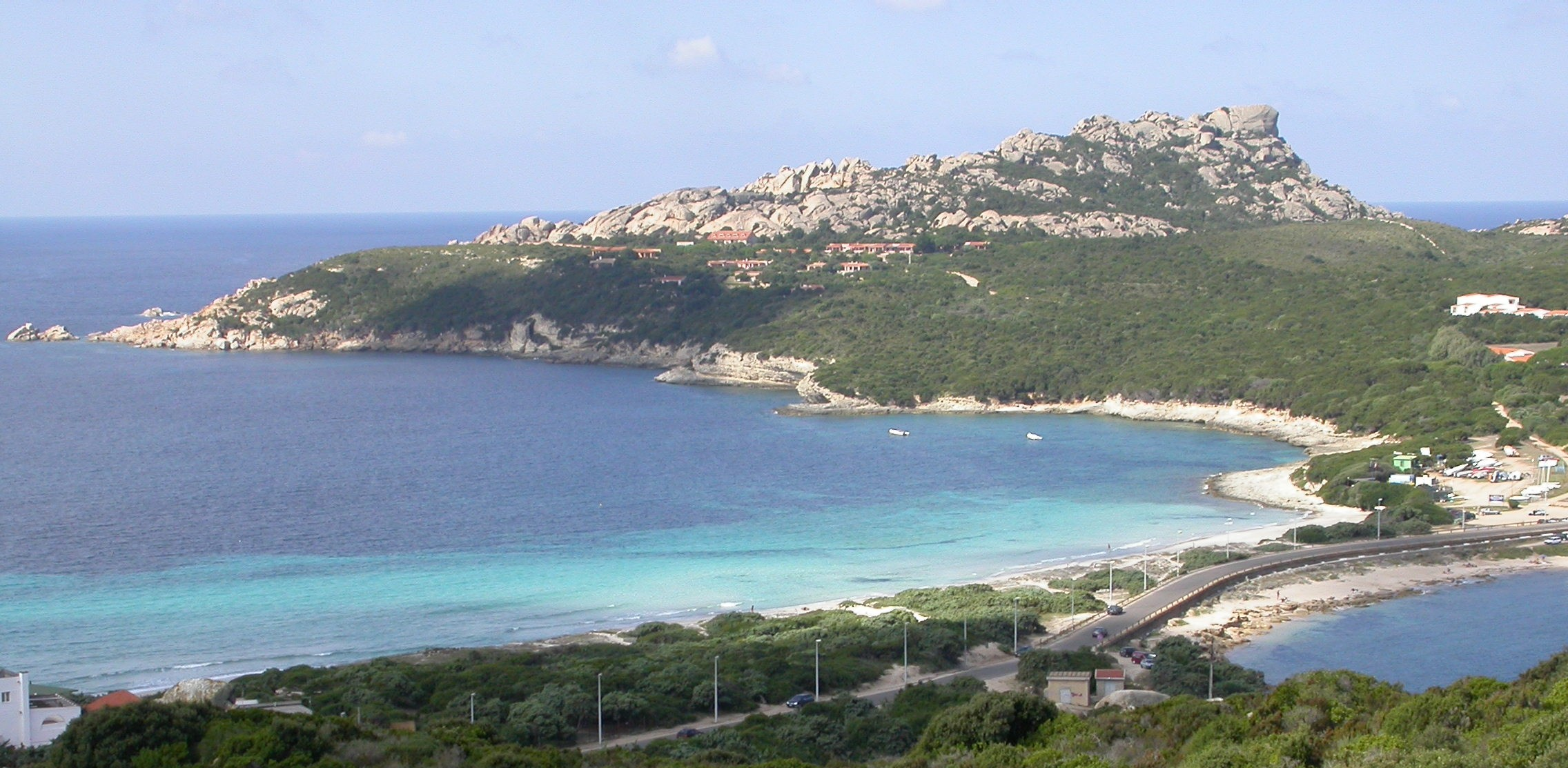
Capo Testa (Capu Testa in Gallurese and Corsican)

Gallura (Gallurese: Gaddura or Gaddhura [ɡaˈɖːura]; Sardinian: Caddura [kaˈɖːuɾa]) is a region in North-Eastern Sardinia, Italy.

The name Gallùra is allegedly supposed to mean "stony area".

== Geography ==
Gallùra has an area of 3,550 square kilometres (1,370 sq mi). It is 187 kilometres (101 nautical miles) from the Italian peninsula and 11 km (6 nmi) from the French island of Corsica. The coast of Gallura is very jagged and continues along in a continuous series of small fiords, rock-cliffs and little islands that form the archipelago of La Maddalena, a natural bridge towards nearby Corsica. The landscape is characterised by granite rocks and harsh mountains that, even if not particularly high, have constituted for millennia a barrier between this region and the nearby territories of Baronie and Montalbo. Monte Limbara is the highest mountain (1,362 m/4,469 ft). It represents the boundary between Gallura and the nearby region called Logudoro. Its highest peak is Punta Balestrieri (1362 m above the sea level). In the past, Monte Limbara used to be the location of an important NATO long range radar base and a Carabinieri’s barrack. Today it is used as a telecommunications center for the Italian Air Force and a heliport for the Servizio Antincendi. It is also the location of all the major TV relay stations of West Sardinia. Another small mountain is Monte Cruzitta (666 m). Even if it is not very high, it offers a very characteristic landscape. The climate is typical of the Mediterranean. The weather is clear. During the year approximately 300 days are sunny and the few others are rainy, with a major concentration of rainfall in the winter and autumn, some heavy showers in the spring, and snowfalls on the highest massifs and highlands. The mistral is the dominant wind, fresh, strong, and usually dry and cold, blowing from the northwest throughout the year, but most frequently in winter and spring.

== History ==
=== Prehistory ===
The first human settlements in Gallura date back to approximately 30.000 years ago, when the first populations crossed the strait between Tuscany and Sardinia. This historic period is known as the Stone Age. Foreign populations colonize Gallura due to its numerous natural resources. Many people from the nearby island of Corsica came as well to Gallura during this historic period. The mid-late neolithic Arzachena culture subsisted almost exclusively in this area, and here is found the remains of perhaps the oldest megalith on Sardinia, at Li Muri.

=== From Nuragic Prehistory to Antiquity ===
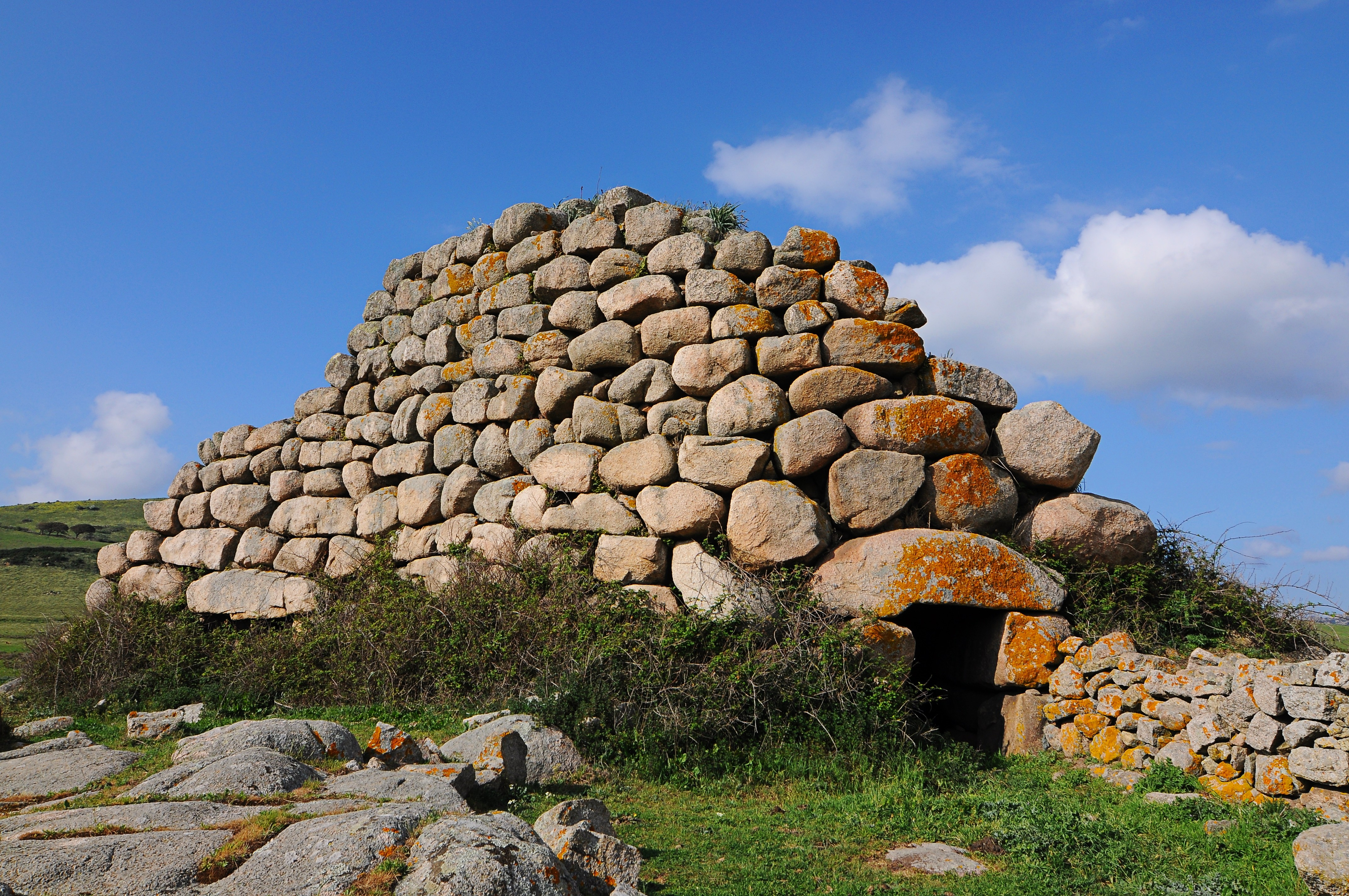
Nuraghe Izzana

The historic period that goes from 1700 BC to the Roman Age is also known in Sardinia as the Nuragic Age. The particular name of this historic period takes after the Nuraghes, the biggest megalithic edifices ever found in Europe, which still today represent a symbol for Sardinia.

The Phoenicians founded the (hence Punic) city of Olbia (renamed in Greek, though), which was conquered by the Romans with all of Gallura in 238 BC.

=== The Judicate of Gallura ===
During the Middle Ages, Gallura was one of the four Judicates, the four autonomous states into which Sardinia was divided under pope Alexander's assent. Civita (which today is known as Olbia) was the capital of the Giudicato of Gallura and the (first) bishop's see. The Judicate of Gallura included today's area of Gallura, the area surrounding the city of Nuoro, and the area called Baronias (Italian: Baronie). It was occupied by the republic of Pisa in 1288 after the fall of the last ruling judge Nino Visconti.

=== Late Middle Ages till the eighteenth century ===
At the end of the 13th century, the city of Civita (today's Olbia) takes the name of Terranova, a new settlement founded by the pisans near the site of the ancient Roman port of Olbia. Pirates – primarily from North Africa – raided the coasts of Gallura and people moved consequently from there to the hinterland. The city of Tempio became especially populated. Between 1300 and 1800 there was a big emigration of people from the nearby island of Corsica to Gallura. Corsicans deeply influenced the language and the culture of Gallura, which still today is considered quite different from the culture and the dialects of the rest of Sardinia.

By the end of the 1700s people started to move from the hinterland to the coasts.

=== Nineteenth century, Twentieth century and today ===
During the nineteenth century the bishop's see was transferred from the city of Olbia to the city of Tempio, which also became a district's capital.

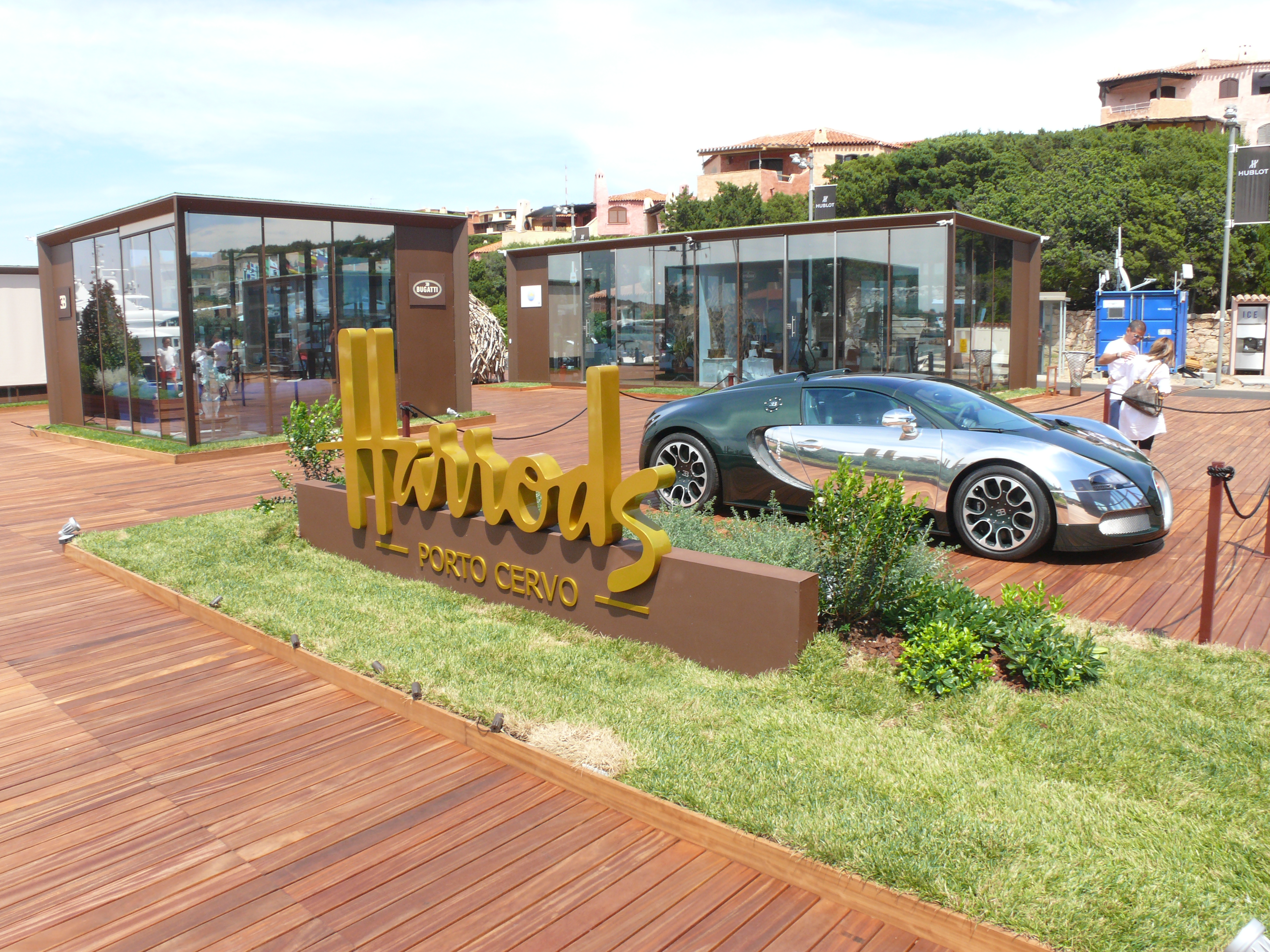
The Bugatti stand at Harrods in Porto Cervo

In the second half of the 20th century, tourism increased greatly, especially in the areas of Costa Smeralda, Santa Teresa di Gallura and San Teodoro. Today, Gallura has the highest capital income in all of Sardinia.

=== Ecclesiastical history ===
The region's original Roman bishopric, the Diocese of Fausania (P(h)ausania), founded no later than the 5th century (tradition says by the 3rd century saint Simplicius), of disputed location (Olbia, Tempio Pausania or Posano) perished under Byzantine rule, probably in the 8th century.

It was restored under the name of Gallura in 1070, renamed Civita after its see (the medieval name of Olbia) and from 1506 held in personal union with the Diocese of Ampurias, but no later than the 12th century a second bishopric was established, the Diocese of Galtelli.

== Demographics ==
Gallura has a population of 143,921 people; the Sardinians from this area are called Galluresi (Gallurese: Gadduresi). The population density has remarkably increased in small centers along the eastern coast and in the cities of Arzachena and Olbia. The population density of 12 municipalities out of 26 has however decreased (-4%) in centers located in the country -side and on the mountains. This tendency depends on the increase of the seaside tourism.

In general, Sardinia represents the Italian region with the lowest fertility rate (1.087 births per woman), and the region with the second lowest birth rate.

=== Main towns ===
Olbia

Olbia (medieval Civita) is a town of approximately 55,000 inhabitants. It represents the city with the highest population density of the entire Gallura. In 2005 it became an administrative capital together with Tempio-Pausania. They form the province called Olbia-Tempio. Founded in 350 BC, it used to be one of the most important trade areas of the Mediterranean Sea. Today, it represents the economic center of Sardinia due to its airport, its seaport and also to its closeness to the famous Costa Smeralda tourist area.

Tempio Pausania

Tempio Pausania is a town of 13,800 inhabitants. Together with Olbia, it is the administrative capital of the province Olbia-Tempio. Founded around 250 BC, Tempio Pausania is located 560m above the sea level. It represents both the geographical and the cultural capital of Gallura. Every year, thousands of tourists come to visit Tempio Pausania to assist to the characteristic carnevale (carnival), which takes place at the end of February.

Arzachena

Arzachena is a town of 12,080 inhabitants. It represents the administrative capital of the Costa Smeralda tourist area. Founded in 1961 by the prince Karim Aga Khan, Costa Smeralda represents the most exclusive tourist area of Gallura. Arzachena is also famous for its archeology. Its archeological sites include the LiMuri Tomba dei Giganti (Giants’ Grave).

La Maddalena

La Maddalena is part of an archipelago called Arcipelago della Maddalena. It is situated in the Straits of Bonifacio, which divide Sardinia from Corsica. La Maddalena represents the largest town of this archipelago, which includes the islands of Caprera, S. Stefano, Spargi, Budelli, S. Maria and Razzoli. La Maddalena represents an important tourist site in Gallura and the island of Caprera is famous for being the residence of the Italian revolutionary Giuseppe Garibaldi.

== Economy ==
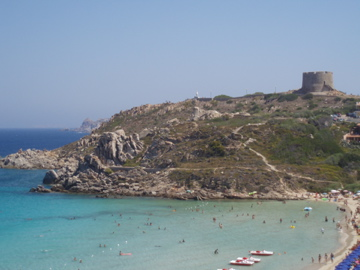
Santa Teresa di Gallura

The economy of Gallura is based mostly on tourism and hospitality due to the presence of Costa Smeralda and other world-famous sea sites. The primary sector is not as important as in the rest of Sardinia. It is based mostly on wine production. Also sheep breeding, dairy production, and poultry farm are relevant. The secondary sector is quite important. It is mostly based on cork work and mineral processing of granite. In fact, it is easy to find cork oaks in many parts of the region and the whole area is rich in granite, especially in vicinity of Monte Limbara. Cork production is one of the main economic activity in the interior, while on the coasts are developed fish factories and shipyards.

=== Transportation ===
Gallura has one international airport (Olbia-Costa Smeralda Airport), which is situated in the city of Olbia. It represents one of the three international airports of Sardinia and the base of the Sardinian airline Meridiana, Italy's third-largest airline.

Another way to reach the region of Gallura is by ferry. The ferry companies operating on the Island are Tirrenia di Navigazione, Moby Lines, Corsica Ferry, Grandi Navi Veloci, Snav, SNCM and CMN. They link the harbors of Olbia, Golfo Aranci, Santa Teresa di Gallura and Palau to the harbors of the Italian peninsula, France, Corsica and Spain.

== Culture ==
=== Language ===
The native language of the area is Gallurese, which is also recognized by the Regional Government of Sardinia. Gallurese is usually not considered a dialect of Sardinian, since it is quite different from most of the other Sardinian dialects, but rather as a direct offshoot from Corsican. Luras and Padru, two small towns in the province of Olbia-Tempio, are the only areas in Gallura in which Gallurese is not traditionally spoken. Sardinian is also spoken in its Logudorese variety.

== Environment ==
With 1,213,250 hectares of woods, Sardinia represents the Italian region with the largest forest extension. Regional landscape plans regulate building activities along the coasts, the forests, and other natural sites.

National Parks

La Maddalena's national park

Sardinia has ten regional parks and three national parks. One of these three national parks is located in Gallura, i.e., the Archipelago of La Maddalena's National Park. This park is a world-famous tourist area due to the beauty of its beaches and to the one of its landscape, where granite rocks alternate with green areas.

=== Renewable energies ===
Renewable energies have increased impressively during the recent years in Sardinia. Due to the windy climate, the most important renewable energy in Gallura is the wind power. During the past years however, the installation of wind power systems has been the subject of controversial debates due to its landscape impact.

== Sources and external links ==
- Martina Di Marco Blog
- La Mia Sardegna
- Sardinia on Wikipedia
- Sardegna Turismo-Tourism in Sardinia
- Analysis of Sardinia's Demographics
- Gallura in Tasca
- Gallura Sviluppo-Economics
- Itinerari-Tourism
- Info Sardinia
- Sardegna Ambiente-Environment
- Caica Sardegna-Environment
