= Roman Catholic Diocese of Civita =

Civita diocese in Sardinia

Map of province of Olbia-Tempio

The Roman Catholic Diocese of Civita was a Latin Catholic bishopric in the Gallura region of northeastern Sardinia, facing the Tyrrhenian Sea.

It was the successor to the ancient diocese of Pausania or Phausania (Italian: Fausania) (6th to 8th? century), restored in 1070 as the Diocese of Gallura, and then in 1113 renamed the Diocese of Civita, after its episcopal seat. In 1506, the diocese of Civita was united to its neighbor, the diocese of Ampurias, with one and the same bishop presiding over two distinct dioceses. In 1839 it was renamed the Dioceses of Civita e Tempio. In 1986, the diocese of Civita was suppressed and its territory was merged into the Diocese of Tempio-Ampurias.

== Ancient diocese of Fausania ==
No later than the sixth century, a Roman bishopric was established at a place called Pausania or Phausania, which may be Olbia, Tempio Pausania or even Posada (50 km south of Olbia).

While the local Saint Simplicius is traditionally called its first bishop (4th century ?), a historical thesis holds it may have been (re?)founded by Catholic bishop(s) exiled by king Huneric of the Vandal Kingdom after his council of Carthage replaced them with Donatist heretic counterparts; it is suggested that the diocese of Fausania was abandoned again due to the invasion of the Ostrogoths under king Totila in 552.

In 594, Pope Gregory the Great wrote to the Metropolitan archbishop of the Cagliari, the only metropolitan on the island, exhorting him to consecrate a candidate for the diocese of Fausania, which had not had a bishop for a long time. Its first documented incumbent, Bishop Victor, and the other bishops of Sardinia were advised in a papal letter in July 599 to pay due attention to their metropolitan; the pope also wrote to Spesindeus, the Praeses Sardiniae, in October 600, recalling Victor's work to evangelize the pagan locals, and ordering him to assist the bishop. and attended a synod in Rome in 600.

The see of Fausania (Φαυσιάνη) is still listed in the Byzantine Notitia Episcopatuum as a suffragan of Cagliari circa 1000.

== Diocese of Civita ==
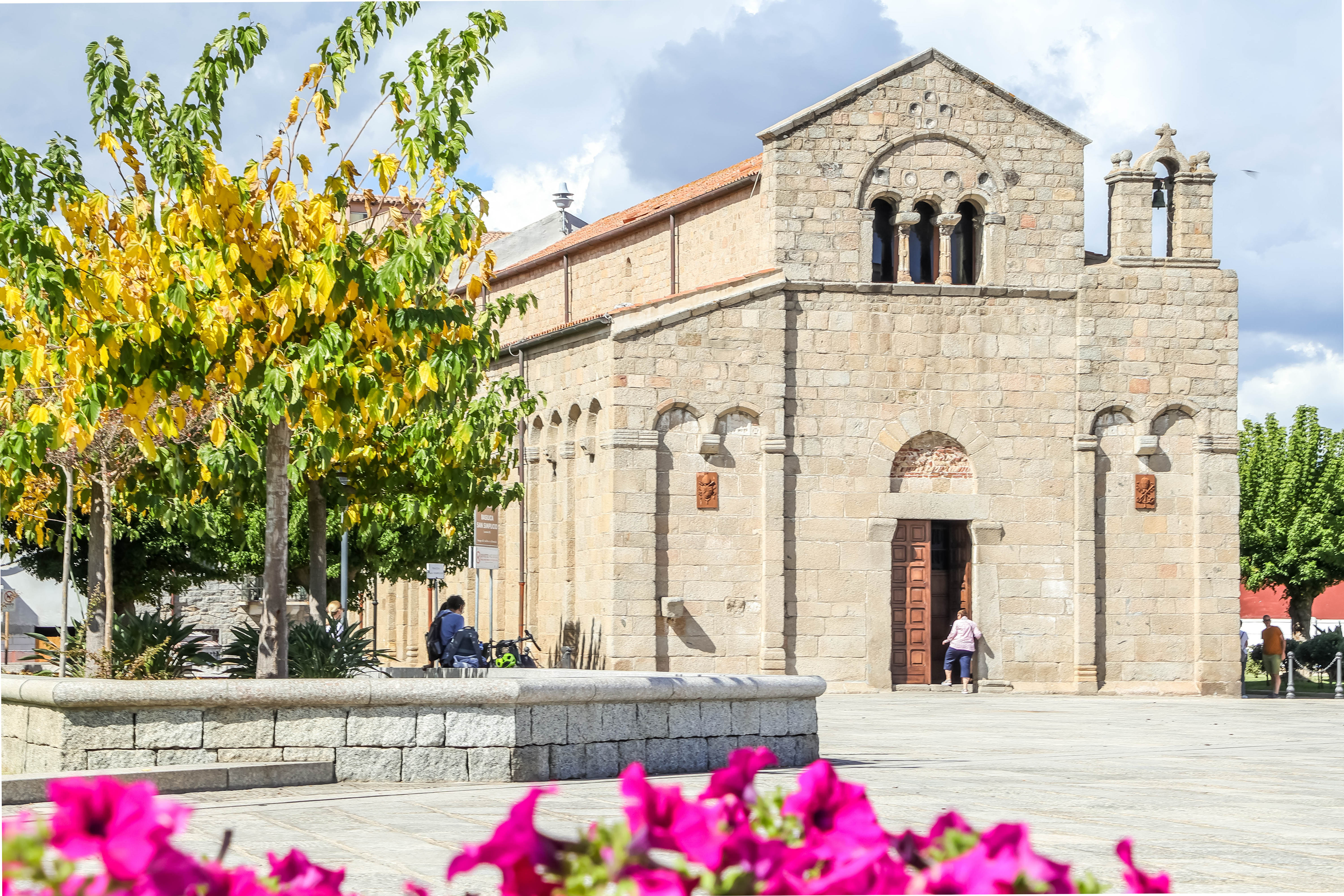
The Basilica of San Simplicio in Olbia (former cathedral of Civita)

The diocese of Cività, now part of the diocese of Tempio-Ampurias, was allegedly founded in 304 by St. Simplicius. Simplicius is referred to as a priest in the sources, however, not a bishop. The diocese was actually founded in the 12th century. In the late 11th century, the church of San Simplicio was begun (in Olbia, then called Civita); its upper walls and barrel vaults are of the early 12th century, and the façade of the mid-12th century.

On 25 May 1133, Pope Innocent II placed the dioceses of Galtelli(na), Civitas, and Populonia under the metropolitan jurisdiction of Archbishop Hubertus of Pisa. The same grant was made to his successor, Archbishop Balduin on 22 April 1138, with the bull "Tunc Apostolicae Sedis." By the middle of the 13th century, however, the diocese was directly dependent upon the Papacy (i.e. not a member of any ecclesiastical province).

During the Western Schism, several bishops of Ampurias e Tempio followed the Avignon Obedience, rather than the Roman Obedience.

From 6 May 1506, the see was held in personal union ('United aeque principaliter ') with the neighboring Diocese of Ampurias.

Pope Gregory XVI suppressed the cathedral of Cività ed Ampurias in Terranova by the Bull "Quamvis aqua," signed on 26 August 1839, and raised the Collegiate Church of St. Peter, in Tempio, to cathedral status. Tempio and Ampurias were united, so that one bishop should govern both, aeque personaliter. The official title became "the bishop of Ampurias and of Tempio." The name "Civita" ceased to be used, replaced by "Tempio."

They were formally merged on 30 September 1986, and renamed the Diocese of Tempio-Ampurias. After the merger, the former cathedral at Olbia (the former Civita) remained only a minor basilica, while the seat of the bishop is at the Cattedrale di S. Pietro Apostolo, in Tempio-Pausania.

=== Bishops of Civita ===
...

- Bernardo (1173)
- Filippone (1223, 1229)
- Pietro (1245)

...

- Petrus ( ? ―1329)
- Laurentius de Viterbio, O.P. (1329–1343)
- Bernardus Rubei, O.Min. (1344– )
- Tommaso Sferrato, O.Min. (1351 – 1353)
- Gerardo, O.Min. (1353 – 1362)
- Alfonso (1363 – 1383)
- Siffredo di Tommaso, O. Carm. (1383 – 1388) Avignon Obedience
- Francesco de Marginibus (1390 – ?) Avignon Obedience
- Simone (1390 – ?)
- Simone Margens (1401 – 1407)
- Angelo (1409? – ?)
- Sancio (? – 1433.01.14), next Bishop of Minervino (1433.01.14 – 1434)
- Lorenzo Scopulart, O.P. (1439? – ?)
- Agostino di Poggibonsi, O.E.S.A. (1442? – death 1443)
- Antonio de Fontanis, O.F.M. (1443.10.30 – 1460)
- Rodrigo de Sesse, O.F.M. (1460 – death 1490)
- Pedro Stornell, O.P. (1490 – 1510)

=== Bishops of Ampurias and Civita ===
From 1506 all bishops of Civita are simultaneously bishops of Ampurias, aeque principaliter

- Francesco Manno(1506–1511)
- Luis González, O.F.M. (8 June 1513–1538)
- Giorgio Artea (1538–1545)
- Luis de Casas, O.E.S.A. (22 May 1545 – ?)
- Francisco Tomás (23 May 1558 – 1572)
- Pedro Narro, O.S.B. (30 July 1572 – 22 October 1574)
- Gaspare Vincenzo Novella (18 September 1575 – 6 October 1578)
- Miguel Rubio, Cistercian Order (O. Cist.) (26 June 1579 – 1586)
- Giovanni Sanna (1586 – death 1606)
- Diego Passamar (1613 – 13 June 1622)
- Giovanni de la Bronda (1622 – 1633)
- Andrea Manca (1633 – 13 July 1644)
- Gavino Manca Figo (17 October 1644 – 1652)
- Gaspare Litago (29 April 1652 – 26 June 1656)
- Laurentius Sampero (28 August 1656 – 1669)
- Pedro de Alagó y de Cardona (5 August 1669 – 15 January 1672)
- José Sanchis i Ferrandis, O. de M. (22 February 1672 – 1673)
- Juan Bautista Sorribas, O. Carm. (25 September 1673 – 1679)
- Giuseppe Acorrà (25 September 1679 – 30 April 1685)
- Francesco Sampero (1 October 1685 – 1688)
- Michele Villa (19 November 1688 – 1700)
- Diego Serafino Posulo, O.P. (11 December 1702 – 1718)
- Angelo Galcerin, O.F.M. Conv. (17 May 1727 – 1735)
- Giovanni Leonardo Sanna (26 September 1736 – 30 September 1737)
- Vincenzo Giovanni Vico Torrellas (30 September 1737 – 3 July 1741)
- Salvator Angelo Cadello (5 July 1741 – 1764)
- Pietro Paolo Carta (1764 – 1771)
- Francesco Ignazio Guiso (1772 – 1778)
- Giovanni Antonio Arras Minutili (1779 – 1784)
- Michele Pes (14 February 1785 – 1804)
- Giuseppe Stanislao Paradisi (18 September 1807 – 29 March 1819)

=== Bishops of Ampurias e Tempio ===
- Diego Capece (1833–1855)

Sede vacante (1854–1871)

- Filippo Campus (1871–1887)
- Paolo Pinna (1887–1892)
- Antonio Maria Contini (16 January 1893–1907)

Sede vacante (1907–1914)

- Giovanni Maria Sanna, O.F.M. Conv. (14 December 1914–12 May 1922)
- Albino Morera (14 December 1922 – 9 December 1950 Retired)
- Carlo Re, I.M.C. (29 December 1951 – 10 February 1961 Retired)
- Mario Ghiga (10 February 1961 – 31 March 1963)
- Giovanni Melis Fois (25 May 1963 – 7 November 1970)
- Carlo Urru (7 March 1971 – 21 April 1982)
- Pietro Meloni (9 June 1983 – suppression of diocese of Tempio: 30 September 1986)

== See also ==
- Diocese of Tempio-Ampurias
- List of Catholic dioceses in Italy

== Sources and external links ==
=== Lists of bishops ===
- Eubel, Conradus, ed. (1913). Hierarchia catholica (in Latin). Vol. 1 (Tomus 1) (second ed.). Münster: Libreria Regensbergiana. pp. 188–189.. Archived.
- Eubel, Conradus, ed. (1914). Hierarchia catholica (in Latin). Vol. 2 (Tomus 2) (second ed.). Münster: Libreria Regensbergiana. p. 129.. Archived.
- Eubel, Conradus, ed. (1923). Hierarchia catholica (in Latin). Vol. 3 (Tomus 3) (second ed.). Münster: Libreria Regensbergiana. p. 107.. Archived.
- Gams, Pius Bonifatius (1873). Series episcoporum Ecclesiae catholicae: quotquot innotuerunt a beato Petro apostolo. Ratisbon: Typis et Sumptibus Georgii Josephi Manz. pp. 834–835. (Use with caution; obsolete)
- Gauchat, Patritius (Patrice) (1935). Hierarchia catholica (in Latin). Vol. IV (1592-1667). Münster: Libraria Regensbergiana. p. 87.
- Ritzler, Remigius; Sefrin, Pirminus (1952). Hierarchia catholica medii et recentis aevi (in Latin). Vol. V (1667-1730). Patavii: Messagero di S. Antonio.
- Ritzler, Remigius; Sefrin, Pirminus (1958). Hierarchia catholica medii et recentis aevi (in Latin). Vol. 6 (1730-1799). Patavii: Messagero di S. Antonio.
- Ritzler, Remigius; Sefrin, Pirminus (1968). Hierarchia Catholica medii et recentioris aevi (in Latin). Vol. 7 (1800–1846). Monasterii: Libr. Regensburgiana.
- Ritzler, Remigius; Sefrin, Pirminus (1978). Hierarchia catholica Medii et recentioris aevi (in Latin). Vol. 8 (1846–1903). Il Messaggero di S. Antonio.
- Pięta, Zenon (2002). Hierarchia catholica medii et recentioris aevi (in Latin). Vol. 9 (1903–1922). Padua: Messagero di San Antonio. ISBN 978-88-250-1000-8.

=== Studies ===
==== Bibliography - Fausania ====
- Bucolo, Raffaela (2010). "Fausania (Olbia?)," in: Raffaela Bucolo (editor), "Le sedi episcopali della Sardegna paleocristiana. Riflessioni topografiche," Rivista di archeologia cristiana 86 (2010), pp. 378–383.
- Lanzoni, Francesco (1927). Le diocesi d'Italia dalle origini al principio del secolo VII (an. 604), vol. II, Faenza 1927, pp. 677–679
- Spanu, Pier Giorgio Ignazio (1998). La Sardegna bizantina tra 6 e 7 secolo. Oristano 1998. pp. 114–119.

==== Bibliography - Civita ====
- Agus, Luigi (2009). San Simplicio in Olbia e la diocesi di Civita. Studio artistico e socio-religioso dell'edificio medievale. (in Italian). Catanzaro 2009.
- Bima, Palemona Luigi (1845). Serie cronologica degli arcivescovi e vescovi del regno di Sardegna. (in Italian). Asti: Raspi & Riba 1845. (pp. 75-81)
- Cappelletti, Giuseppe (1857). Le chiese d'Italia dalla loro origine sino ai nostri giorni (in Italian). Vol. decimoterzo (13). Venezia: Antonelli. pp. 155–171..
- Castellaccio, Angelo Aldo 2004). "Olbia nel medioevo. Aspetti politico-istituzionali," (in Italian), in: Da Olbìa ad Olbia. 2500 anni di storia di una città mediterranea, Sassari: Edes-Editrice Democratica Sarda, 2004, pp. 33–70.
- Fara, Giovanni Francesco (1835). De chorographia Sardiniae: libri duo de rebus Sardois libri quatuor edente Aloisio Cibrario. (in Latin). Turin: Typographia Regia, 1835.
- Floris, Giacomo (2013). Signoria, incastellamento e riorganizzazione di un territorio nel tardo Medioevo: il caso della Gallura. (in Italian). Universitat de Barcelona 2013.
- Gams, Pius Bonifatius (1873). Series episcoporum Ecclesiae catholicae: quotquot innotuerunt a beato Petro apostolo (in Latin). Ratisbon: Typis et Sumptibus Georgii Josephi Manz. pp. 832–833.
- Kehr, Paul Fridolin. Italia Pontificia (in Latin), Vol. X: Calabria – Insulae (Turici: Weidmann 1975). (pp. 422–423; 436-437).
- Mattei, Antonio Felice (1758). Sardinia sacra seu De episcopis Sardis historia nunc primò confecta a F. Antonio Felice Matthaejo. (in Latin). Romae: ex typographia Joannis Zempel apud Montem Jordanum, 1758. Pp. 275-280.
- Oliva, Anna Maria (1996). "La diocesi di Civita all'epoca dei re cattolici," (in Italian), in: Da Olbìa ad Olbia. 2500 anni di storia di una città mediterranea, Chiarella Editrice, Sassari 1996, pp. 277–289.
- Pintus, Sebastiano (1908). "Vescovi di Fausania, Civita, Ampurias, Ampurias e Civita, oggidì di Ampurias e Tempio," (in Italian), in: Archivio storico sardo Vol. 4 (Cagliari 1908), pp. 97–115.
- Floris, Francesco (ed.) (2007). La Grande Enciclopedia della Sardegna, vol. 3, Sassari: Editoriale La Nuova Sardegna 2007, pp. 29–30

==== External links ====
- Gabriel Chow, GCatholic.org, "Diocese of Civitate-Tempio" (& precursors)
