= Berchidda =

Berchidda Belchidda (Logudorese) Bilchidda (Gallurese)
- Comune
- Comune di Berchidda
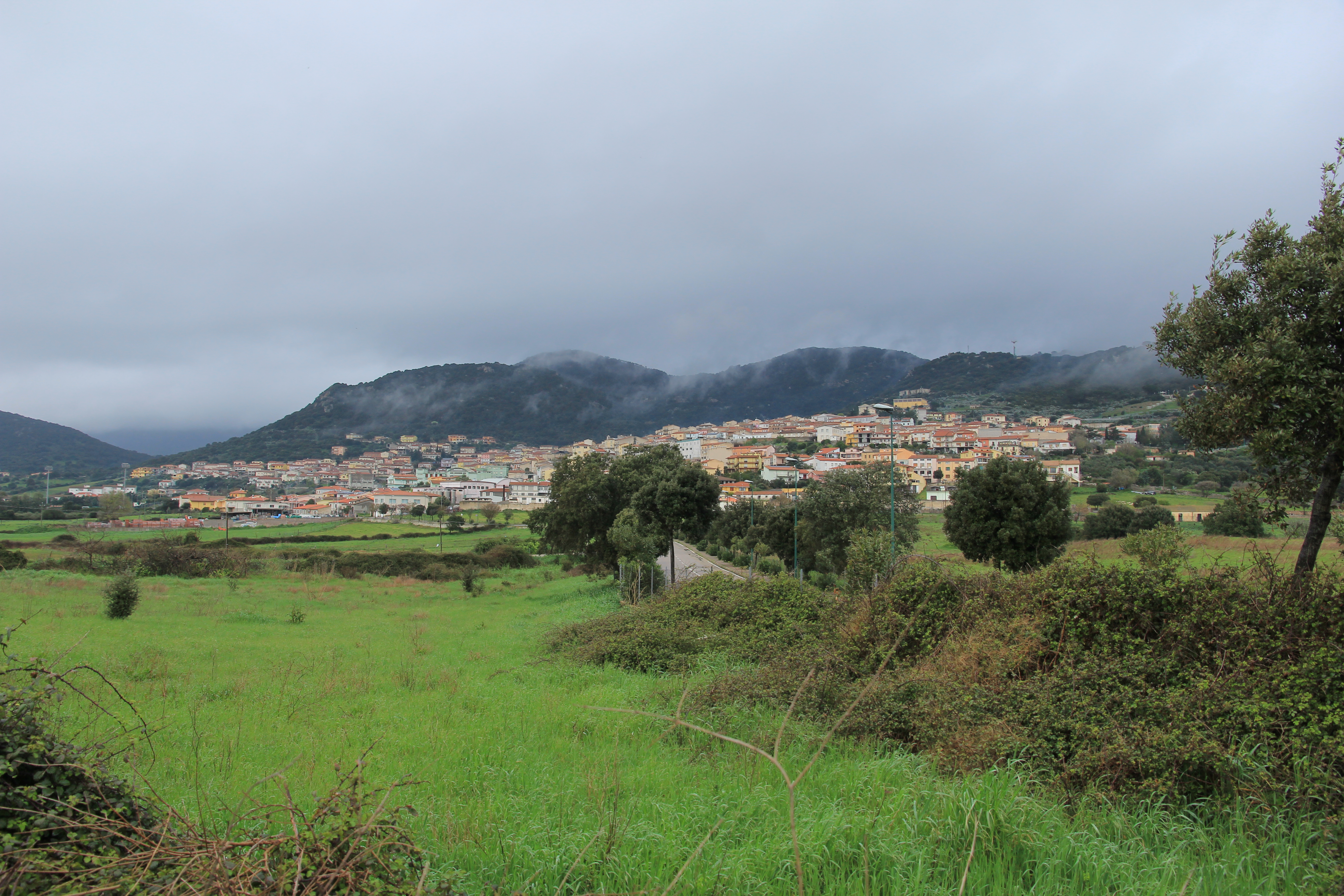
- Panorama of Berchidda

- Location within Sardinia
- Coordinates: 40°47′N 9°10′E
- Country: Italy
- Region: Sardinia
- Province: Gallura North-East Sardinia

Government
  - Mayor: Andrea Nieddu

Area
  - Total: 201.88 km^{2} (77.95 sq mi)

Population (2026)
  - Total: 2,604
  - Density: 12.90/km^{2} (33.41/sq mi)
- Demonym(s): Italian: berchiddese Sardinian: belchiddesu / belchiddesa
- Time zone: UTC+1 (CET)
  - Summer (DST): UTC+2 (CEST)
- Postal code: 07022
- Dialing code: 079
- Patron saint: St. Sebastian
- Saint day: 20 January
- Website: Official website

Berchidda (Italian: [berˈkidda]; Logudorese: Belchidda [belˈkiɖːa]; Gallurese: Bilchidda) is a town and comune (municipality) in the Province of Gallura North-East Sardinia in the autonomous island region of Sardinia in Italy, located about 170 kilometres (110 mi) north of Cagliari and about 30 kilometres (19 mi) southwest of Olbia. It has 2,604 inhabitants.

It is located near Lake Coghinas in a hilly area bordered on the north by the Limbara mountain range. Berchidda borders the municipalities of Alà dei Sardi, Calangianus, Monti, Oschiri, and Tempio Pausania.

== Demographics ==
As of 2026, the population is 2,604, of which 49.5% are male, and 50.5% are female. Minors make up 12.1% of the population, and seniors make up 28.4%.

Historical population

| Year | Pop. | ±% |
|---|---|---|
| 1861 | 1,333 | — |
| 1871 | 1,402 | +5.2% |
| 1881 | 1,579 | +12.6% |
| 1901 | 2,125 | +34.6% |
| 1911 | 2,323 | +9.3% |
| 1921 | 2,769 | +19.2% |
| 1931 | 2,923 | +5.6% |
| 1936 | 3,018 | +3.3% |

| Year | Pop. | ±% |
|---|---|---|
| 1951 | 3,428 | +13.6% |
| 1961 | 3,576 | +4.3% |
| 1971 | 3,261 | −8.8% |
| 1981 | 3,374 | +3.5% |
| 1991 | 3,353 | −0.6% |
| 2001 | 3,177 | −5.2% |
| 2011 | 2,897 | −8.8% |
| 2021 | 2,634 | −9.1% |

Source: ISTAT

=== Immigration ===
As of 2025, immigrants make up 4.0% of the total population. The 5 largest foreign countries of birth are Romania, France, Morocco, Switzerland, and Germany.

== Culture ==
A jazz festival called Time in Jazz takes place every year in Berchidda since 1988. Paolo Fresu, the Sardinian trumpet player, born in Berchidda in 1961, is the founder and the organizer of this festival.

== Transport ==
It is connected by the SS 131 State Road and has a station on the Cagliari-Olbia-Golfo Aranci railway.
