= Gemelli University Hospital =

General hospital in Rome, Italy

Coordinates: 41.9303°N 12.4297°E

Geography
- Location: Rome, Lazio, Italy

Organisation
- Type: General
- Affiliated university: Università Cattolica del Sacro Cuore

Services
- Emergency department: Yes
- Beds: 1,575

History
- Founded: 1964

Links
- Website: policlinicogemelli.it
- Lists: Hospitals in Italy

The Gemelli University Hospital (Italian: Fondazione Policlinico Universitario Agostino Gemelli) is a large general hospital in Rome, Italy. With 1,575 beds, it is the second-largest hospital in Italy, the largest hospital in Rome and one of the largest private hospitals in Europe. It serves as the teaching hospital for the medical school of the Università Cattolica del Sacro Cuore, and owes its name to the university founder, the Franciscan friar, physician and psychologist Agostino Gemelli. The hospital provides free medical assistance as part of the Italian national health system as well as paid-for private assistance in dedicated hotel-style wards.

== History and structure ==
Construction began in 1959 under the direction of architect Giuseppe Cigni on the hill of Monte Mario in Rome, and the hospital opened its doors in July 1964. The hospital hosts facilities for both basic and clinical research, on-site housing for medical students, canteens, cafeterias, one restaurant, one bookshop and two medical libraries.

Undergraduate and postgraduate Medical studies, Nursing sciences, Physiotherapy and a variety of other clinical subjects takes place at the main building. Four further buildings are open to the public: the "Biological Institutes", the "Protected Health Residence", the combined "Institute of Infectious Diseases" and "Centre for the Medicine of Aging".

In the early 2000s, a new building was added to the main facility, which houses the Accident and Emergency department, most of the operating theatres and several laboratories. The buildings are surrounded by parks and meadows. The original manorial villa, built long before the site was chosen to build the hospital and previously used as a convent, now serves as the Institute of Bioethics, as well as the main university Church.

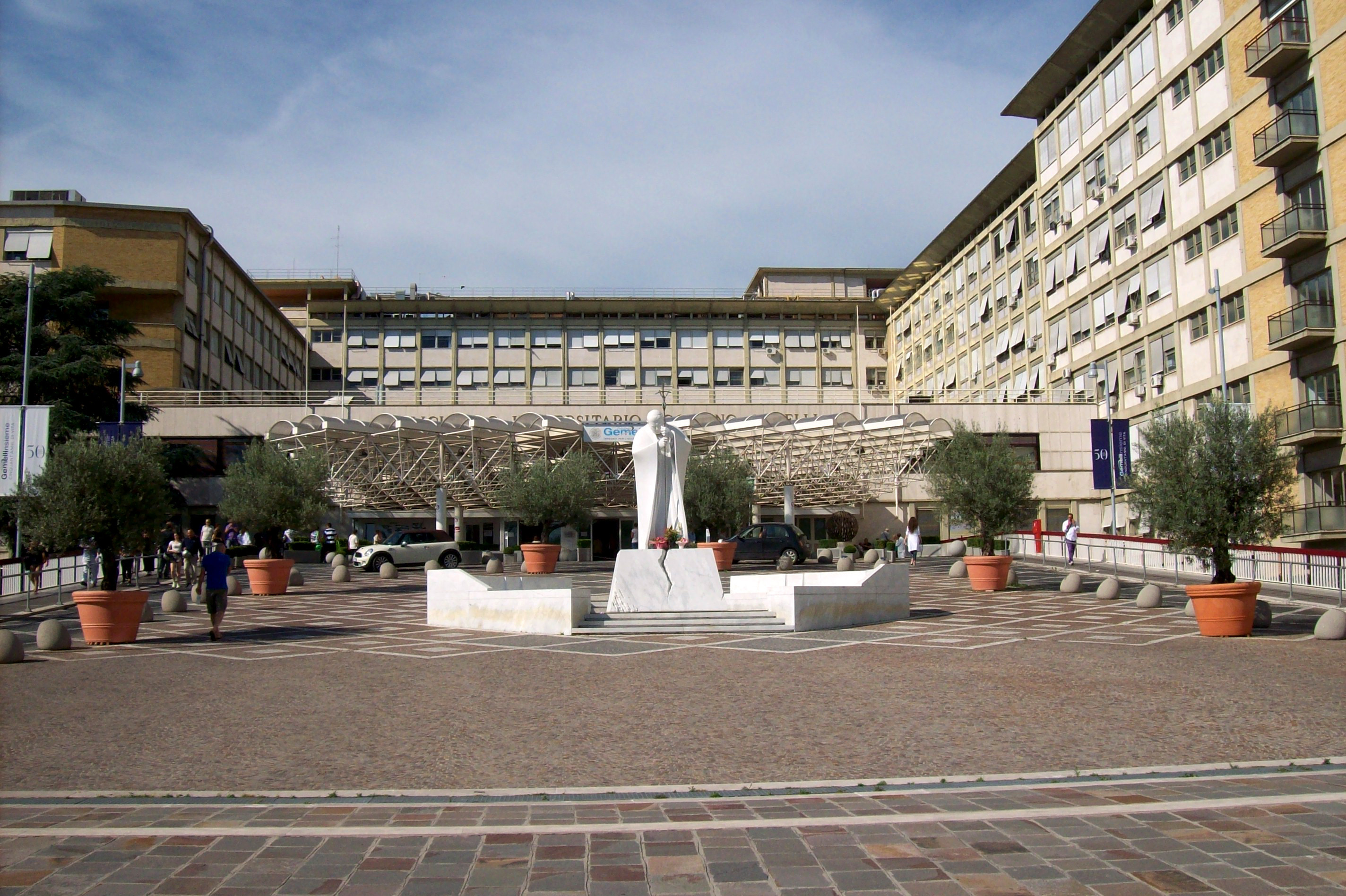
Main entrance to the hospital with the statue of Pope John Paul II

== Organizational model and activity ==
Since 2015, the Hospital is organized into 21 areas grouped in 8 departments, whose aim is to coordinate healthcare, training, education and research roles assigned to the areas they cover. The Hospital uses "Critical Pathways" to map, integrate and assess every phase involved in providing care for key health problems.

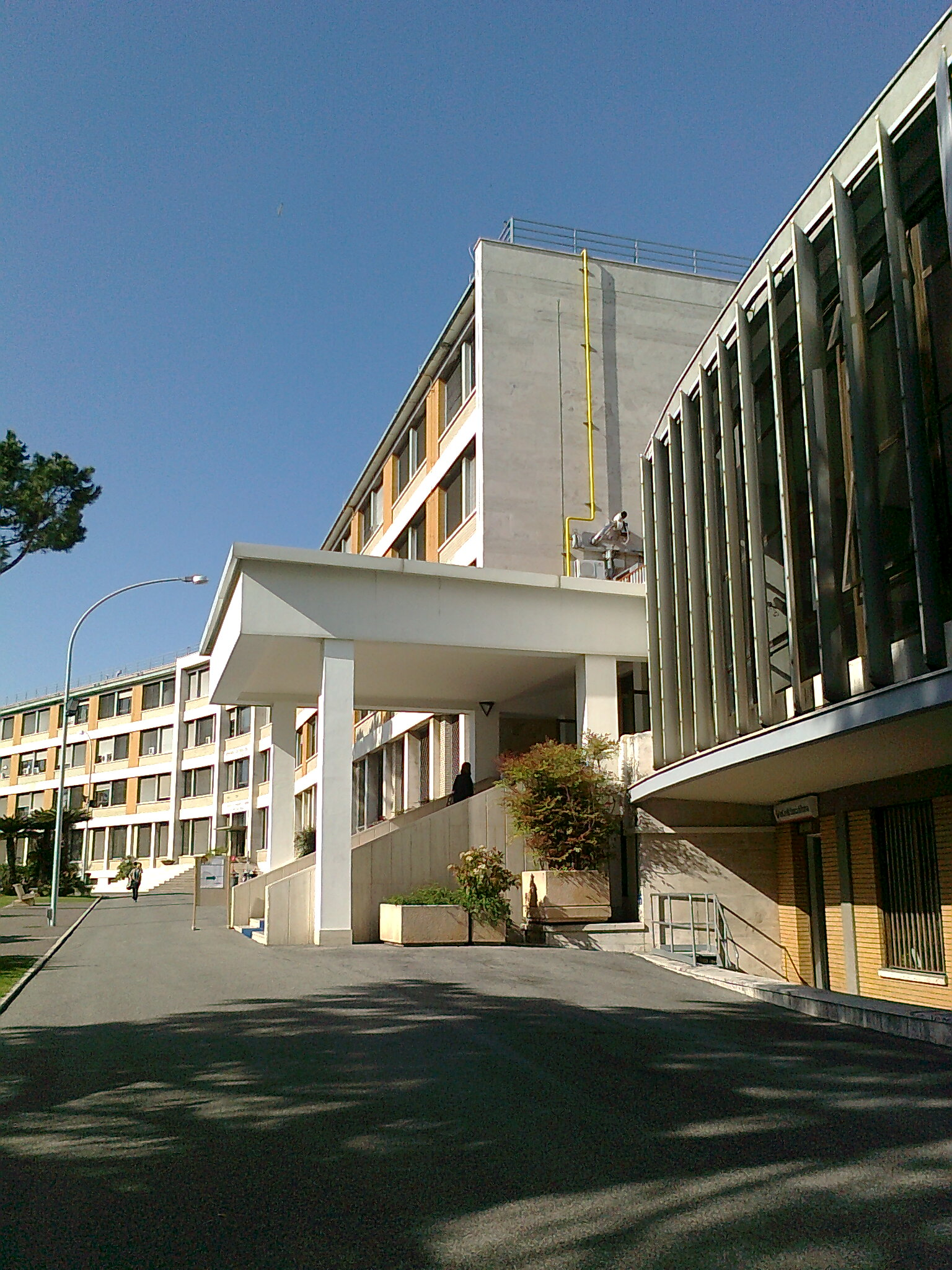
Auditorium

In 2015 alone, almost 95,000 patients were hospitalised and more than 45,000 surgical operations were conducted. 80,000 patients were treated in the Emergency Department, 10,000 blood dialysis sessions and more than 6 million radiological procedures were conducted. The hospital staff includes more than 5,000 employees, of whom there are almost 1,000 physicians and more than 2,000 nurses. Every day, the hospital premises and the whole campus host an estimated number of 30,000 people.

Each year the hospital consumes around 50 million kWh and 16 million cubic metres of natural gas. Its co-generation system provides around 60% of the energy that is needed for electricity, heating and cooling, making it one of the largest infrastructures of this kind in the civil and hospital sectors in Italy. Compliance with existing regulations have resulted in the Hospital obtaining ISO 50001 certification from the Bureau Veritas agency. Gemelli Hospital was the first teaching hospital in Italy ever to receive this certification.

The hospital and the university are focused on research: in 2015 alone, 1500 scientific papers were published, with 323 scientific experiments underway and 17 patents developed by internal researchers thanks to €16,000,000 in research fundings, provided by Italian, European and international agencies.

== Advanced technologies and areas of excellence ==
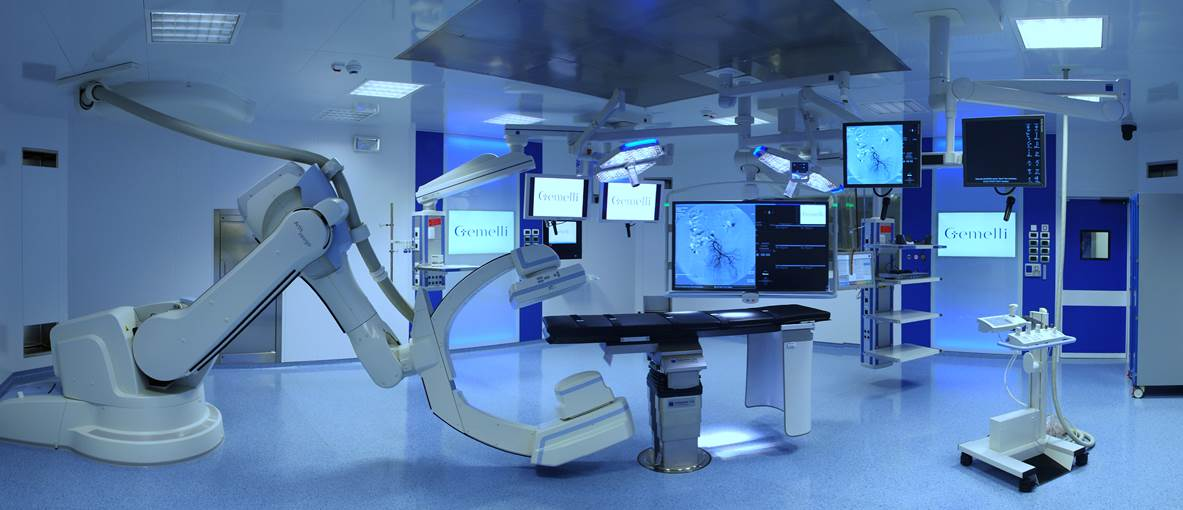
Hybrid operating room for cardiovascular surgery at the Gemelli Hospital

Since 2015, the hospital has hosted one of the largest and newest hybrid operating theatres in Europe, a highly specialised Oncological Radiotherapy Center (Gemelli ART) in Italy and the NEMO (NeuroMuscular Omnicentre) Clinical Center, which specializes in caring for people affected by neuromuscular diseases including Amyotrophic lateral sclerosis (ALS), Spinal muscular atrophy (SMA) and Muscular Dystrophies. More recently, a 1,200 sq m center dedicated to medical, surgical and diagnostic simulation (IPSE Center, Interactive Patient Simulation Experience) was inaugurated.

The Gemelli is one of Italy’s top centres for colorectal tumours, as well as tumours of the stomach, liver, biliary system and pancreas, and also for transplants. The Endocrinology-Metabolic Diseases Area has clinical-surgical units specialised in managing the main endocrine and metabolic illnesses. The hospital boasts one of Italy’s leading case statistics in terms of management and medical-surgical therapy for diseases of the thyroid, adrenal gland and pituitary gland. The mortality rate for cardiac surgery is among the lowest in Italy.

== MediCinema ==
In 2015, in collaboration with the MediCinema Italy Onlus, the Hospital completed and inaugurated the 130 seats MediCinema theatre which can accommodate patients in wheelchairs and beds. It is the first hospital in Italy to have premises set aside for “cinematherapy” and relief therapy for patients and their family members.

== Partnership with Qatar Foundation Endowment ==
In July 2017, Qatar Foundation Endowment (QFE) and Agostino Gemelli University Policlinic announced the signing of an agreement for the management of the Mater Olbia Hospital in Olbia, Sardinia. The hospital, acquired by QFE through the European investment platform in May 2015, underwent major structural and technological interventions that led to its opening in 2019.

== Popes and other notable patients ==
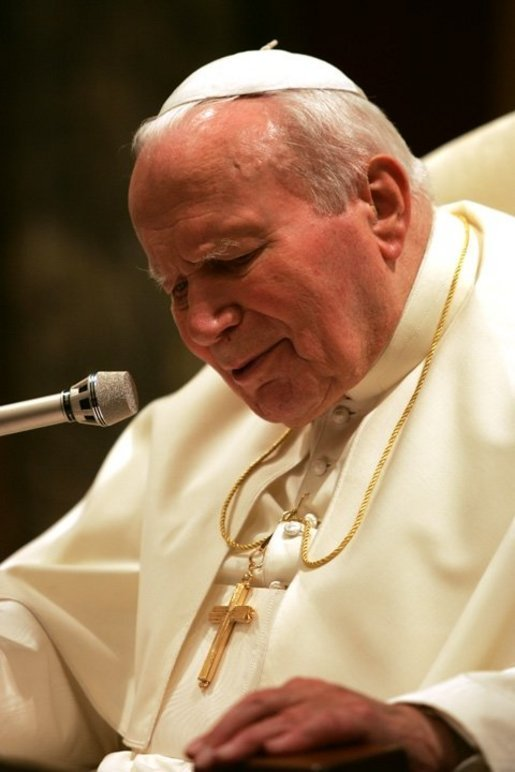
Pope John Paul II was repeatedly treated at the Gemelli Hospital

The Gemelli became the focus of international attention during the pontificate of Pope John Paul II who, in 1981, received emergency surgery after Mehmet Ali Ağca's failed assassination attempt. He returned at various times, up to a few weeks before his death in 2005.

Pope Francis was admitted to the hospital four times. He had colon surgery for his diverticular disease at the hospital in 2021. The hospital also treated Francis twice in 2023, first for a respiratory infection and several months later for abdominal surgery to treat a hernia. In 2024, after coming down with influenza, he underwent diagnostic tests at Gemelli. In February 2025, Francis was admitted to the hospital for treatment of a respiratory infection. Upon discharge from the hospital on 24 March, Francis returned to the Vatican where he died on 21 April.

In October 2026, Pope Leo XIV underwent successful surgery at Gemelli University Hospital for a nodule in his lung. After the procedure, Pope Leo was diagnosed with lung adenocarcinoma. The diagnosis had been suspected during preoperative tests and was confirmed during surgery. Oncologists say his prognosis is “excellent” because the nodule is expected to have been detected at an early stage.

Other famous ex-patients include politicians Giulio Andreotti, Walter Veltroni and Francesco Cossiga, Nobel Peace Prize laureate Mother Teresa, theoretical physicist Stephen Hawking, priest Georg Ratzinger (elder brother of Pope Benedict XVI), footballers Francesco Totti and Daniele De Rossi and Canadian filmmaker Damian Pettigrew to name a few. In June 2009 a statue of Pope John Paul II was unveiled in front of the hospital building.
