= List of presidents of the Province of Gallura North-East Sardinia =

President of the Province of Gallura North-East Sardinia
- Presidente della Provincia della Gallura Nord-Est Sardegna

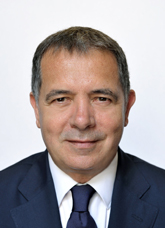
- Incumbent; Settimo Nizzi since 30 September 2025
- Term length: 4 years

The president of the Province of Gallura North-East Sardinia is the head of the provincial government in Gallura North-East Sardinia, Italy. The president oversees the administration of the province, coordinates the activities of the municipalities, and represents the province in regional and national matters.

Since September 2025, the office has been held by Settimo Nizzi of Forza Italia.

== History ==
The office of president of the Province of Gallura North-East Sardinia is the successor of the corresponding office of the former Province of Olbia-Tempio. The latter was established in 2001 as part of the reorganization of the provinces of Sardinia and became operational after the first provincial elections held in 2005. The president was elected directly by citizens every five years. The province was abolished in 2016 as part of the regional reorganization of Sardinian provinces.

In 2021, the Autonomous Region of Sardinia approved the establishment of the new Province of North-East Sardinia, later renamed Province of Gallura North-East Sardinia, which became operational on 1 April 2025. The first election of the president and provincial council of the new province was held on 29 September 2025, resulting in the election of Settimo Nizzi as the first president of the re-established provincial institution.

== List ==
=== Presidents of Olbia-Tempio (2005–2016) ===
No.	Portrait	Name	Term of office		Party
No.	Portrait	Name	Start	End	Party
1		Anna Pietrina Murrighile	9 May 2005	31 May 2010	Sardinia Project; Democratic Party
2		Fedele Sanciu	31 May 2010	1 July 2013	The People of Freedom
–		Francesco Pirari (Special Commissioner)	1 July 2013	30 April 2014	—
–		Giovanni Antonio Carta (Special Commissioner)	30 April 2014	20 April 2016	—

=== Presidents of Gallura North-East Sardinia (2025–present) ===
No.	Portrait	Name	Term of office		Party
No.	Portrait	Name	Start	End	Party
–		Gaspare Piccinnu (Extraordinary Administrator)	29 September 2024	30 September 2025	―
1		Settimo Nizzi	30 September 2025	Incumbent	Forza Italia

== Sources ==
- "Storia amministrativa dell'ente". Ministero dell'Interno.
