= Mount Limbara =

Mountain in Italy

Coordinates: 40°50′59″N 9°10′31″E

Limbara
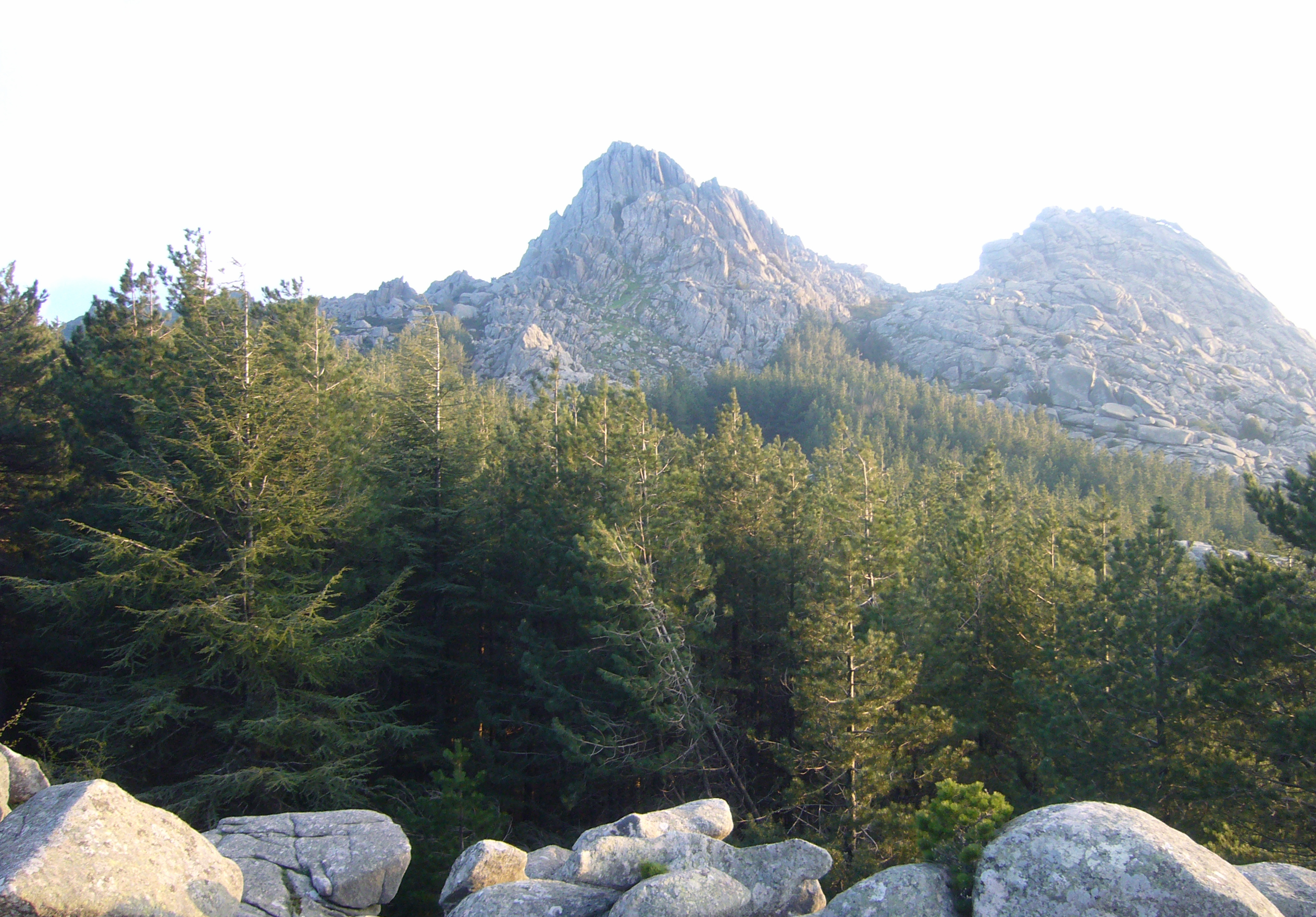
- Mount Limbara

Highest point
- Peak: Punta Sa Berritta
- Elevation: 1,362 m (4,469 ft)
- Prominence: 1,066 m (3,497 ft)
- Isolation: 70.72 km (43.94 mi)
- Listing: Ribu

Naming
- Native name: Monti di Limbara (Gallurese); Monte de Limbara (Sardinian)

Geography
- Location within Italy
- Country: Italy
- Region(s): province of Sassari, Sardinia, Italy

Mount Limbara (Gallurese: Monti di Limbara, Sardinian: Monte de Limbara) is a rocky granitic massif in northeastern Sardinia, Italy. It is located in the geographical and historical region of Gallura.

Its highest peak is Punta Sa Berritta (1,362 m above sea level). Its area belongs to the comuni of Calangianus, Tempio Pausania, Berchidda and Oschiri, in the province of Olbia-Tempio.

The flora of Mount Limbara estimated to 1,147 taxa grouped in 46 orders, 120 families and 486 genera. The wildlife of the mount includes wild boar, foxes, martens, weasels, mouflon, wild cats, Sardinian hare, wild rabbits, Bonelli's eagle and peregrine falcon.

== History ==
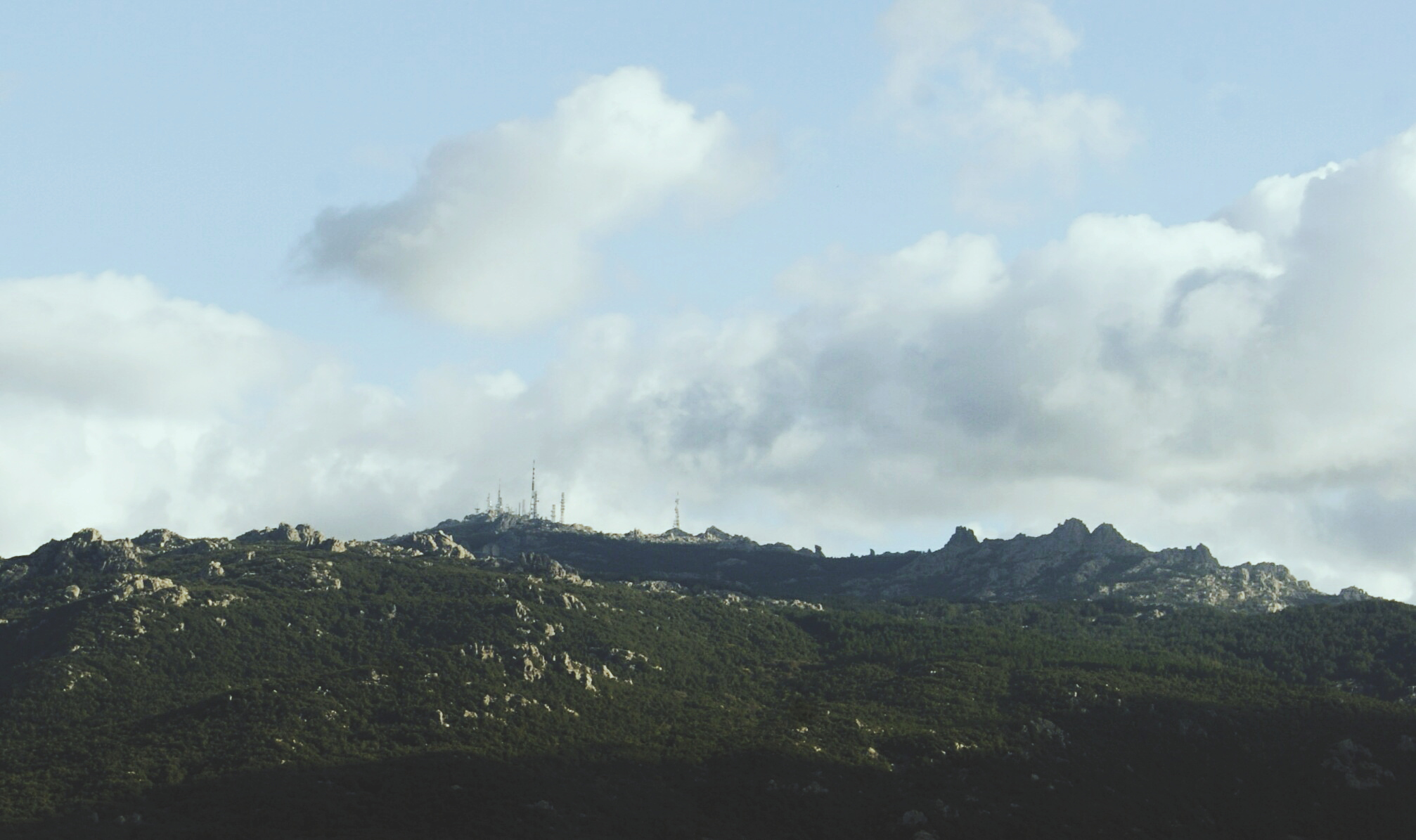

The name could derive from the Latin Limes Balares ("Boundary of the Balares"), given it by the Romans as it marked the frontier with the territory still in the hands of the Balares, a late Nuragic tribe.

Mount Limbara was affected by a major forest fire in 1936 and its cork oaks woods were replaced with pines, after a work of reforestation. Following World War II, giant sequoias were planted as well.

=== Cold War communications center ===
On the top of the massif, a NATO U.S. Air Force Cold War Communications Relay Station and a Carabinieri barracks were located. Six original antenna dishes remain. Today it is used as a telecommunications center for the Italian Air Force and a heliport for the Servizio Antincendi. It is also the location of all the major TV relay stations of West Sardinia.
