= Mater Olbia Hospital =

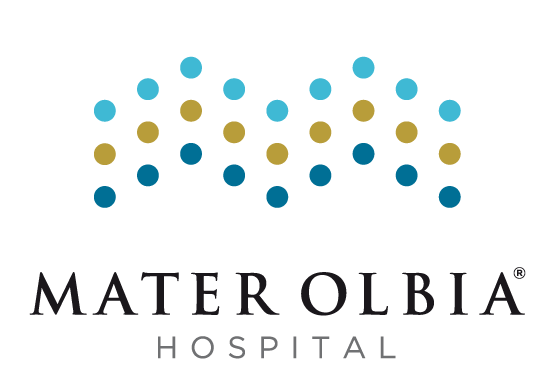

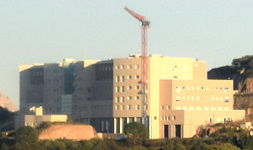

Geography
- Location: Olbia, Northeastern Sardinia, Italy

Services
- Beds: 248

History
- Constructed: 2017
- Opened: 2018

Links
- Website: materolbia.com
- Lists: Hospitals in Italy

The Mater Olbia Hospital (MOH) is a Polyclinic in the city of Olbia in the Italian insular Metropolitan City of Sassari. It was formed as a result of partnership between the Qatar Foundation Endowment and Fondazione Policlinico Universitario Agostino Gemelli IRCCS in Rome.

== History ==
In 2017, The Qatar Foundation (QFE) and the Fondazione Policlinico Universitario Agostino Gemelli IRCCS announced an agreement regarding the management of the Mater Olbia Hospital in Olbia. By December 2018, the first clinics are operational.

In July 2019, Mater Olbia Hospital was fully operational with total 248 beds, 202 of which had an agreement with the National Health System and 46 reserved for private care.

In 2020, the Sardinia Regional Council (Giunta Regionale) selected the Mater Olbia Hospital as COVID-19 structure for the area of North Sardinia. Next month, following the constant and progressive improvement of the regional and national epidemiological situation, Mater Olbia Hospital ceases its function as a COVID-19 Structure. In June 2020, the hospital signed an agreement with the soccer clubs of Cagliari and Olbia Calcio to provide to their athletes high-level health services.

In June 2020, the Italian Embassy in Doha, Qatar Foundation and Hamad Medical Corporation signed an agreement in order to transfer in Italy several plasma samples from patients who recovered from COVID-19 in Qatar. The aim of the Qatar-Italy scientific project is to find evidence that CP contains sufficient levels of neutralizing antibodies to successfully treat COVID-19 patients. The samples were analyzed at the University Cattolica del Sacro Cuore in Italy, with the Sardinia-based Mater Olbia Hospital then verified the data, in order to studying how the human immune system responds to CP, and determining different types of SARS-CoV-2 – the coronavirus strain that causes COVID-19 - antibodies.

== Departments and services ==
The Mater Olbia Hospital has following departments: Anaesthesia and intensive care, Cardiology, Endocrinological and Bariatric Surgery, General Surgery, Endocrinology, Physiatry: Post-acute Rehabilitation and Neuroriability, Gastroenterology and digestive endoscopy, Gynaecology and Senology, Laboratory Medicine, Neurosurgery, Neurology and Stroke Unit, Orthopaedics and Traumatology, Otorhinolaryngology (ENT) - Head neck and Radiology.

Mater Olbia Hospital provides outpatient services as part of the accreditation with the National Health System.

== Operations and structure ==
Mater Olbia Hospital's research has been around minimally invasive, safe and precise surgical treatments available to the patients. The Mater Olbia Hospital's operating rooms are equipped with high definition vision (4K Vision), three-dimensional vision (3D) and intraoperative angiographic fluorescence vision.

Among the equipment in use are

- the Revolution EVO, designed to support the widest variety of patients and applications, from complex trauma to cardiac cases.
- the biplane's neuroangiographic technology that enables Mater Olbia Hospital to provide potentially life-saving care with speed and precision. Its accuracy is essential for intervention in sensitive neurological procedures and improved visualizations of the neovascularisation of the brain and spine
- a full field digital mammography in which the X-ray film is replaced by solid state detectors that convert X-rays into electrical signals. The clearer image of this device improves interpretation, making it easier to view dense breast tissue and small tumours and often eliminates the need for additional follow-up images

Mater Olbia Hospital has a full field digital mammography in which the X-ray film is replaced by solid state detectors that convert X-rays into electrical signals. The clearer image of this device improves interpretation, facilitating the visualization of dense breast tissue and small tumours and often eliminates the need for additional follow-up images.

The "Senology Diagnostic Centre" (Centro diagnostico di senologia) has conventional devices (such as mammography, tomosynthesis, ultrasound, etc.) and advanced including Automated breast ultrasound (ABUS), Contrast-enhanced spectral mammography (CESM) and magnetic resonance imaging (MRI).

== See also ==
- Università Cattolica del Sacro Cuore
