= Settimo Nizzi =

Italian politician (born 1957)

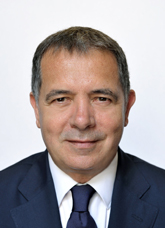

President of the Province of Gallura North-East Sardinia
- Incumbent
- Assumed office 30 September 2025
- Preceded by: Office established

Mayor of Olbia
- Incumbent
- Assumed office 21 June 2016
- Preceded by: Gianni Giovannelli
- In office 16 November 1997 – 27 May 2007
- Preceded by: Giommaria Uggias
- Succeeded by: Gianni Giovannelli

Member of the Chamber of Deputies
- In office 29 April 2008 – 14 March 2013
- In office 25 June 2014 – 7 July 2016

Personal details
- Born: 11 January 1957 (age 69) Olbia, Province of Sassari, Italy
- Party: Forza Italia
- Education: University of Sassari
- Profession: Physician

Settimo Nizzi (born 11 January 1957) is an Italian physician and politician serving as president of the Province of Gallura North-East Sardinia and mayor of Olbia. He previously served as a member of the Chamber of Deputies.
