= Montalbo =

- Municipality
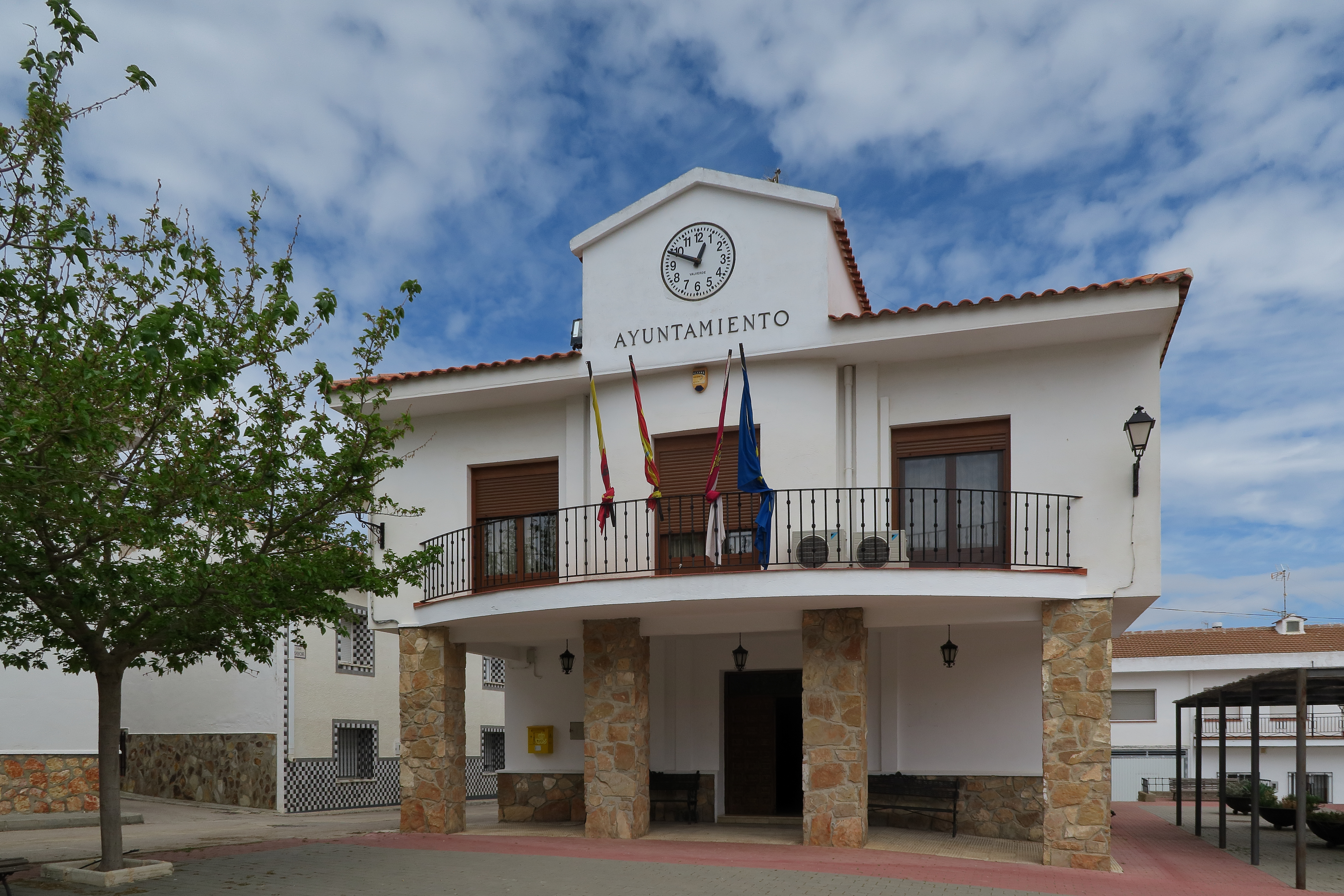
- Montabo - Town hall

- Flag Coat of arms

- Location within Spain Location within Castilla-La Mancha
- Coordinates: 39°52′55″N 2°41′8″W
- Country: Spain
- Autonomous community: Castile-La Mancha
- Province: Cuenca

Population (2025-01-01)
  - Total: 703
- Time zone: UTC+1 (CET)
  - Summer (DST): UTC+2 (CEST)

Montalbo is a municipality in the province of Cuenca, part of the autonomous community of Castile-La Mancha, in the country of Spain.
