= Basilica of San Simplicio, Olbia =

Basilica in northern Sardinia, Italy

Coordinates: 40°55′31.8″N 9°29′47.8″E

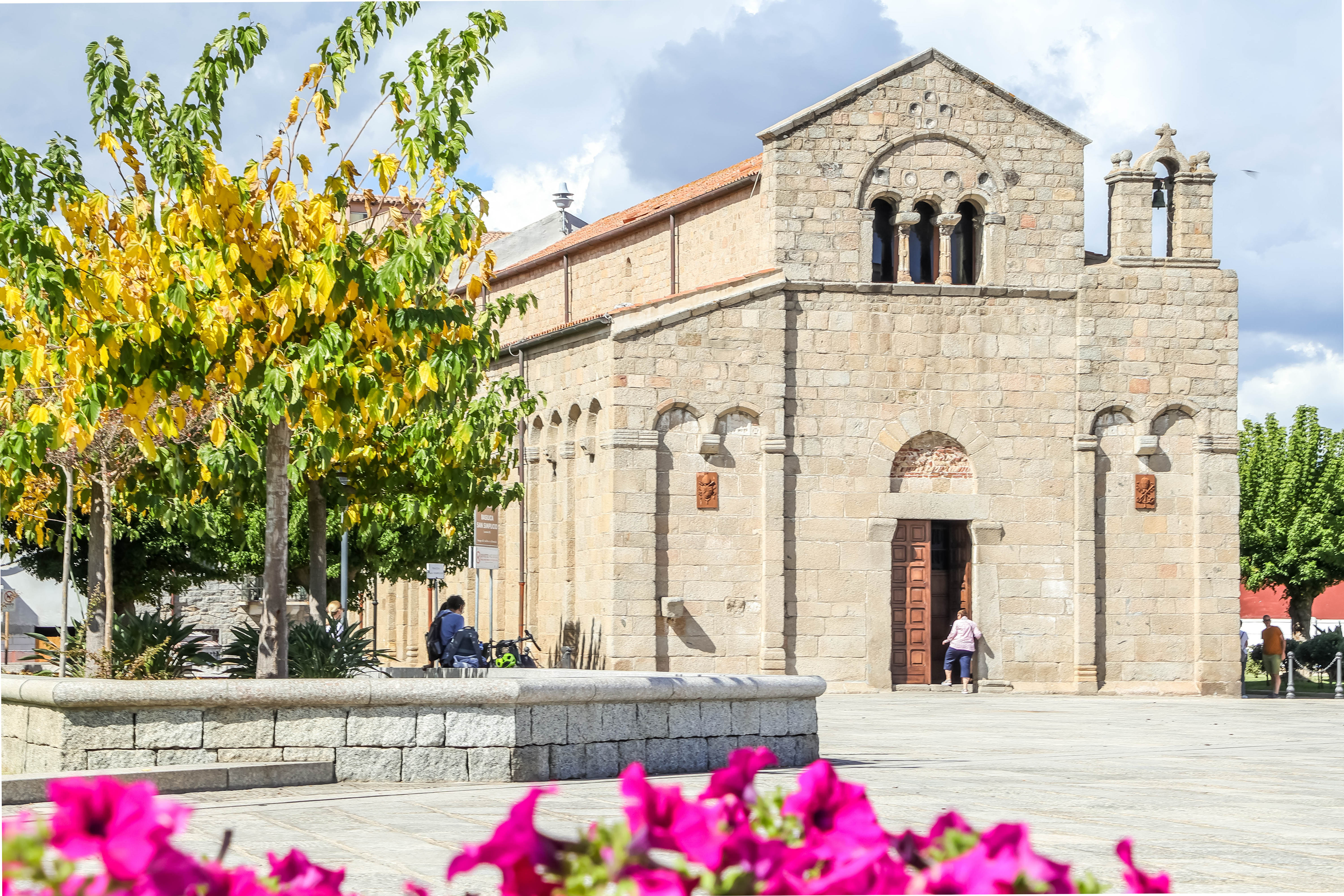
The Basilica of San Simplicio.

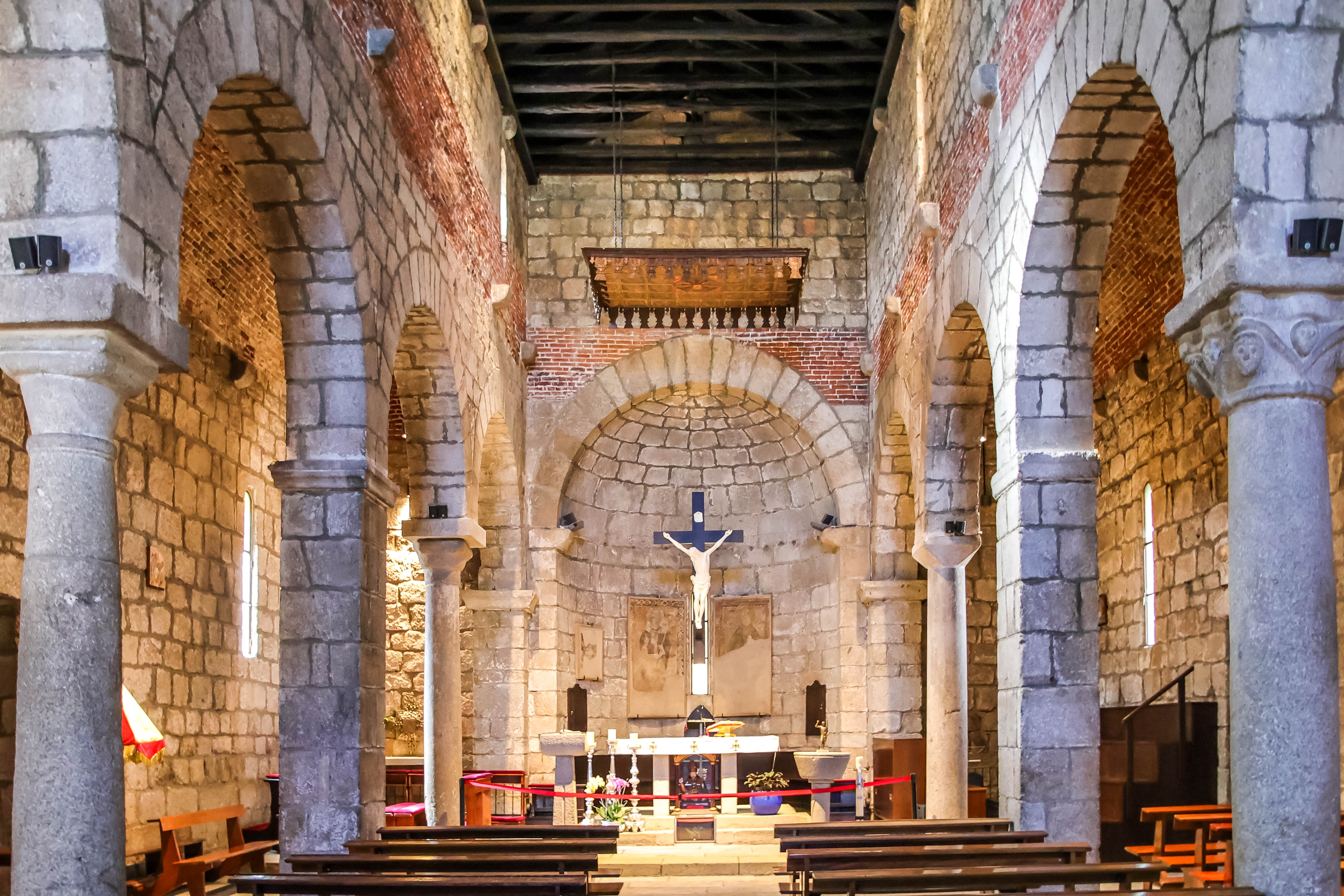
Interior of San Simplicio

The Basilica of San Simplicio is a Basilica in Olbia, northern Sardinia, Italy.

It was built in the late 11th century on a small hill, once located outside the city walls, used since the Carthaginian times as a cemetery area. In the area already existed a Palaeo-Christian church, built most likely between 594 and 611, which in turn was located near a Roman temple. The apse, the walls and most of the internal columns were finished in the 11th century; the barrel vault of the aisles and the upper parts of the side walls were built in the early 12th century, while the façade was completed in the middle of that century.

== Exterior ==
The church has a façade divided into three parts by two fake columns, with a central triple mullioned window with marble columns; the small bell tower on the right is in Spanish style and is a late addition dating to the Spanish rule of Sardinia. on the left of the façade is inserted an early mediaeval marble slab from another edifice, perhaps portraying Christ entering Jerusalem, or a clash of knights.

The apse is decorated with small corbels, and is surmounted by a large pediment.

The interior, showing the granite construction of the basilica, is on a nave and two aisles divided by columns and piers. In the middle of the apse are two ruined frescoes, depicting St. Simplicius and Victor of Fausania, who was bishop of Olbia after 595 and is considered a saint only in this city. Under the altar are the relics of Simplicius, discovered in 1614 while excavating the church's crypt.

The church was granted the title and privileges of a "minor basilica" by Pope John Paul II in 1993.

== Sources ==
- Panedda, Dionigi (1959). Olbia attraverso i secoli. Cagliari: Fossataro.
