= Olbia =

Olbia Terranoa (Sardinian) Tarranoa (Gallurese)
- Comune
- Comune di Olbia
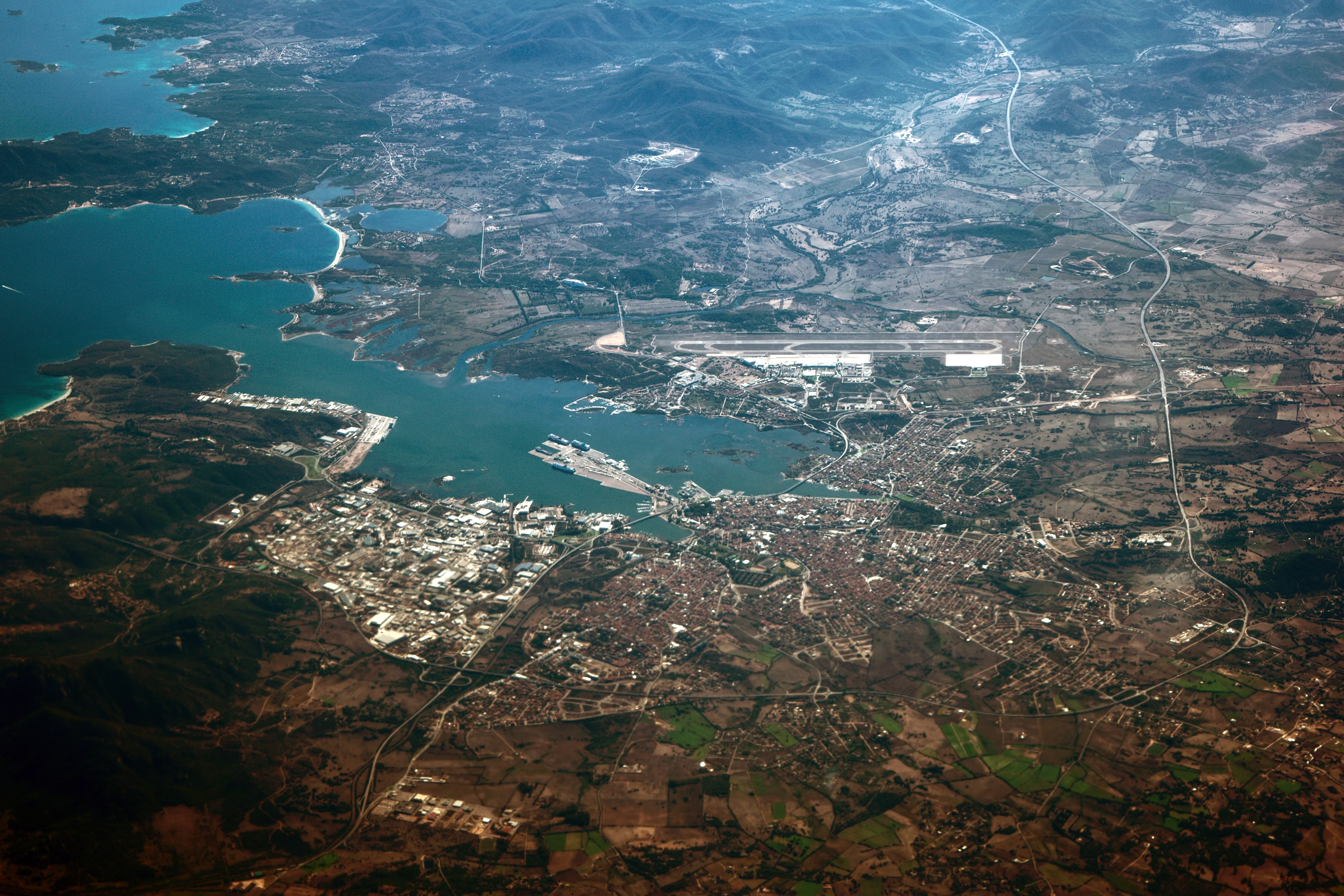
- November 2014 aerial photograph of Olbia. The airport and the harbour are both visible.

- Flag Coat of arms

- Location within Sardinia
- Coordinates: 40°55′N 09°30′E
- Country: Italy
- Region: Sardinia
- Province: Gallura North-East Sardinia
- Frazioni: Berchiddeddu, Murta Maria, Pittulongu, Rudalza-Porto Rotondo, San Pantaleo

Government
  - Mayor: Settimo Nizzi

Area
  - Total: 383.64 km^{2} (148.12 sq mi)

Population (2026)
  - Total: 61,739
  - Density: 160.93/km^{2} (416.81/sq mi)
- Demonym: Olbiesi
- Time zone: UTC+1 (CET)
  - Summer (DST): UTC+2 (CEST)
- Postal code: 07026
- Dialing code: 0789
- Patron saint: St. Simplicius
- Saint day: May 15
- Website: Official website

Olbia (Italian: [ˈɔlbja], locally [ˈolbja]; Sardinian: Terranoa; Gallurese: Tarranoa) is a city and comune (municipality), which along with Tempio Pausania is a co-capital of the Province of Gallura North-East Sardinia in the autonomous island region of Sardinia in Italy, in the historical region of Gallura. It has 61,739 inhabitants.

== Name ==
Called Olbia in the Roman age, Civita in the Middle Ages (Judicates period) and Terranova Pausania until the 1940s, Olbia has again been the official name of the city since the fascist period.

== History ==
Although the name is of Greek origin, due to the Greek presence during the seventh century B.C., the city of Olbia was first settled either by the Nuragics or by Phoenicians, according to the archaeological findings. It contains ruins from the Nuragic era to the Roman era, when it was an important port, and the Middle Ages, when it was the capital of the Giudicato of Gallura, one of the four independent states of Sardinia. During the First Punic War, the Romans fought against the Carthaginians and the Sardinians near Olbia, where the general Hanno died in battle.

From 1113 it was the episcopal see of the Diocese of Cività (succeeding to the Diocese of Gallura, the 1070 restoration of the Diocese of Fausania, c. 500–750), which was renamed in 1839 as Diocese of Civita–Tempio until its formal suppression in favor of (in fact merger into) the Diocese of Tempio–Ampurias (also integrating the Diocese of Ampurias, which was in personal union with the see of Civita from 1506).

== Geography ==
It is the economic centre of this part of the island (commercial centres, food industry) and is very close to the Costa Smeralda tourist area. It was one of the administrative capitals of the province of Olbia-Tempio, operative since 2005 and canceled after a referendum seven years later. Olbia is a tourist destination thanks to its sea and beaches and also for the large number of places of cultural interest to visit.

=== Climate ===
Olbia has a Mediterranean climate (Csa), with mild winters, warm springs and autumns and hot summers.

Climate data for Olbia, Sardinia (1981–2010)
Month	Jan	Feb	Mar	Apr	May	Jun	Jul	Aug	Sep	Oct	Nov	Dec	Year
Record high °C (°F)	25.1 (77.2)	24.5 (76.1)	28.0 (82.4)	27.8 (82.0)	35.0 (95.0)	39.9 (103.8)	47.4 (117.3)	41.0 (105.8)	38.3 (100.9)	33.3 (91.9)	29.0 (84.2)	24.0 (75.2)	47.4 (117.3)
Mean daily maximum °C (°F)	13.7 (56.7)	14.2 (57.6)	16.3 (61.3)	18.7 (65.7)	23.3 (73.9)	27.9 (82.2)	31.3 (88.3)	31.3 (88.3)	27.4 (81.3)	23.2 (73.8)	18.0 (64.4)	14.7 (58.5)	21.7 (71.0)
Daily mean °C (°F)	9.5 (49.1)	9.6 (49.3)	11.5 (52.7)	13.6 (56.5)	17.7 (63.9)	22.0 (71.6)	25.3 (77.5)	25.4 (77.7)	21.8 (71.2)	18.1 (64.6)	13.5 (56.3)	10.6 (51.1)	16.6 (61.8)
Mean daily minimum °C (°F)	5.3 (41.5)	5.1 (41.2)	6.6 (43.9)	8.4 (47.1)	12.0 (53.6)	16.1 (61.0)	19.3 (66.7)	19.4 (66.9)	16.3 (61.3)	13.0 (55.4)	9.1 (48.4)	6.5 (43.7)	11.4 (52.6)
Record low °C (°F)	−3.6 (25.5)	−3.0 (26.6)	−2.5 (27.5)	−1.0 (30.2)	3.9 (39.0)	7.0 (44.6)	12.0 (53.6)	10.0 (50.0)	8.9 (48.0)	4.0 (39.2)	−1.4 (29.5)	−4.2 (24.4)	−4.2 (24.4)
Average precipitation mm (inches)	47.3 (1.86)	72.6 (2.86)	63.4 (2.50)	56.1 (2.21)	37.4 (1.47)	18.4 (0.72)	6.4 (0.25)	28.1 (1.11)	40.8 (1.61)	58.4 (2.30)	55.6 (2.19)	97.9 (3.85)	582.4 (22.93)
Average precipitation days	7	8	8	8	4	3	1	3	5	5	6	9	67
Average relative humidity (%)	70	69	65	66	66	58	60	63	67	65	72	72	66
Mean monthly sunshine hours	127	138	186	213	279	312	360	316	249	195	138	118	2,631
Source 1: Istituto Superiore per la Protezione e la Ricerca Ambientale
Source 2: Aeronautica Militare

== Demographics ==
Historical population
Year	Pop.	±%
1861	3,042	—
1871	3,393	+11.5%
1881	4,073	+20.0%
1901	5,487	+34.7%
1911	7,123	+29.8%
1921	8,045	+12.9%
1931	10,860	+35.0%
1936	11,377	+4.8%
1951	14,601	+28.3%
1961	17,727	+21.4%
1971	24,290	+37.0%
1981	30,787	+26.7%
1991	41,095	+33.5%
2001	45,366	+10.4%
2011	53,307	+17.5%
2021	60,711	+13.9%
Source: ISTAT

As of 2026, the population is 61,739, of which 49.5% are male, and 50.5% are female. Minors make up 14.8% of the population, and seniors make up 20.6%.

=== Immigration ===
As of 2025, immigrants make up 12.0% of the total population. The 5 largest foreign countries of birth are Romania, Senegal, Argentina, Morocco, and Germany.

Foreign population by country of birth (2025)
Country of birth	Population
Romania	2,023
Senegal	456
Argentina	394
Morocco	379
Germany	323
France	313
Albania	304
Poland	264
Ukraine	243
Pakistan	220
Switzerland	185
Brazil	146
China	142
Egypt	126
Belgium	123

== Main sights ==
Map of the city center

- Romanesque former cathedral of San Simplicio (11th–12th century).
- Church of St. Paul Apostle (medieval)
- National Archaeology Museum
- Pedres Castle
- Several dolmens and a menhir
- Several nuraghes
- Remains of the Roman forum and aqueduct
- Remains of Carthaginian walls
- Fausto Noce park, the largest in Sardinia
- River park of Padrongianus
- Tavolara island

== Sport ==
Olbia Calcio 1905 represents Olbia in Serie D, the fourth division of Italian football. Olbia hosted several legs of Aquabike World Championship (powerboating) in 2003, 2004, 2018, 2019.

== Transport ==
Olbia is one of the main connections between Sardinia and the Italian peninsula, with an airport (Olbia – Costa Smeralda), a passenger port (Olbia-Isola Bianca), and a railway from Olbia railway station to Porto Torres, Golfo Aranci and Cagliari. There is an expressway to Nuoro and Cagliari (SS131) and national roads to Sassari (SS199-E840), Tempio Pausania (SS127) and Palau (SS125).

=== Local transport ===
The internal city public transport and bus connections with the surrounding areas are provided by the ASPO (Olbia's public service company), while vehicle connections with the other centers of the territory are provided by the ARST (Sardinian regional transport company). Other private carriers operate with lines under concession.

== Hospitals ==
The major hospitals in the area are:

- "Giovanni Paolo II" Hospital - Olbia
- "Paolo Dettori" Hospital - Tempio Pausania
- "Paolo Merlo" Hospital - La Maddalena
- Mater Olbia Hospital - Olbia

== Gallery ==
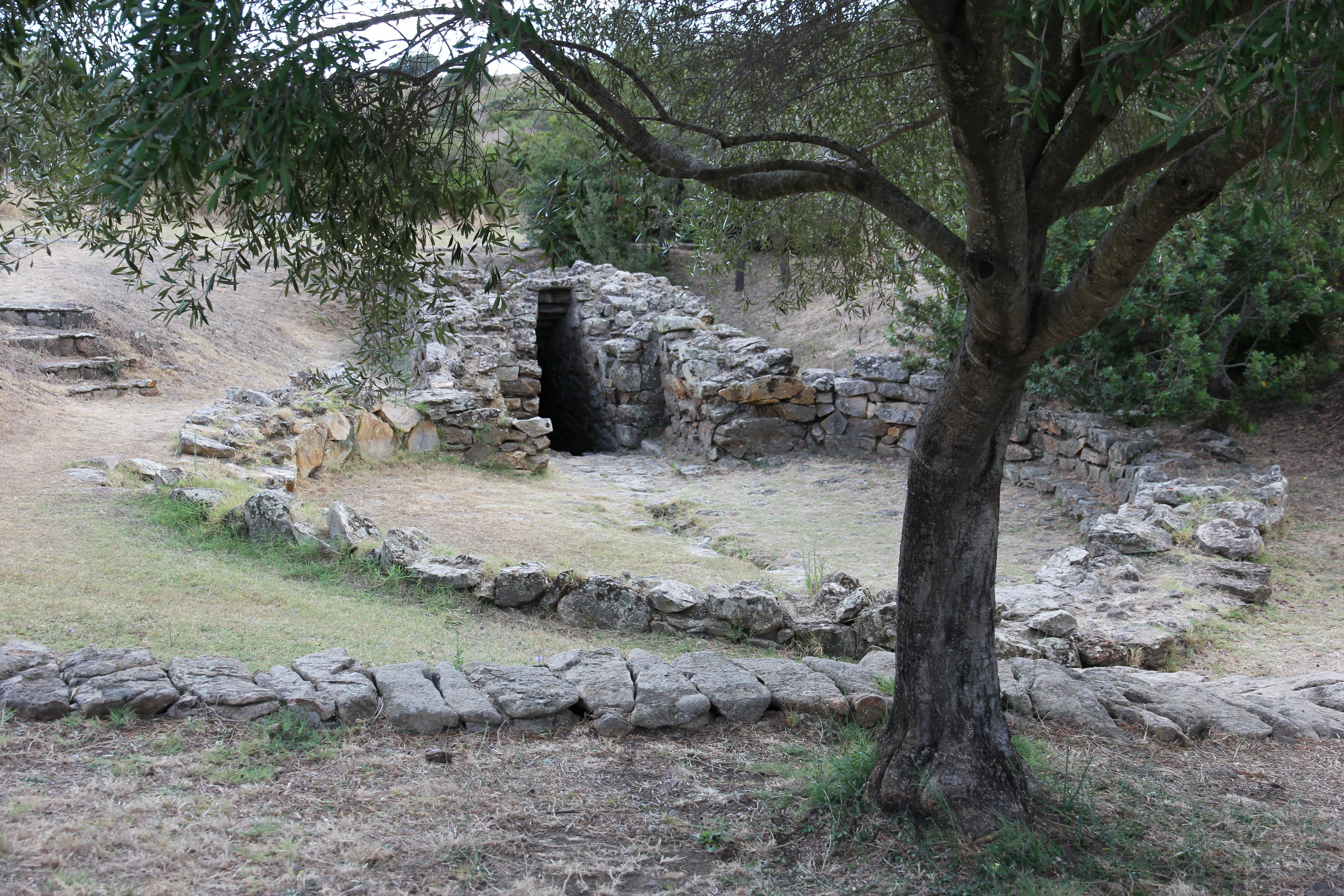
Nuragic holy well temple of Sa testa

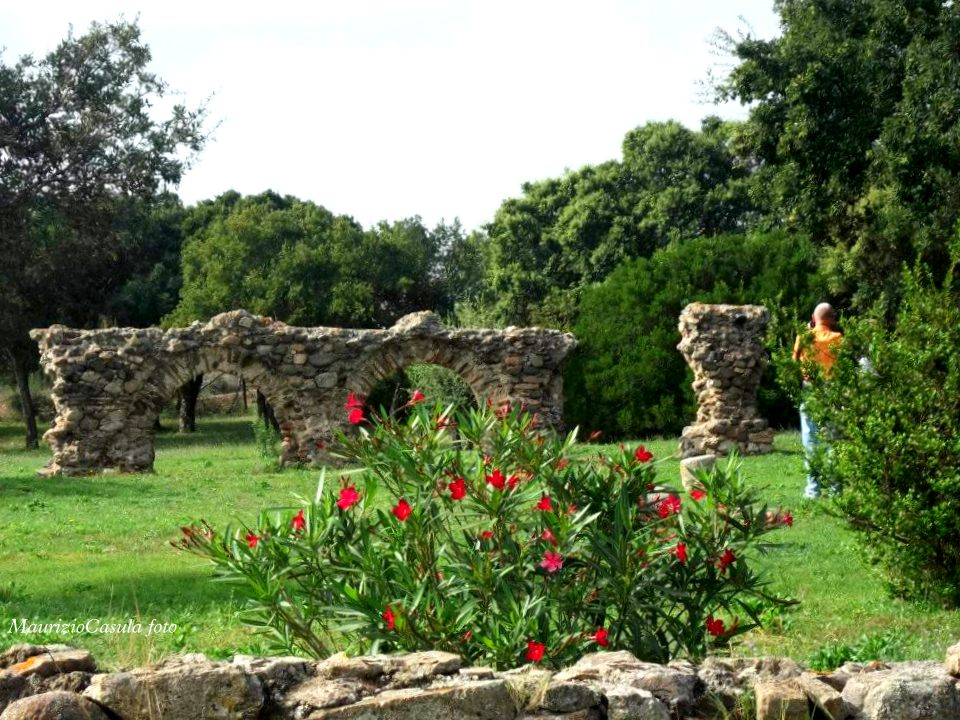
Ruins of the Roman aqueduct

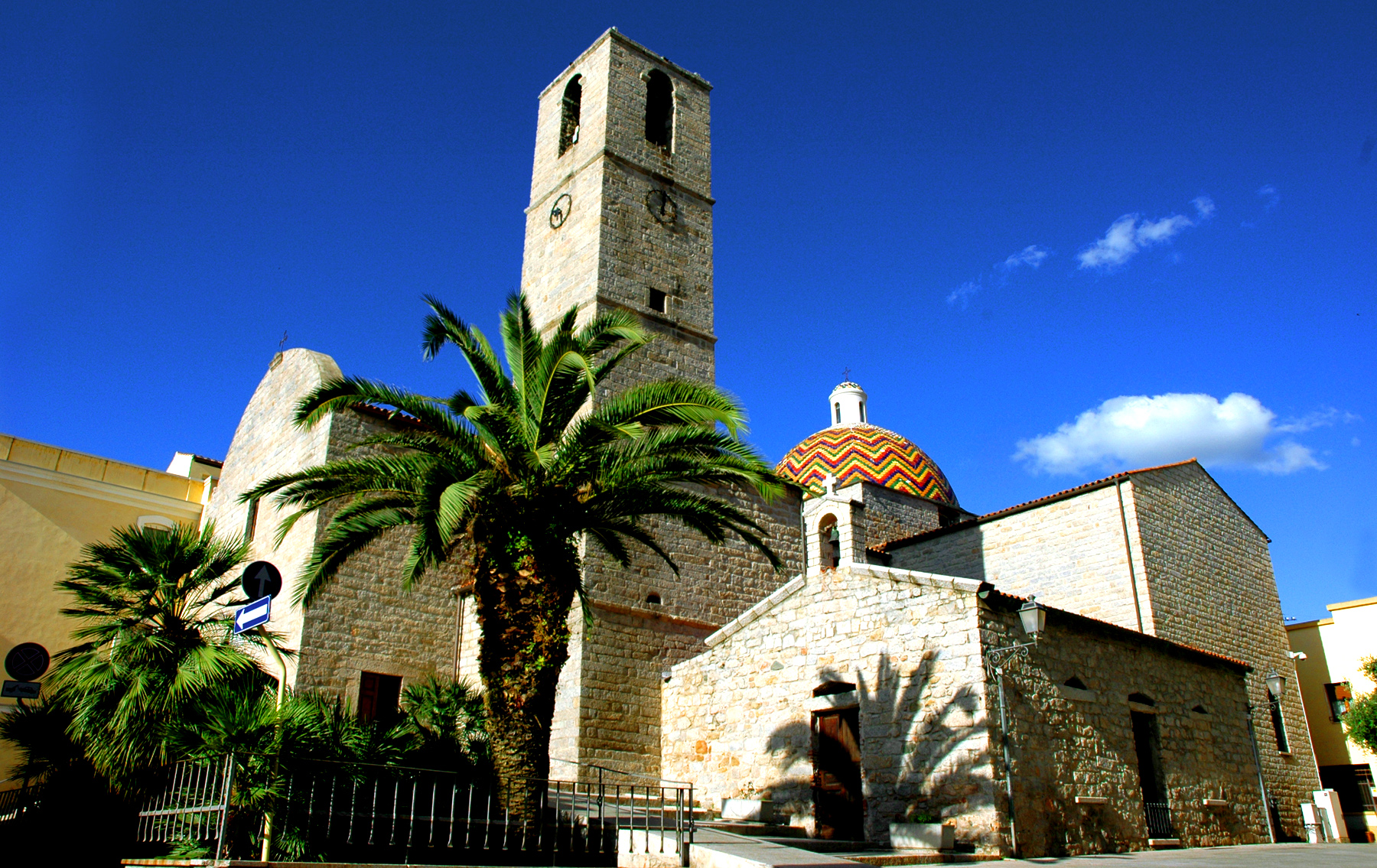
The church of S.Paolo of Olbia

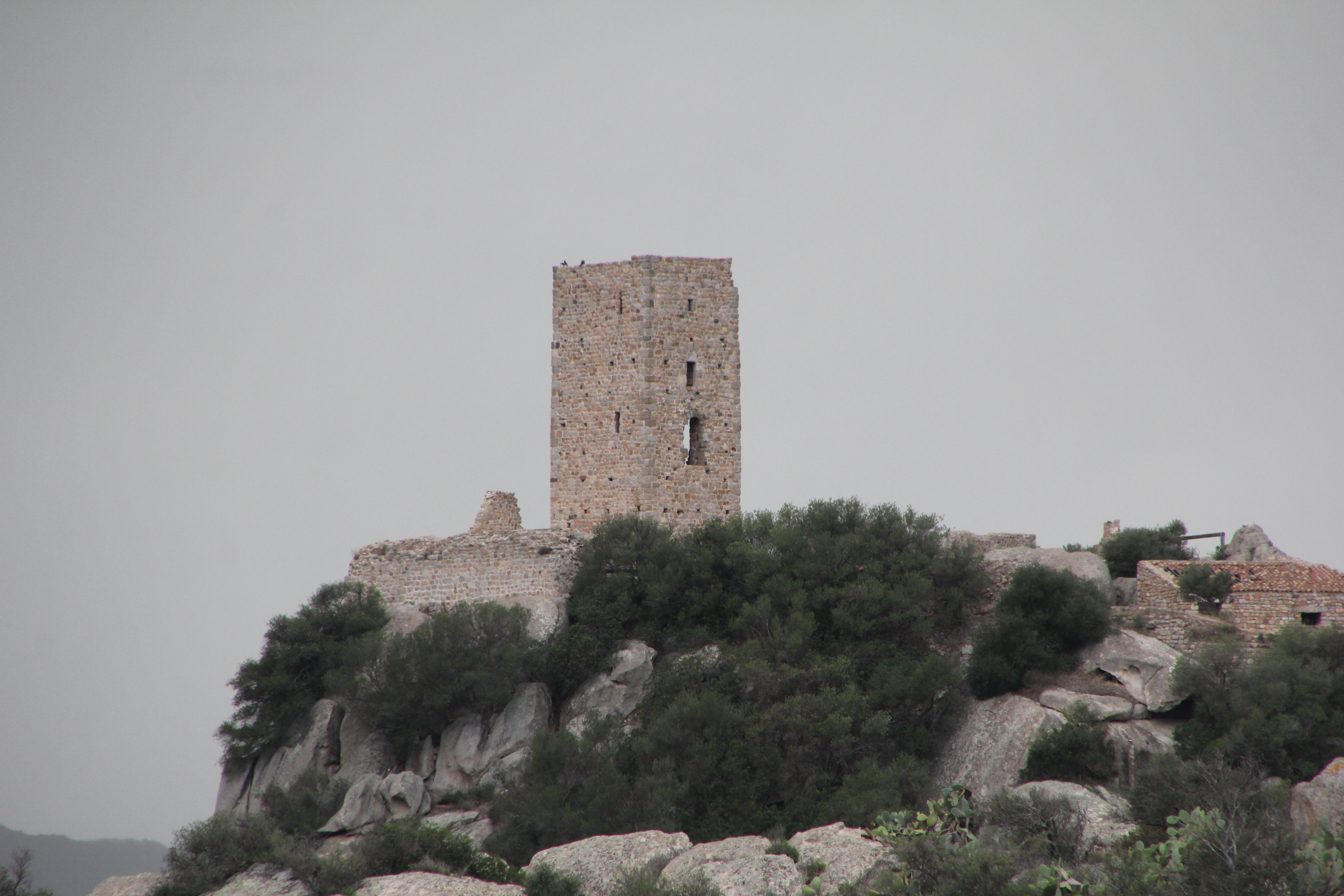
Olbia, castle of Pedres

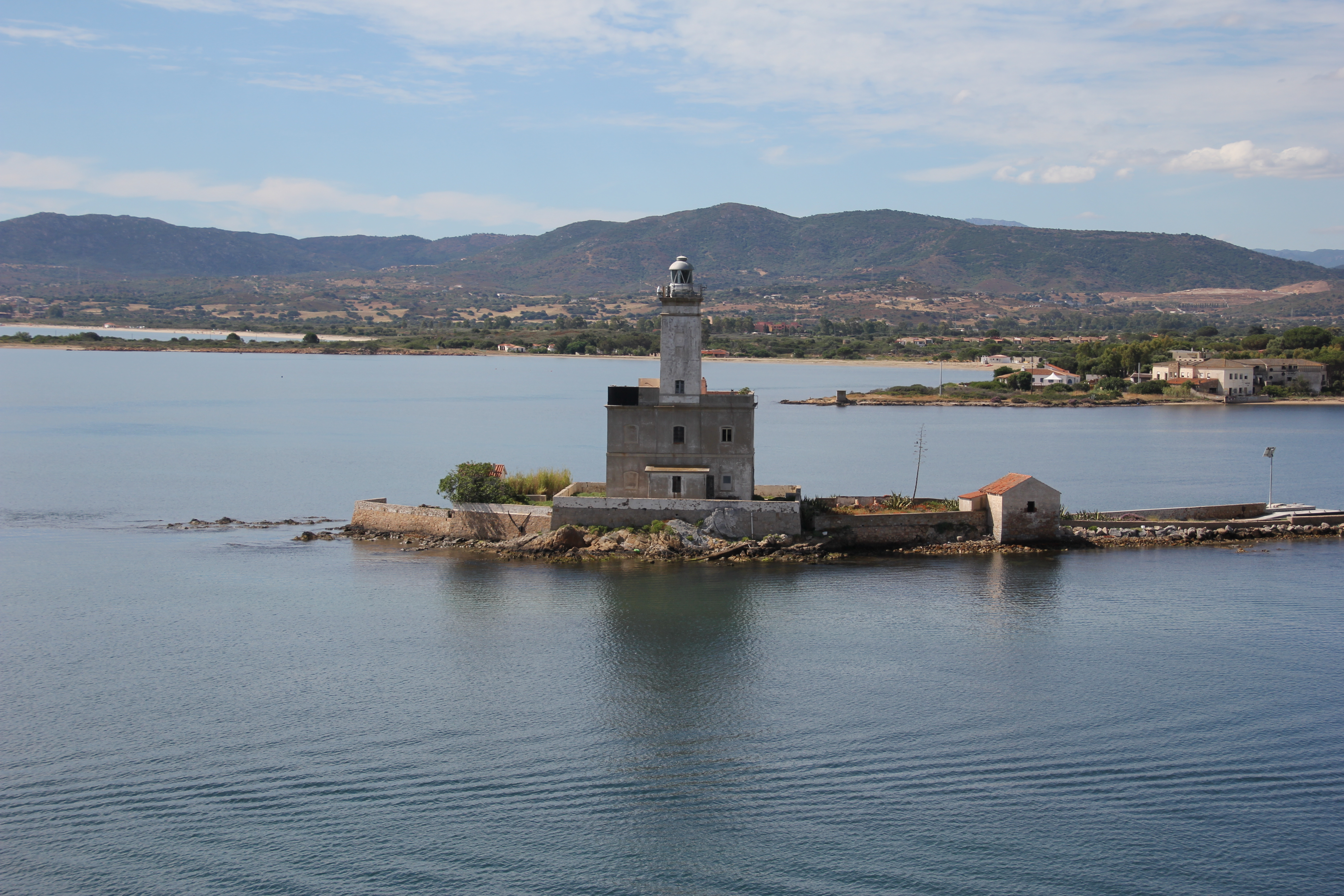
Lighthouse
