= Diocese of Ampurias =

The Roman Catholic Diocese of Ampurias was a Latin suffragan Catholic bishopric in the north of Sardinia (Italy, Tyrrhenian Sea) from 1070 till its suppression and merger with the Diocese of Civita-Tempio (which kept the cathedral see) into the present Roman Catholic Diocese of Tempio-Ampurias.

== History ==
The bishopric of Ampurias, also known as Diocese of Flumen ('the stream' in Latin), was founded circa 1170, like the Diocese of Gallura (later renamed Civita), plausibly when Pope Alexander II reorganized the ecclesiastical jurisdictions of Sardinia, which was being temporally divided into four autonomous giudicati ('judgedoms'), corresponding to the administrative curatorial of Anglona in the Giudicato of Torres, as suffragan of the Metropolitan Archdiocese of Torres.

Its original episcopal see, Amurias, was an Ancient port town, presumably at the coast of Codaruìna near Valledoria by the bay of Coghinas. Its original cathedral was dedicatated to the Apostle Peter, (now?) called San Pietro Mare ('Saint Peter by the Sea').

The first historically recorded Bishop of Ampurias, Bono, had a part around 1100 in the foundation of the monastery of San Nicolò di Solio, one of many founded in the diocese by the Cassinese Benedictine Congregation in the 11th and 12th centuries, thirteen of which depended on Santa Maria di Tergu; whether their possessions ware exempt from the episcopal authority remained a matter of continuous dispute, giving to several papal interventions in favor of the Benedictines, possibly culminating in the murder of the abbot of Santa Maria di Tergu shortly before 1203.

According to the Rationes decimarum (mid 14th century), the diocese comprised 21 plebanies and rectories (parishes). The town of Ampurias faded with its port due to the sand-clogged bay of Coghinas, so in the 14th century the episcopal see was effectively transferred (without title change) to Castelgenovese (now Castelsardo), formalized in 1503 when Pope Julius II elevated the Benedictine priory of Sant'Antonio into the new diocesan cathedral, which presently remains co-cathedral in the successor bishopric.

From 1506, the see of Ampurias was held in personal union (aeque principaliter) with the Diocese of Civita, until they merged effectively on 1986.09.30, both formally being suppressed in favor of the (present) Diocese of Tempio–Ampurias (with cathedral see at Tempio Pausania, in former Civita) as suffragan of the Metropolitan Archdiocese of Sassari.

== Suffragan Bishops of Ampurias ==
- Bono (1100? – 1106?)
- Nicola (1106 – 1120)
- Gilito (1149? – 1154?)
- Archbishop-bishop Comita de Martis (1170? – 1179?), previously Metropolitan Archbishop of Oristano (Italy) (1146? – 1170?)
- Pietro (1205? – ?)
- Gennadio (1231? – ?)
- Guglielmo (1255? – ?)
- Giovanni (1269? – ?)
- Summachio (1278? – ?)
- Gonario (1283? – death 1300?)
- Bartolomeo de Malague (1301.03.10 – 1332)
- Lorenzo da Viterbo, Dominican Order (O.P.) (1329 – 1344), also Bishop of Diocese of Civita (1330 – 1340?)
- Giacomo (1332 – 1333)
- Bernardino Rossi, Friars Minor (O.F.M.) (1344.06.14 – ?)
- Matteo (1348? – ?)
- Raimondo, O.P. (1349 – 1351.06.10)
- Arduino (1353 – 1355)
- Bertrando, O.P. (1355 – 1365.09.12), next Bishop of Larino (Italy) (1365.09.12 – 1368?)
- Pietro di San Martino, O.F.M. (1365 – 1386?)
  - uncanonical: obedient to the Antipope at Avignon : Pietro (1379 – 1387)
- Nicola (1386 – ?)
- Marco (1386 – 1386)
  - uncanonical: obedient to the Antipope at Avignon : Egidio da Murello (1393 – ?)
- Pietro (1395 – 1401), next Bishop of Ajaccio (Corsica, now France) (1401 – 1411)
- Pietro Benedetto di Giovanni (1401 – 1413)
- Tommaso di Bobbio (1413 – 1428)
- Gavino (1428 – death 1443)
- Sisinnio (1443.07.05 – 1448.10.23), previously Bishop of Sulci (1442.11.19 – 1443.07.05); later Bishop of Bisarcio (1448.10.23 – death 1466)
- Gonario Gadulese (1448.09.23 – death 1449)
- Gileto Esu (1449.10.01 – 1455)
- Antonio de Alcalá (1457.05.16 – 1457?)
- Nicola de Campo (1458.10.27 – death 1479)
- Ludovico di Giovanni, O.F.M. (1480.08.20 – death 1486)
- Diego de Nava, Augustinian Order (O.E.S.A.) (1486.10.02 – death 1493)
- Francesco Manno (1493.11.27 – 1511), also Bishop of Diocese of Civita (Italy) (1506.06.05 – 1511)

from 1506 in personal union ('aeque principaliter') with the Diocese of Civita, hence see there for their common incumbents

== See also ==
- List of Catholic dioceses in Italy

== Sources and external links ==
- GCatholic - former diocese, with incumbent bio links - data for all sections
- GCatholic - co-cathedral
- beweb.chiesacattolica.it - present (successor) Diocese of Tempio-Ampurias

Bibliography

- Antonio Felice Mattei, Sardinia sacra seu De episcopis sardis historia, Rome 1761, pp. 117–119 (Fausania), pp. 180–191 (Ampurias) & pp. 275–280 (Civita)
- Giuseppe Cappelletti, Le Chiese d'Italia della loro origine sino ai nostri giorni, vol. XIII, Venice 1857, pp. 155–171
- Pietro Martini, Storia ecclesiastica di Sardegna, vol. III, Cagliari 1841, pp. 349–353
- Enciclopedia della Sardegna, vol. 1, Sassari 2007, pp. 156–159
- Diocese of Ampurias, in Catholic Encyclopedia, New York, Encyclopedia Press, 1913.
- Sebastiano Pintus, Vescovi di Fausania, Civita, Ampurias, Ampurias e Civita, oggidì di Ampurias e Tempio, in Archivio storico sardo IV (1908), pp. 97–115
- Pius Bonifacius Gams, Series episcoporum Ecclesiae Catholicae, Leipzig 1931, pp. 832–833
- Konrad Eubel, Hierarchia Catholica Medii Aevi, vol. 1, p. 86; vol. 2, pp. 86–87; vol. 3, p. 107; vol. 4, p. 81; vol. 5, p. 82; vol. 6, p. 80
- Papal Bulla 'Romanus Pontifex', in Michele Antonio Gazano, La storia della Sardegna, Cagliari 1777, vol. II, pp. 160–162
- Decreto Instantibus votis, AAS 79 (1987), pp. 636–639
- M. Maxia, La diocesi di Ampurias. Studio storico-onomastico sull’insediamento umano medievale, Sassari 1997;
- A. M. Oliva, La diocesi di Civita all’epoca dei re Cattolici, in Da Olbìa ad Olbia, Atti del convegno internazionale di Studi, Olbia, 12-14 maggio 1994, editor G. Meloni-P. F. Simbula, Sassari 1996, II, 277–290;
- M. G. Sanna, Osservazioni cronotattiche e storiche su alcuni documenti relativi all’espansione cassinese nella diocesi di Ampurias sino alla metà del XII secolo, in Castelsardo. 900 anni di Storia, editor A. Mattone- A. Soddu, Rome 2007, 215–234.
- Raimondo Turtas, La Riforma tridentina nelle diocesi di Ampurias e Civita: dalle relazioni «ad limina» dei vescovi Giovanni Sanna, Filippo de Marymon e Giacomo Passamar (1586-1622), in Studi in onore di Pietro Meloni, Sassari 1988, pp. 233–259
- R. Turtas, Storia della Chiesa in Sardegna. Dalle origini al Duemila, Rome 1999;
- R. Turtas, Erezione, traslazione e unione di diocesi in Sardegna durante il regno di Ferdinando II d’Aragona (1479-1516), in Vescovi e diocesi in Italia dal XIV alla metà del XVI secolo, Atti del convegno di Storia della Chiesa, Brescia 21–25 September 1987, II, Rome 1990, 717-755
