= Tempio Pausania =

Tempio Pausania Tèmpiu (Sardinian) Tèmpiu (Gallurese)
- Comune
- Città di Tempio Pausania
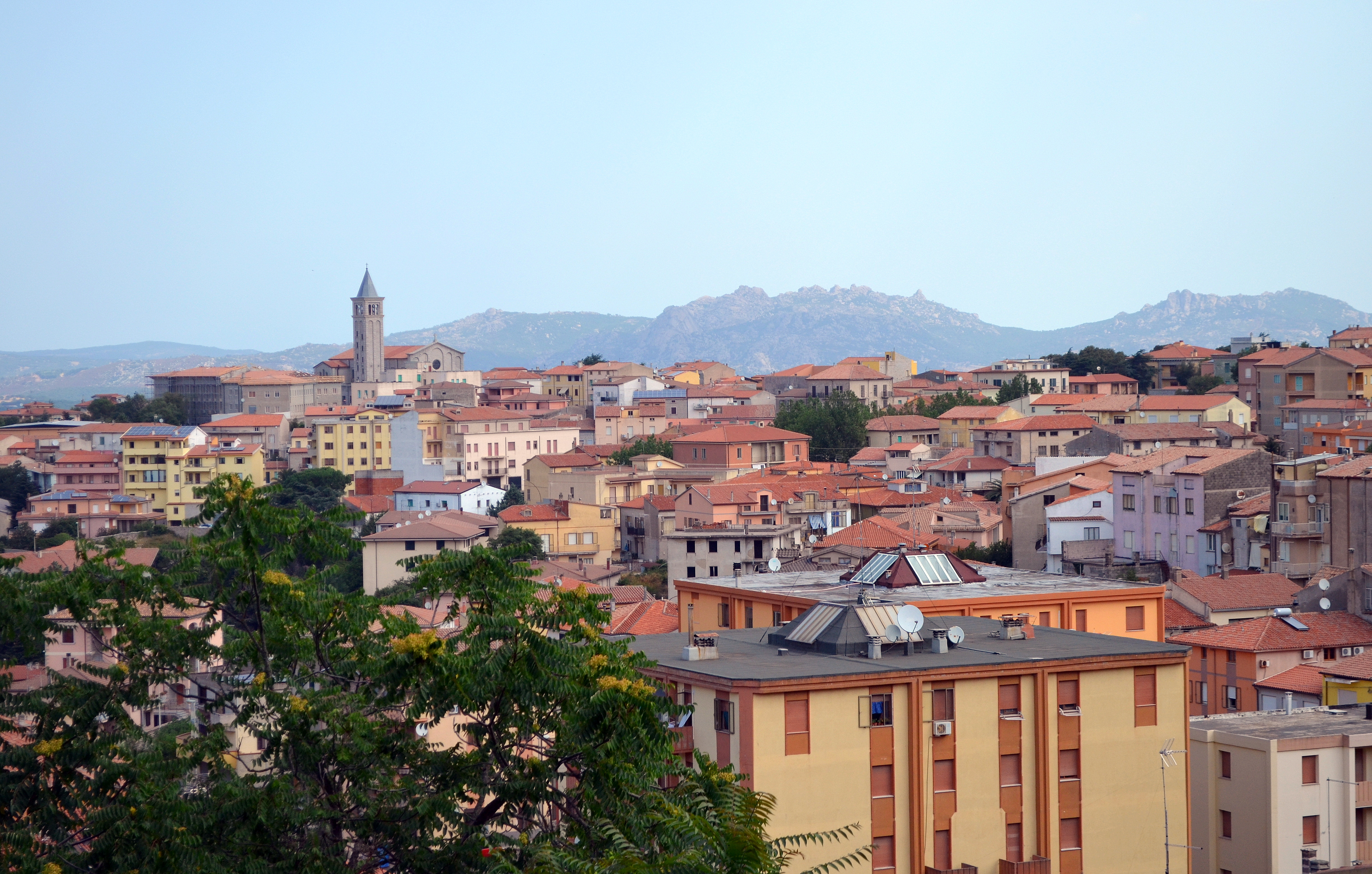
- View of Tempio Pausania

- Coat of arms

- Location within Sardinia
- Coordinates: 40°54′N 09°06′E
- Country: Italy
- Region: Sardinia
- Province: Gallura North-East Sardinia
- Frazioni: Bassacutena, Nuchis, San Pasquale

Government
  - Mayor: Gianna Masu (Ind.)

Area
  - Total: 210.82 km^{2} (81.40 sq mi)
- Elevation: 566 m (1,857 ft)

Population (2026)
  - Total: 12,878
  - Density: 61.085/km^{2} (158.21/sq mi)
- Demonym: Tempiesi
- Time zone: UTC+1 (CET)
  - Summer (DST): UTC+2 (CEST)
- Postal code: 07029
- Dialing code: 079
- Patron saint: St. Paul of Thebes
- Saint day: August 30
- Website: Official website

Tempio Pausania (Italian pronunciation: [ˈtɛmpjo pauˈzaːnja]; Sardinian: Tèmpiu, Gallurese: Tèmpiu) is a town and comune (municipality), which, along with Olbia, is a co-capital of the province of Gallura North-East Sardinia in the autonomous island region of Sardinia in Italy. It is one of I Borghi più belli d'Italia ("The most beautiful villages of Italy"). It has 12,878 inhabitants.

== History ==
Cultural and delegated administrative centre of the Gallura sub-region, Tempio has an ancient history. Typical granite-stone architecture of the historical centre presents many similarities with southern Corsican towns.

From 2005 to 2016 it was the co-capital of the province of Olbia-Tempio together with Olbia, with which it is also now the co-capital of the province of Gallura North-East Sardinia.

== Climate ==
According to the Köppen climate classification, Tempio Pausania experiences a hot-summer Mediterranean climate (Csa).

Climate data for Tempio Pausania (1981–2010)
Month	Jan	Feb	Mar	Apr	May	Jun	Jul	Aug	Sep	Oct	Nov	Dec	Year
Mean daily maximum °C (°F)	9.0 (48.2)	9.7 (49.5)	12.6 (54.7)	15.6 (60.1)	21.2 (70.2)	25.9 (78.6)	30.0 (86.0)	29.7 (85.5)	24.6 (76.3)	20.1 (68.2)	13.7 (56.7)	10.1 (50.2)	18.5 (65.4)
Daily mean °C (°F)	6.2 (43.2)	6.5 (43.7)	8.9 (48.0)	11.3 (52.3)	16.2 (61.2)	20.3 (68.5)	24.0 (75.2)	24.0 (75.2)	19.7 (67.5)	16.0 (60.8)	10.6 (51.1)	7.4 (45.3)	14.3 (57.7)
Mean daily minimum °C (°F)	3.4 (38.1)	3.3 (37.9)	5.1 (41.2)	6.9 (44.4)	11.1 (52.0)	14.6 (58.3)	18.0 (64.4)	18.2 (64.8)	14.7 (58.5)	11.8 (53.2)	7.4 (45.3)	4.7 (40.5)	9.9 (49.9)
Average precipitation mm (inches)	96.5 (3.80)	74.3 (2.93)	77.1 (3.04)	83.6 (3.29)	61.0 (2.40)	27.7 (1.09)	9.6 (0.38)	26.1 (1.03)	62.2 (2.45)	88.7 (3.49)	135.2 (5.32)	140.0 (5.51)	882 (34.73)
Source: Sistema nazionale protezione ambiente

== Demographics ==
As of 2026, the population is 12,878, of which 49.8% are male, and 50.2% are female. Minors make up 11.2% of the population, and seniors make up 27.8%.

Historical population

Year	Pop.	±%
1861	4,791	—
1871	4,885	+2.0%
1881	5,573	+14.1%
1901	6,748	+21.1%
1911	6,826	+1.2%
1921	7,304	+7.0%
1931	8,357	+14.4%
1936	8,886	+6.3%

Year	Pop.	±%
1951	9,882	+11.2%
1961	11,240	+13.7%
1971	11,779	+4.8%
1981	13,426	+14.0%
1991	13,899	+3.5%
2001	13,992	+0.7%
2011	13,946	−0.3%
2021	13,329	−4.4%

Source: ISTAT

=== Immigration ===
As of 2025, immigrants make up 4.9% of the total population. The 5 largest foreign countries of birth are Romania, Argentina, France, Morocco, and Germany.

== Main sights ==
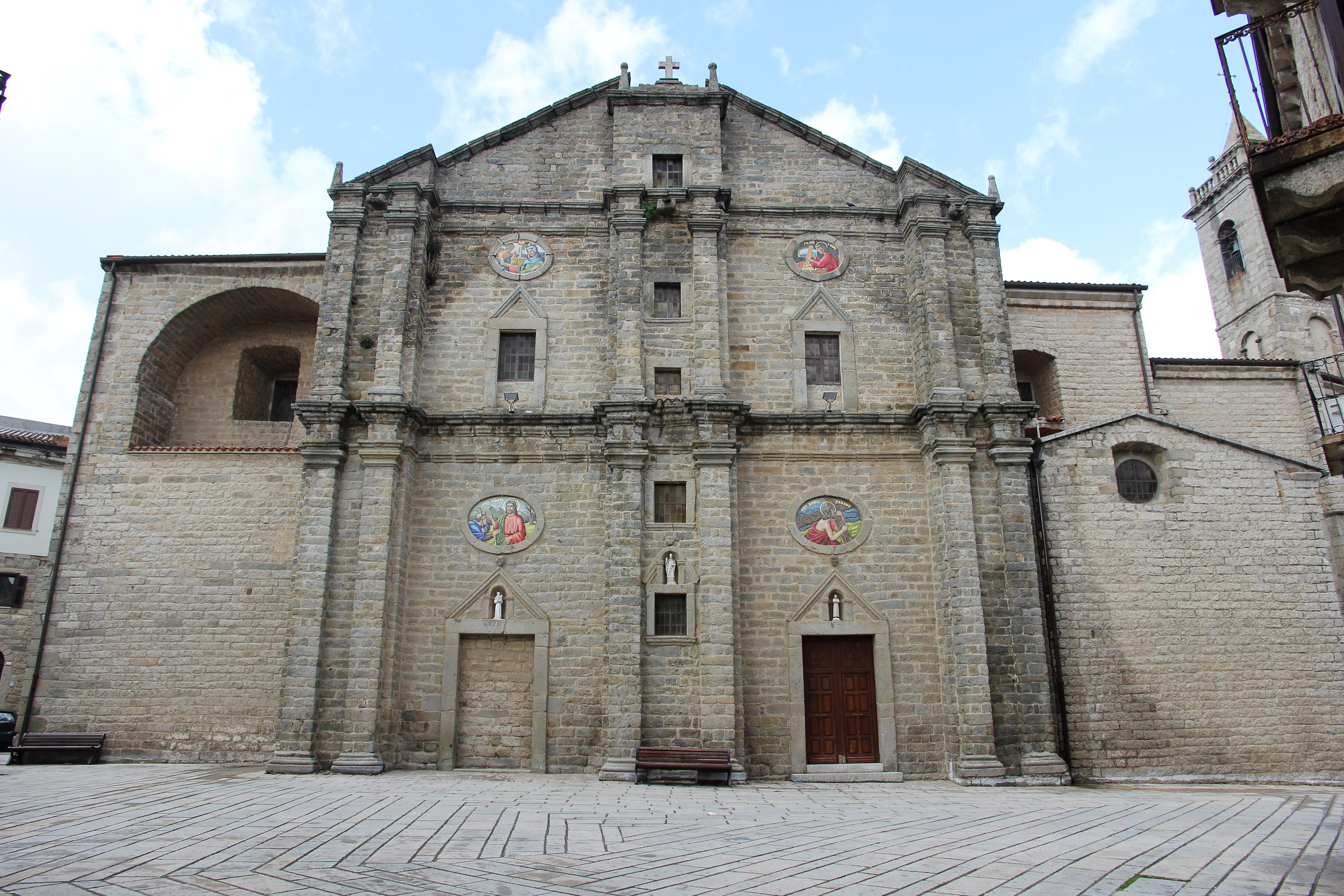
Cathedral

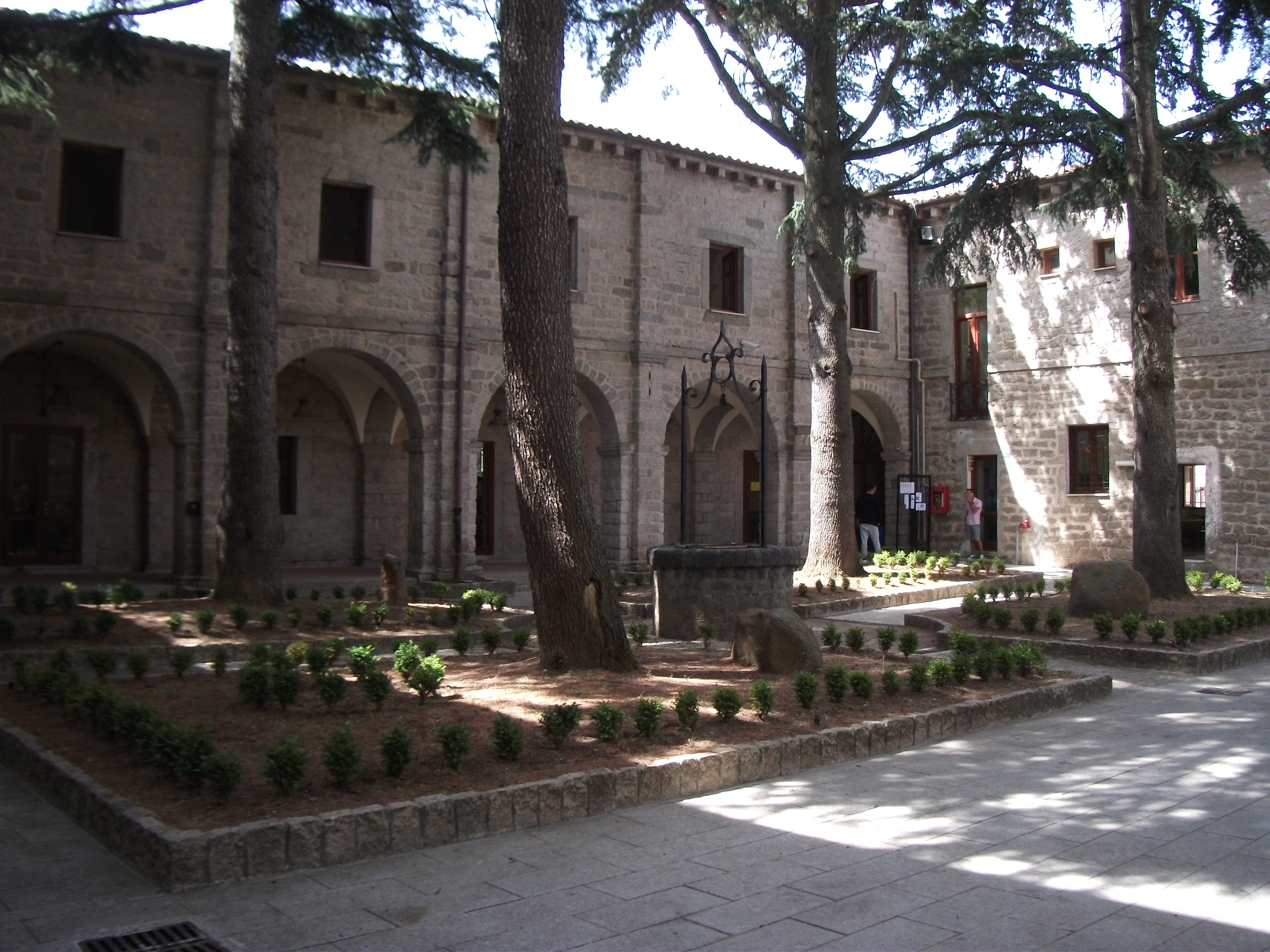
Cloister of the Scolopi

- Historical centre of the town, built in grey granite blocks (mainly 18th century); particularly Corso Matteotti, via Roma (Carrera Longa, Lu Runzatu, Lu Pultali), Piazza d'Italia (Piazza di l'Ara), Parco delle Rimembranze, Fonte Nuova (Funtana Noa) and Parco di San Lorenzo, via Mannu (ex via dei Nobili or dei Cavalieri)
- Nuraghe Maiori (Naracu Maiori)
- Nuraghe Polcu (Naracu Polcu)
- Ruins of Palace of Giudice Nino Visconti di Gallura (1200)
- San Pietro (Santu Petru) Cathedral;
- Santa Croce Church;
- Oratorio del Rosario (13th–14th century);
- Palazzo Villamarina-Pes (17th century);
- Palazzo degli Scolopi, (17th century), actually Provincial offices;
- Purgatorio (Lu Pulgatoriu) Church (17th century)
- Fonti di Rinagghju
- Monte Limbara, elevation 1,359 metres (4,459 ft), 16 kilometres (10 mi) south of the town.

== Transport ==
Tempio Pausania has national roads with Sassari (SS 672), Olbia (SS127) and Palau (SS133). There is a railway station on the narrow gauge Sassari to Palau line, with occasional tourist train services run by Trenino Verde.

== See also ==
- Diocese of Ampurias
- Francesco Menzio

== Sources ==
- Chisholm, Hugh, ed. (1911). "Tempio Pausania" . Encyclopædia Britannica. Vol. 26 (11th ed.). Cambridge University Press. p. 591.
