= List of Italian divisions in World War II =

This is a list of the World War II divisions of the Royal Italian Army of the Kingdom of Italy.

== Alpine Divisions ==
- 1st Alpine Division "Taurinense" (Turin)
- 2nd Alpine Division "Tridentina" (Trento)
- 3rd Alpine Division "Julia" (Julian March)
- 4th Alpine Division "Cuneense" (Cuneo)
- 5th Alpine Division "Pusteria" (Puster)
- 6th Alpine Division "Alpi Graie" (Graian Alps)

== Armored Divisions ==
- 131st Armored Division "Centauro" (Centaur)
- 132nd Armored Division "Ariete" (Ram)
- 133rd Armored Division "Littorio" (Lictor)
- 134th Armored Division "Freccia" (Arrow)
- 135th Armored Cavalry Division "Ariete" (Ram)
- 136th Armored Legionary Division "Centauro" (Centaur)
- 136th Armored Division "Giovani Fascisti" (Fascist Youth)

== Blackshirt Divisions ==
- 1st CC.NN. Division "23 Marzo" (23rd March)
- 2nd CC.NN. Division "28 Ottobre" (28th October)
- 3rd CC.NN. Division "21 Aprile" (21st April)
- 4th CC.NN. Division "3 Gennaio" (3rd January)
- 1st CC.NN. Armored Division "M" (Mussolini)

== Cavalry Divisions ==
- 1st Cavalry Division "Eugenio di Savoia" (Eugene of Savoy)
- 2nd Cavalry Division "Emanuele Filiberto Testa di Ferro" (Emmanuel Philibert Ironhead)
- 3rd Cavalry Division "Principe Amedeo Duca d'Aosta" (Prince Amedeo, Duke of Aosta)

== Coastal Divisions ==
- 201st Coastal Division
- 202nd Coastal Division
- 203rd Coastal Division
- 204th Coastal Division
- 205th Coastal Division
- 206th Coastal Division
- 207th Coastal Division
- 208th Coastal Division
- 209th Coastal Division
- 210th Coastal Division
- 211th Coastal Division
- 212th Coastal Division
- 213th Coastal Division
- 214th Coastal Division
- 215th Coastal Division
- 216th Coastal Division
- 220th Coastal Division
- 221st Coastal Division
- 222nd Coastal Division
- 223rd Coastal Division
- 224th Coastal Division
- 225th Coastal Division
- 226th Coastal Division
- 227th Coastal Division
- 230th Coastal Division

== Colonial Divisions ==
=== Libyan ===
- 1st Libyan Division
- 2nd Libyan Division

=== Somalian ===
- 101st Colonial Somalian Division
- 102nd Colonial Somalian Division

== Infantry Divisions ==
=== Air-transportable ===
- 80th Infantry Division "La Spezia" (La Spezia)

=== Auto-transportable ===
- 9th Infantry Division "Pasubio" (Pasubio)
- 10th Infantry Division "Piave" / 10th Motorized Division "Piave" (Piave)
- 52nd Infantry Division "Torino" (Turin)
- 103rd Infantry Division "Piacenza" (Piacenza)
- 104th Infantry Division "Mantova" (Mantua)
- 105th Infantry Division "Rovigo" (Rovigo)

=== Auto-transportable North-African Type ===
- 17th Infantry Division "Pavia" (Pavia)
- 25th Infantry Division "Bologna" (Bologna)
- 27th Infantry Division "Brescia" (Brescia)
- 55th Infantry Division "Savona" (Savona)
- 60th Infantry Division "Sabratha" (Sabratha)
- 61st Infantry Division "Sirte" (Sirte)
- 62nd Infantry Division "Marmarica" (Marmarica)
- 63rd Infantry Division "Cirene" (Cyrene)
- 64th Infantry Division "Catanzaro" (Catanzaro)

=== Infantry ===
- 5th Infantry Division "Cosseria" (Cosseria)
- 6th Infantry Division "Cuneo" (Cuneo)
- 7th Infantry Division "Lupi di Toscana" (Wolves of Tuscany)
- 12th Infantry Division "Sassari" (Sassari)
- 13th Infantry Division "Re" (King's)
- 14th Infantry Division "Isonzo" (Isonzo)
- 15th Infantry Division "Bergamo" (Bergamo)
- 16th Infantry Division "Pistoia" / 16th Motorized Division "Pistoia" (Pistoia)
- 18th Infantry Division "Messina" (Messina)
- 20th Infantry Division "Friuli" (Friuli)
- 21st Infantry Division "Granatieri di Sardegna" (Grenadiers of Sardinia)
- 22nd Infantry Division "Cacciatori delle Alpi" (Hunters of the Alps)
- 24th Infantry Division "Pinerolo" (Pinerolo)
- 28th Infantry Division "Aosta" (Aosta)
- 29th Infantry Division "Piemonte" (Piedmont)
- 30th Infantry Division "Sabauda" (Savoy)
- 31st Infantry Division "Calabria" (Calabria)
- 40th Infantry Division "Cacciatori d'Africa" (Hunters of Africa)
- 41st Infantry Division "Firenze" (Florence)
- 44th Infantry Division "Cremona" (Cremona)
- 47th Infantry Division "Bari" (Bari)
- 48th Infantry Division "Taro" (Taro)
- 49th Infantry Division "Parma" (Parma)
- 50th Infantry Division "Regina" (Queen's)
- 51st Infantry Division "Siena" (Siena)
- 54th Infantry Division "Napoli" (Naples)
- 56th Infantry Division "Casale" (Casale)
- 57th Infantry Division "Lombardia" (Lombardy)
- 58th Infantry Division "Legnano" (Legnano)
- 65th Infantry Division "Granatieri di Savoia" (Grenadiers of Savoy)

=== Mountain ===
- 1st Infantry Division "Superga" (Superga)
- 2nd Infantry Division "Sforzesca" (Sforzesca)
- 3rd Infantry Division "Ravenna" (Ravenna)
- 4th Infantry Division "Livorno" (Livorno)
- 11th Infantry Division "Brennero" (Brenner)
- 19th Infantry Division "Venezia" (Venice)
- 23rd Infantry Division "Ferrara" (Ferrara)
- 26th Infantry Division "Assietta" (Assietta)
- 32nd Infantry Division "Marche" (Marche)
- 33rd Infantry Division "Acqui" (Acqui)
- 36th Infantry Division "Forlì" (Forlì)
- 37th Infantry Division "Modena" (Modena)
- 38th Infantry Division "Puglie" (Puglia)
- 53rd Infantry Division "Arezzo" (Arezzo)
- 59th Infantry Division "Cagliari" (Cagliari)

=== Occupation ===
- 151st Infantry Division "Perugia" (Perugia)
- 152nd Infantry Division "Piceno" (Piceno)
- 153rd Infantry Division "Macerata" (Macerata)
- 154th Infantry Division "Murge" (Murge)
- 155th Infantry Division "Emilia" (Emilia)
- 156th Infantry Division "Vicenza" (Vicenza)
- 157th Infantry Division "Novara" (Novara)
- 158th Infantry Division "Zara" (Zara)
- 159th Infantry Division "Veneto" (Veneto)

=== Marching ===
- 8th Marching Division

== Motorized Divisions ==
- 10th Motorized Division "Piave" (former 10th Infantry Division "Piave") (Piave)
- 16th Motorized Division "Pistoia" (former 16th Infantry Division "Pistoia") (Pistoia)
- 101st Motorized Division "Trieste" (Trieste)
- 102nd Motorized Division "Trento" (Trento)

== Paratrooper Divisions ==
- 183rd Infantry Division "Ciclone" (Cyclone)
- 184th Infantry Division "Nembo" (Nimbus)
- 185th Infantry Division "Folgore" (Lightning)

== See also ==
- Italian Co-belligerent Army
- Royal Italian Army during World War II
