= Viddalba =

Viddalba Vidda 'ecchja (Gallurese)
- Comune
- Comune di Viddalba
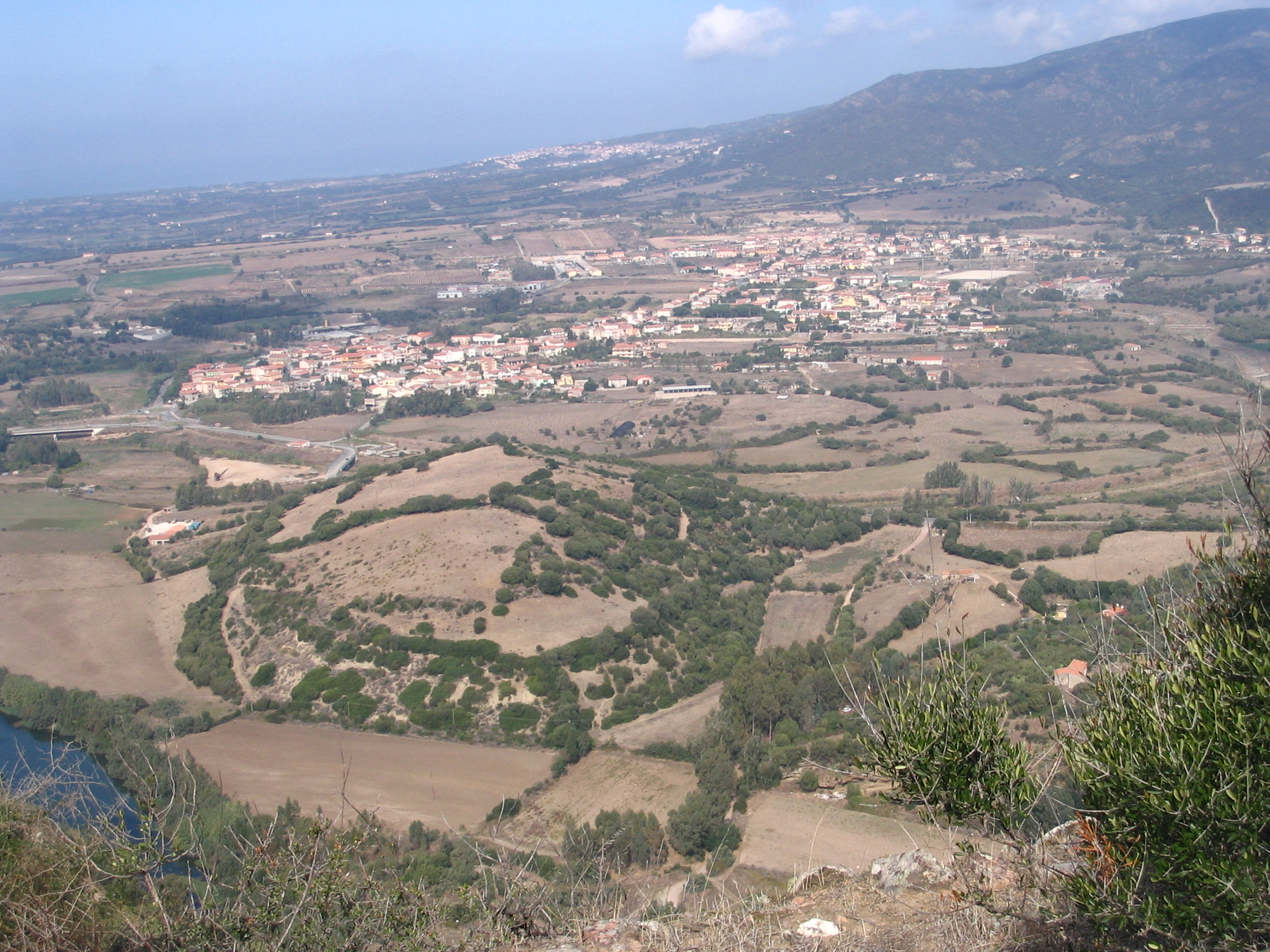

- Location within Sardinia
- Coordinates: 40°55′N 8°54′E
- Country: Italy
- Region: Sardinia
- Metropolitan city: Sassari (SS)

Government
  - Mayor: Federico Soggia

Area
  - Total: 48.8 km^{2} (18.8 sq mi)
- Elevation: 22 m (72 ft)

Population (30 November 2014)
  - Total: 1,724
  - Density: 35.3/km^{2} (91.5/sq mi)
- Demonym: Viddalbesi
- Time zone: UTC+1 (CET)
  - Summer (DST): UTC+2 (CEST)
- Postal code: 07030
- Dialing code: 079
- Website: Official website

Viddalba (Gallurese: Vidda 'ecchja; Logudorese: Viddalba) is a comune (municipality) in the Metropolitan City of Sassari in the Italian region of Sardinia, located about 190 kilometres (120 mi) north of Cagliari and about 35 kilometres (22 mi) northeast of Sassari.

Viddalba borders the following municipalities: Aggius, Badesi, Bortigiadas, Santa Maria Coghinas, Trinità d'Agultu e Vignola, Valledoria.

Sights include several domus de janas and nuraghe, a Roman necropolis and remains of a bridge, and the medieval Romanesque church of San Giovanni Evangelista.
