= Coghinas =

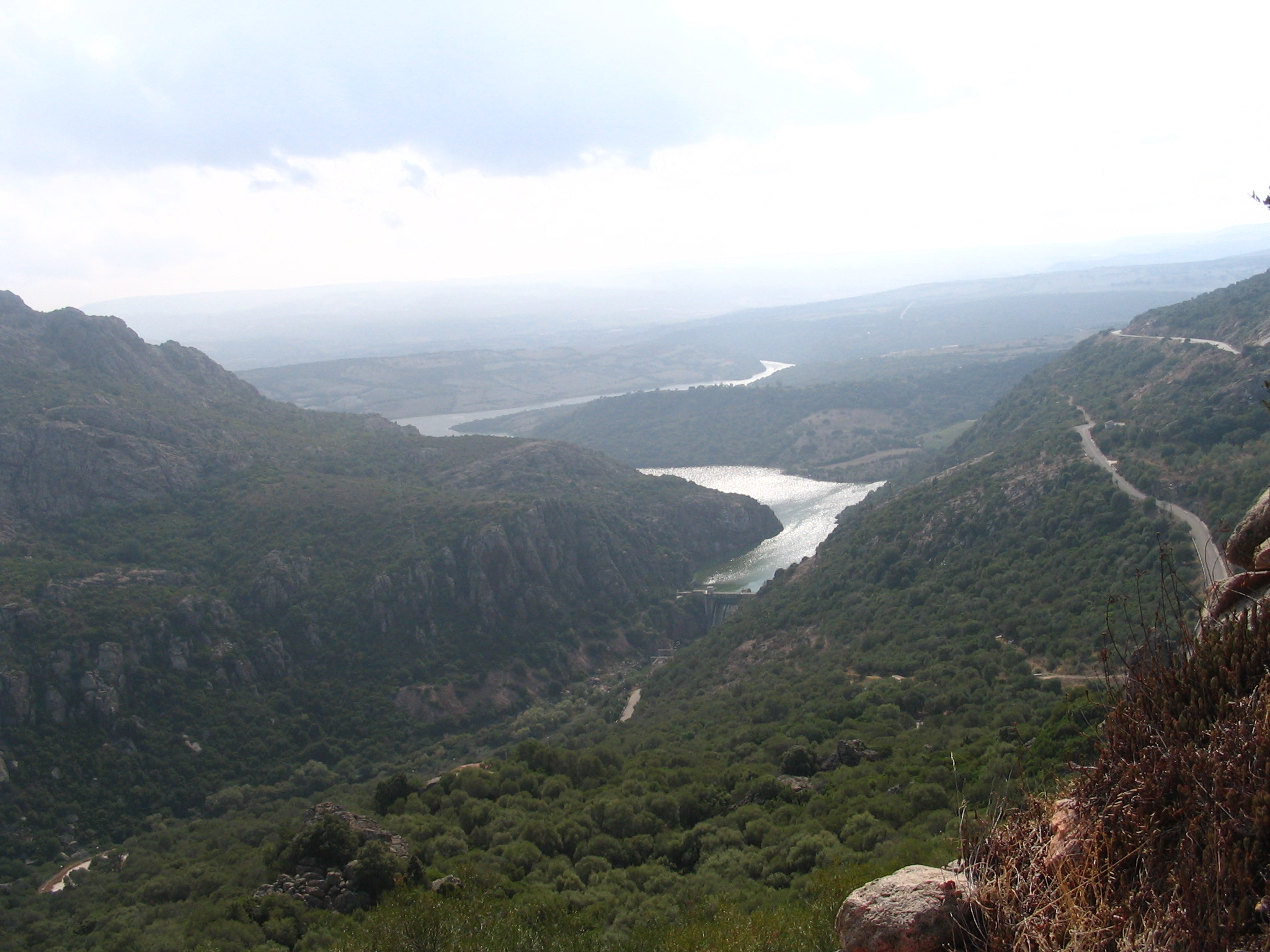

Location
- Country: Italy

Physical characteristics
- Source
  - location: Monti di Alà (Alà dei Sardi)
- Mouth: Gulf of Asinara (Mediterranean Sea)
  - location: near Badesi and Valledoria
  - coordinates: 40.9335°N 8.8068°E
  - elevation: 0 m (0 ft)
- Length: 115 km (71 mi)

The Coghinas is a river of northern Sardinia, Italy. With a length of 115 kilometres (71 mi), it is the third longest river of the island behind the Tirso and the Flumendosa.

It has a drainage basin of 2,551 square kilometres (985 sq mi).

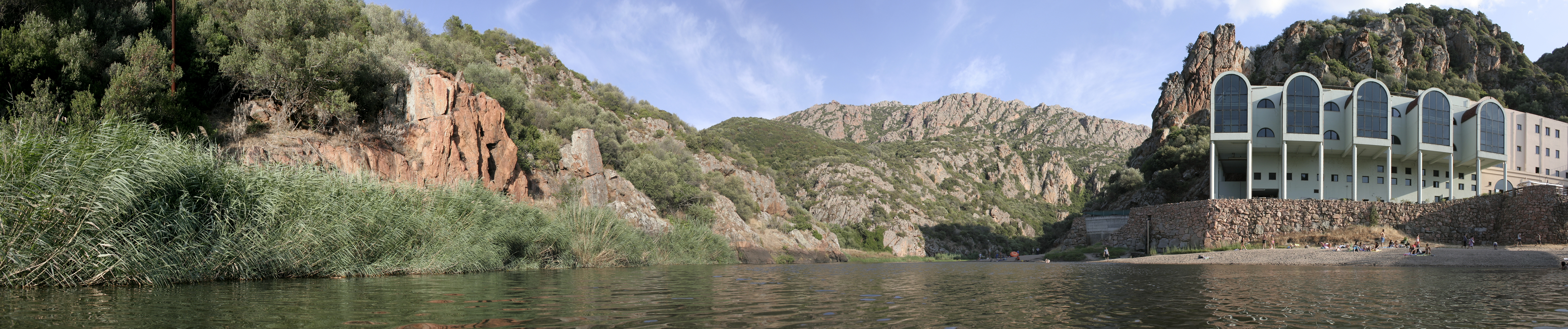
Thermal baths in the River Coghinas

The Coghinas's springs are located on the Mountains of Alà, in the province Olbia-Tempio; after crossing the Anglona traditional region in its later course, it flows into the Gulf of Asinara in the area of the towns of Badesi and Valledoria.

In order to capture excess water for use when needed, and for flood control and electricity generation, two dams have been built, which have created the Lake Coghinas and the Lake of Casteldoria.

== See also ==
- Lake Coghinas
