= Ottavio Bollea =

Italian general (1885–1954)

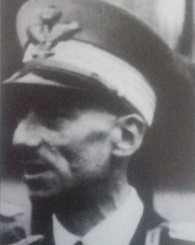
- Born: 25 August 1885; Moncalieri, Kingdom of Italy
- Died: 21 August 1954 (aged 68); Turin, Italy
- Military career
- Allegiance: Kingdom of Italy
- Branch: Royal Italian Army
- Service years: 1903–1941
- Rank: Major General
- Commands: 4th Motorized Field Anti-Aircraft Artillery Regiment; 7th Infantry Division "Lupi di Toscana"
- Conflicts: World War I; World War II; Battle of the Western Alps; Greco-Italian War

Ottavio Bollea (Moncalieri, 25 August 1885 – Turin, 21 August 1954) was an Italian general during World War II.

== Biography ==
After attending the military academy of Turin in 1903-1905 he graduated as artillery second lieutenant, later participating in the Great War with the ranks of lieutenant and later captain. In 1917 he became a staff officer, being promoted to major and later lieutenant colonel by 1918. He was a member the Military Inter-Allied Commission of Control for the Republic of Austria in 1920-1921. Upon his return to Italy he was transferred to the Ministry of War until June 1926, when he was assigned to the Central Artillery School.

As Colonel he was commander of the 4th Motorized Field Anti-Aircraft Artillery Regiment between 1930 and 1933, and in 1934-1935 he was deputy commander of the Army War School. From 1937, after promotion to Brigadier General, he was first commander of the artillery of the Army Corps of Naples then chief of staff of the 4th Army from 1 October 1938 to 15 July 1939 (being promoted to Major General on 17 August 1939); on that date he assumed command of the 7th Infantry Division "Lupi di Toscana" in Albania, until its repatriation in the following December.

After Italy's entry into the Second World War he and participated in operations on the Western Alpine front in command of the "Lupi di Toscana". He returned to Albania in December 1940 and commanded the Division during the operations against Greece, but in January 1941 his Division, hastily rushed to the front without adequate training and equipment, collapsed under Greek pressure and he was relieved of command and replaced by General Gustavo Reisoli on 10 February (amid the collapse of the division, Bollea was found by the Corps commander, General Camillo Mercalli, "in a state of nervous prostration… warming himself by a fire in a rear area Albania hamlet"). He was then placed on definitive leave by order of the General Ugo Cavallero, Chief of the General Staff and commander-in-chief on the Greek theatre (Cavallero stated that Bollea, who had been sick during the events that had let to the collapse of the Division, "could still be usefully employed commanding a major unit… after a suitable rest period", but he was never given a command again).
