= Carlo Petra di Caccuri =

WWII Italian general (1883–1967)

- Born: 21 January 1883; Naples, Kingdom of Italy
- Died: 1967 (aged 84)
- Military career
- Allegiance: Kingdom of Italy
- Branch: Royal Italian Army
- Rank: Major General
- Commands: Military District of Siena; 3rd Army Corps Artillery Regiment; 31st Infantry Division "Calabria"; Territorial Defense of Cagliari; 47th Infantry Division "Bari"; Military Command of Sardinia
- Conflicts: World War I; World War II

Carlo Petra di Caccuri (Naples, 21 January 1883 – 1967) was an Italian general during World War II.

== Biography ==
He was born into a family of the Neapolitan nobility, and held the titles of Duke of Caccuri, Marquis of Montorio and Baron of Gambatesa, Macchia and Venafro. After completing classical studies in his hometown, he followed the courses of the Royal Military Academy of Turin from 1900 to 1905, graduating as artillery second lieutenant in the Artillery. He was promoted to captain in 1914 and fought in the First World War, being promoted to major in 1917. He was promoted to lieutenant colonel in 1926 and to colonel in 1932, commanding the Military District of Siena and later of the 3rd Army Corps Artillery Regiment of Trieste.

After promotion to brigadier general in 1938, he commanded the artillery of the XIII Army Corps (Cagliari) and then the 31st Infantry Division "Calabria" in Sassari from 1939 to 1940. After promotion to major general, after a short period at the disposal of the Army Corps of Rome for special assignments, he returned in 1941 to Sardinia, in command of the Territorial Defense of Cagliari, remaining there until 1944 and witnessing the destruction of the city by Allied air raids in 1943, the armistice of Cassibile and the arrival of the Allies in Sardinia. In late 1943-1944 he commanded the 47th Infantry Division Bari, also stationed in Sardinia, and in 1944 he provisionally held the military command of Sardinia.

He died in 1967.
