= 220th Division =

220th Division may refer to:

- 220th Coastal Division, Italy
- 220th Rifle Division, Soviet Union, briefly the 220th Motorized Division

== See also ==
- List of military divisions by number
