= Antonio Basso =

Italian general

- Born: 27 June 1881; Naples, Kingdom of Italy
- Died: 2 October 1958 (aged 77); Rome, Italy
- Military career
- Allegiance: Kingdom of Italy
- Branch: Royal Italian Army
- Service years: 1900–1946
- Rank: General
- Commands: XXX Bombardier Group; 2nd Field Artillery Regiment; XIII Army Corps; Armed Forces of Sardinia; Campania Military Region
- Conflicts: World War I; World War II
- Awards: Bronze Medal of Military Valour (twice)

Antonio Basso (Naples, 27 June 1881 – Rome, 2 October 1958) was an Italian general during World War II.

== Biography ==
=== Early life and career ===
Basso attended the military college of Naples from 1892 to 1897 and then the Military Academy of Modena, graduating as second lieutenant in 1900.

From 1902 to 1911 he served as lieutenant in the 5th Fortress Artillery Brigade, then in the 3rd Fortress Artillery Regiment and finally in the 10th Campaign Artillery Regiment of Caserta. In 1912 he became captain in the 24th Field Artillery Regiment. He fought in the First World War as battery commander, as adjutant to the commander 24th Field Artillery Regiment and then as commander of the XXX Bombardier Group, where he obtained two Bronze Medals for Military Valor and was promoted to major for war merit. He ended the war as lieutenant colonel in command of a mountain artillery group.

Basso then became office head at the artillery command of Naples in 1919, and from 1919 to 1926 he served as Head of office at the Palermo Artillery Command (XII Army Corps) and group commander at the 22nd Field Artillery Regiment. From 1927 to 1931 he commanded the 2nd Field Artillery Regiment in Pesaro and from 1932 to 1935 the artillery of the 2nd Army Corps of Alessandria.

In June 1935, Basso became brigadier general and in 1936 he was appointed commander of the Royal School of Application of the Artillery and Engineers Branches, until 1938. In April 1938 he was promoted to major general and assigned to the Ministry of War, as general director of artillery, until 1940.

=== World War II ===
From 6 November 1940, having been promoted to lieutenant general, he was appointed commander of the XIII Army Corps in Sardinia, with headquarters in Cagliari, where he worked to improve coastal defenses.

In May 1943 he was promoted to full general and appointed civil commissioner for Sardinia as well as commander-in-chief of all troops in the island, numbering 130,000 men divided between the XIII Corps of General Gustavo Reisoli in southern Sardinia, with headquarters in Nuraminis, and the XXX Corps of General Gian Giacomo Castagna in northern Sardinia, with headquarters in Sassari. Altogether, he had at his disposal three infantry divisions, one paratrooper division, three coastal divisions, three coastal brigades, one motorized armoured group, one MILMART legion and one autonomous regiment. The Navy (Admiral Bruno Brivonesi) and Air Force (General Umberto Cappa) units in Sardinia were also subordinated to him. Basso's headquarters, Armed Forces Command Sardinia, were located in Bortigali.

When the Armistice of Cassibile was announced, on 8 September 1943, 23,000 German troops under General Fridolin von Senger und Etterlin were also present in Sardinia. Despite having received explicit orders from Comando Supremo to attack and destroy all German troops present in the island, Basso negotiated with General Carl Hans Lungershausen, commander of the 90th Panzergrenadier Division, their peaceful evacuation towards Corsica, which was accomplished by 18 September with only minor clashes near Oristano and La Maddalena.

In Turin, where Basso's family lived, his two daughters were imprisoned by the Germans at the end of 1943, while his son-in-law was deported to Germany. From 1 November 1943 Basso was transferred by the Italian Co-belligerent Army to Naples, as commander of the Campania Military Region, but in October 1944 he was dismissed and arrested under charges of failure to execute orders, due to his behavior in Sardinia in September 1943. In June 1946, after the war ended, he was judged before the Territorial Military Court of Rome for the crime of failure to carry out an assignment (Article 100 of the Military Criminal Code of War) "... for not having carried out orders for operations, without justified reason". He was acquitted after nearly two years of imprisonment on the following 28 June.

=== Postwar ===
Basso was transferred to the reserve on 29 June 1946 and discharged on 27 June 1954. In 1947 he published a book about the events following the Armistice in Sardinia, L'armistizio del Settembre 1943 in Sardegna. He ran as a candidate for the Nationalist Movement for Social Democracy at the 1948 Italian general election in Cagliari, but was not elected.

He died in Rome in 1958.
