= Bortigiadas =

Bortigiadas Bortigiadas (Sardinian) Bultiggjata (Gallurese)
- Comune
- Comune di Bortigiadas
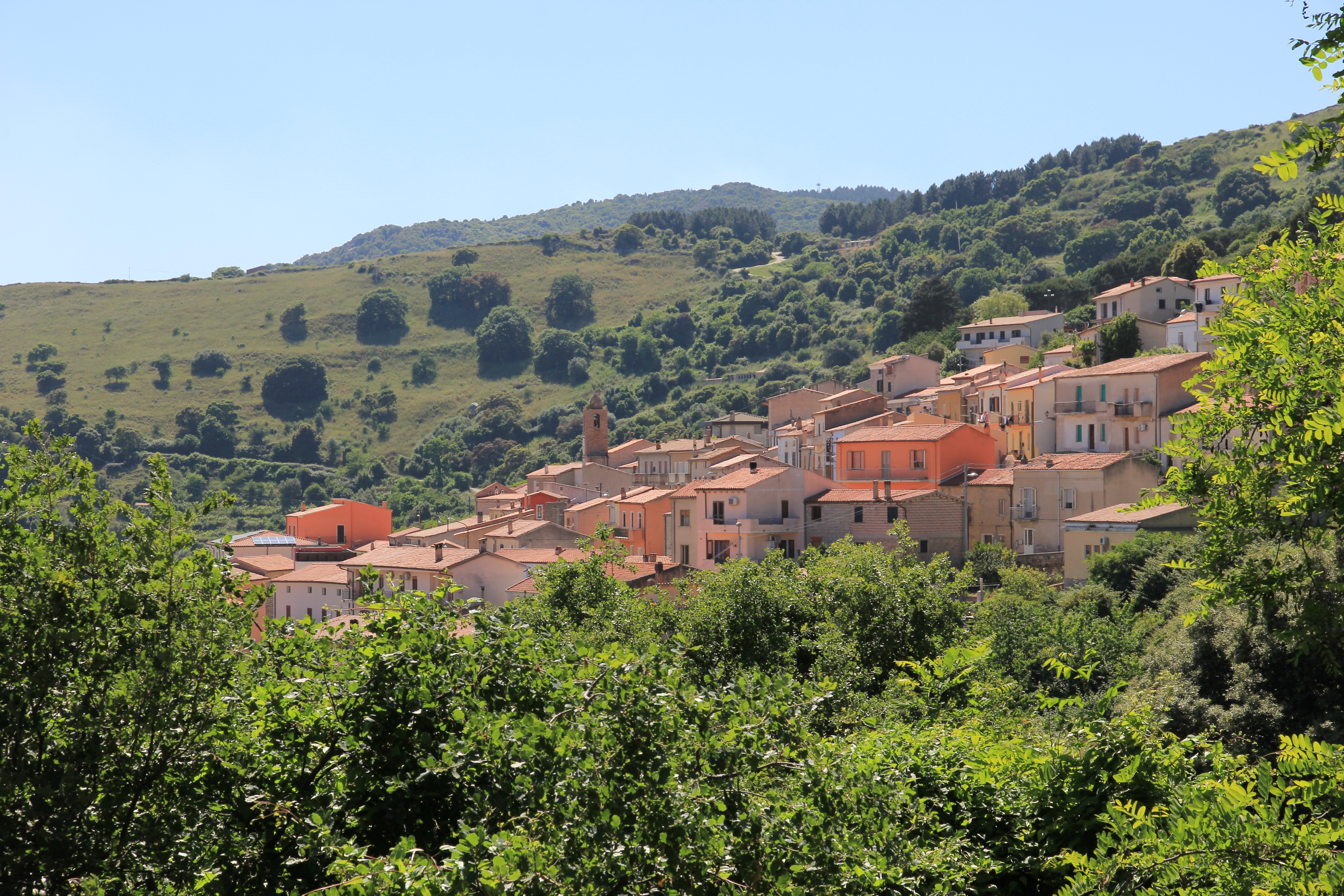
- View of Bortigiadas

- Location within Sardinia
- Coordinates: 40°54′N 9°3′E
- Country: Italy
- Region: Sardinia
- Province: Gallura North-East Sardinia
- Frazioni: Tisiennari, Scalaruja, Nibareddu, Littigheddi, Lu Falzu, Figaruia, Li Paulis

Government
  - Mayor: Emiliano Deiana

Area
  - Total: 75.90 km^{2} (29.31 sq mi)
- Elevation: 476 m (1,562 ft)

Population (2026)
  - Total: 692
  - Density: 9.12/km^{2} (23.6/sq mi)
- Demonym: Bortigiadesi
- Time zone: UTC+1 (CET)
  - Summer (DST): UTC+2 (CEST)
- Postal code: 07030
- Dialing code: 079
- Website: Official website

Bortigiadas (Sardinian: Bortigiadas, Gallurese: Bultigghjata) is a village and comune (municipality) in the Province of Gallura North-East Sardinia in the autonomous island region of Sardinia in Italy, located about 190 kilometres (120 mi) north of Cagliari and about 40 kilometres (25 mi) west of Olbia. It has 692 inhabitants.

Bortigiadas borders the municipalities of Aggius, Perfugas, Santa Maria Coghinas, Tempio Pausania, and Viddalba.

== Demographics ==
As of 2026, the population is 692, of which 50.6% are male, and 49.4% are female. Minors make up 12.4% of the population, and seniors make up 33.5%.

Historical population

Year	Pop.	±%
1861	1,432	—
1871	865	−39.6%
1881	909	+5.1%
1901	1,030	+13.3%
1911	1,139	+10.6%
1921	1,091	−4.2%
1931	1,406	+28.9%
1936	1,487	+5.8%

Year	Pop.	±%
1951	1,615	+8.6%
1961	1,585	−1.9%
1971	1,276	−19.5%
1981	1,127	−11.7%
1991	987	−12.4%
2001	896	−9.2%
2011	800	−10.7%
2021	729	−8.9%

Source: ISTAT

=== Immigration ===
As of 2025, immigrants make up 7.4% of the total population. The 5 largest foreign countries of birth are Germany, Romania, Switzerland, Belgium, and Austria.
