= 205th Coastal Division =

Royal Italian Army infantry division during World War II

- Active: 1941 – 1945
- Country: Kingdom of Italy
- Branch: Royal Italian Army
- Size: Division
- Garrison/HQ: Carbonia
- Engagements: World War II

Insignia
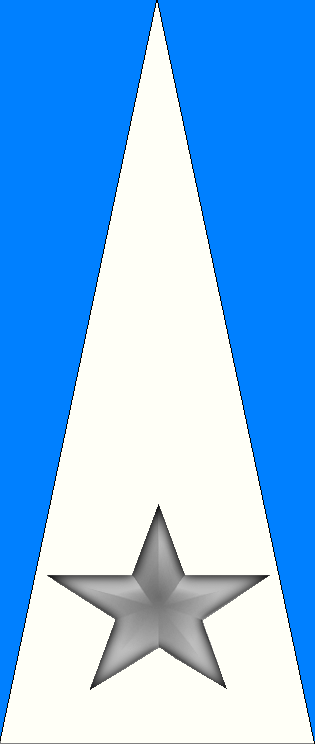
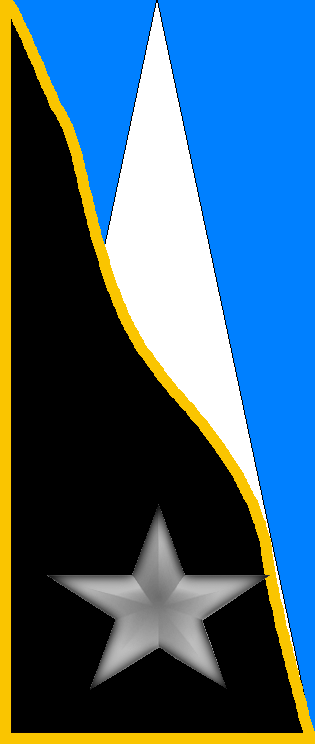
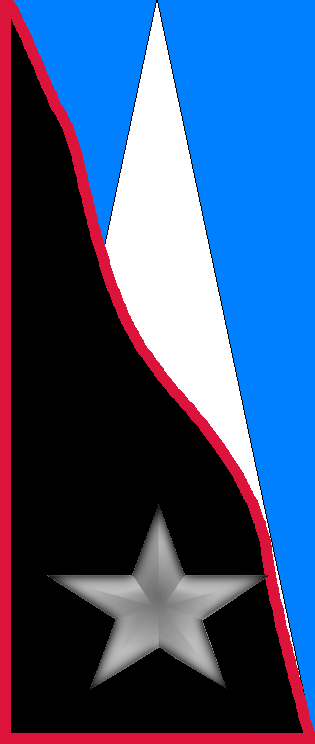
- Identification symbol: 205th Coastal Division gorget patches

The 205th Coastal Division (Italian: 205ª Divisione Costiera) was an infantry division of the Royal Italian Army during World War II. Royal Italian Army coastal divisions were second line divisions formed with reservists and equipped with second rate materiel. Recruited locally, they were often commanded by officers called out of retirement.

== History ==
Coastal units in Sardinia

=== Sardinia ===
The division was activated on 15 January 1942 in Iglesias by reorganizing the V Coastal Sector Command. The division was assigned to XIII Army Corps, which was responsible for the defense of the southern half of the island of Sardinia. The division was based in Carbonia and responsible for the coastal defense from Torre Foghe down the western coast of Sardinia to, but excluding Capo Pula. The division's area of responsibility included the Gulf of Oristano and the south-western coast of Sardinia with the islands of Sant'Antioco and San Pietro. On 1 August 1942 the XXXIII Coastal Brigade was activated and took over the responsibility for the defense of the coast from Torre Foghe down to approximately Punta Usai. The XXXIII Coastal Brigade's area of responsibility including the entire Gulf of Oristano.

The 205th Coastal Division, together with the 203rd Coastal Division, 204th Coastal Division, IV Coastal Brigade, and XXXIII Coastal Brigade formed a first static defense line against allied landings on the island. Further inland the 30th Infantry Division "Sabauda", 31st Infantry Division "Calabria", 47th Infantry Division "Bari", and 184th Infantry Division "Nembo" were the mobile forces of the Armed Forces Command Sardinia.

After the announcement of the Armistice of Cassibile on 8 September 1943 the division, together with all other divisions on Sardinia, refused German demands to surrender. Realizing the futility of attempting to gain control of Sardinia the German forces on the island retreated to Corsica.

=== US Army Air Force ===
The division joined the Italian Co-belligerent Army and was renamed 205th Division. In November 1944 the division was shipped to Naples and in December 1944 it was assigned to the US Army Air Force's American Air Forces in the Mediterranean to provide auxiliary services at American airfields in mainland Italy. The division consisted of about 5,000 men and fielded 48 aviation services companies and six transport companies. In August 1945 the division was reduced in size and in 1946 it was disbanded.

== Organization ==
- 205th Coastal Division, in Carbonia
  - 127th Coastal Regiment
    - CDII Coastal Battalion
    - CDVII Coastal Battalion
  - 128th Coastal Regiment
    - XCII Territorial Battalion
    - CDVI Coastal Battalion
    - CDXXXVIII Coastal Battalion
  - 129th Coastal Regiment
    - CCCXCVI Coastal Battalion
    - CDIV Coastal Battalion
    - CDV Coastal Battalion
    - CDXXII Coastal Battalion
    - CDXXXVI Coastal Battalion
  - 47th Coastal Artillery Regiment
    - XIV Coastal Artillery Group
    - XVII Coastal Artillery Group
    - XXVIII Coastal Artillery Group
    - LXXXIII Coastal Artillery Group
    - CCXVII Coastal Artillery Group
  - 48th Coastal Artillery Regiment
    - XVIII Coastal Artillery Group
    - XXIX Coastal Artillery Group
    - LXXXI Coastal Artillery Group
    - XCIII Coastal Artillery Group
    - CCXXIX Coastal Artillery Group
  - CIII Machine Gun Battalion
    - 163 Machine Gun Company
    - 165 Machine Gun Company
  - 205th Mixed Engineer Company
  - 205th Carabinieri Section
  - 217th Field Post Office
  - Division Services

Attached to the division:

- Tactical Sector Oristano, in Oristano (responsible for the defense of the Gulf of Oristano; became the XXXIII Coastal Brigade on 1 August 1942)
  - 132nd Coastal Regiment
    - CDIII Coastal Battalion
    - CDXXI Coastal Battalion
  - 925th Coastal Regiment
    - CMV Coastal Battalion
    - CMVI Coastal Battalion
    - CMVII Coastal Battalion

== Commanding officers ==
The division's commanding officer was:

- Generale di Divisione Giovanni Manildo (15 January 1942 - 1944)
