= Ernesto Cappa =

Italian military officer

- Born: 18 February 1888; Dogliani, Kingdom of Italy
- Died: 27 January 1957 (aged 68); Cuneo, Italy
- Military career
- Allegiance: Kingdom of Italy; Italy
- Branch: Royal Italian Army; Italian Army
- Service years: 1906–1952
- Rank: Lieutenant General
- Commands: 91st Infantry Regiment "Basilicata"; 7th Infantry Division "Lupi di Toscana"; Udine Territorial Defense Command; Padua Territorial Defense Command; Army Chief of Staff
- Conflicts: World War I; Battle of Asiago; White War; Battle of Caporetto; World War II; Italian occupation of France; Operation Achse
- Awards: Bronze Medal of Military Valor (twice); War Merit Cross; Military Order of Savoy; Order of Merit of the Italian Republic; Order of the Crown of Italy; Order of Saints Maurice and Lazarus; Legion of Honor

Ernesto Giulio Cappa (18 February 1888 – 27 January 1957) was an Italian general during World War II. After the war he served as Chief of Staff of the Italian Army from 1950 to 1952.

== Biography ==
Born in the province of Cuneo, after studying in Bra and Mondovì, from 1906 to 1908 he attended the Military Academy of Modena, graduating as second lieutenant and being assigned to the 32nd Infantry Regiment "Cuneo". He was later promoted to lieutenant and stationed in Naples, and from 12 January 1912 to 1913 he was Secretary of the War School of the Royal Italian Army. In the early stages of World War I he fought with the 162nd Regiment “Ivrea”, being promoted to captain on 30 June 1915 and being wounded in action and awarded a Bronze Medal of Military Valor for an action on the Asiago plateau on 20 May 1916. He was later transferred to the Carnic front, where on 25 October 1917 he was seriously wounded and frostbitten to both feet during the battle of Caporetto and captured by the Austro-Hungarians. He was later awarded another Bronze Medal for this action.

From 1920 to 1925 he was again secretary of the War School, now with the rank of major, and later attended the same school until 1928. From 1929 to 1931 he served as lieutenant colonel in Bolzano, commanding the 1st Battalion of the 232nd Infantry Regiment. From October 1931 to May 1933 he served in the General Staff in Rome as Head of the Mobilization Office, and from May 1933 to September 1937 he commander of the 91st Infantry Regiment "Basilicata", being promoted to colonel. From 1937 to 1940 he was Head of the Organization and Mobilization Office of the Army General Staff.

From July 1940 to April 1943, after promotion to Brigadier General, he was head of the 2nd Department of the Army General Staff. In 1942 he was promoted to Major General, and on 25 May 1943 he assumed command of the 7th Infantry Division "Lupi di Toscana", stationed in southern France. On 3 September 1943 the "Lupi di Toscana" Division began its transfer to Italy (west of Rome), which was scheduled to have been completed between the 15 and 20 September. In the morning of 8 September, the day the armistice of Cassibile was announced, General Cappa arrived in Rome and went to Monterotondo to receive orders from the Operations Department of the Army General Staff. There, the Head of Department advised him to wait in Rome for the Division to gather. Nevertheless, on the morning of September 9 Cappa went among the troops of the "Lupi" who had already arrived in the area and, in the total absence of orders from his superiors, he took the initiative to organize the defense in the Santa Severa–Cerveteri–Palo Laziale sectors against German troops that were moving to seize control of the capital. From 9 to 11 September he led the resistance against the Germans, which were unable to pass in his area; he repelled an attack of German paratroopers on his divisional headquarters, located in the castle of Palo, and dispersed a German motorized column. On 11 September, however, he was ordered to cease resistance as an agreement had been reached for a peaceful takeover of Rome. After complying with the orders, ensuring that his troops lay down their arms but without being imprisoned by the Germans, he returned to his native Piedmont, where he refused to join the Italian Social Republic and maintained close contacts with the National Liberation Committee.

After the war, in 1947 he held the territorial command of Udine and then that of Padua, presiding over the reorganization of Army forces in Veneto and along the new border with Yugoslavia; for his work he was granted honorary citizenship by Gorizia. In 1948 he was promoted to lieutenant general and made Secretary General of the Army until 1950, and from 1950 to 1952 he held the post of Chief of Staff of the Italian Army. Immediately after his retirement, he was appointed of Prefect of Milan, an office he held from 20 November 1952 to 25 October 1954. He died in Cuneo on 28 January 1957.
