= 204th Coastal Division =

Royal Italian Army infantry division during World War II

- Active: 1941 – 1944
- Country: Kingdom of Italy
- Branch: Royal Italian Army
- Size: Division
- Garrison/HQ: Porto Torres
- Engagements: World War II

Insignia
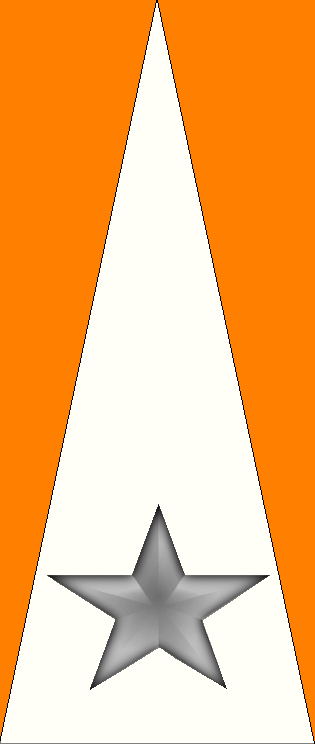
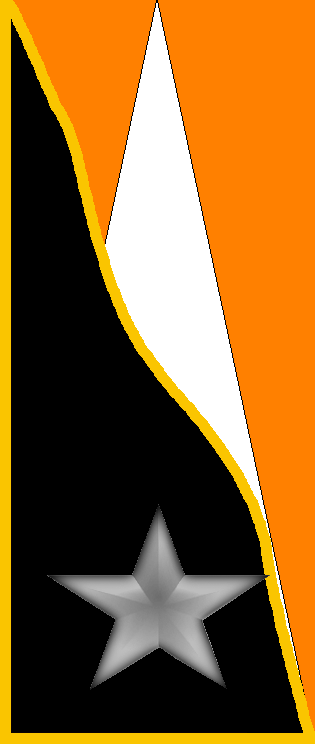
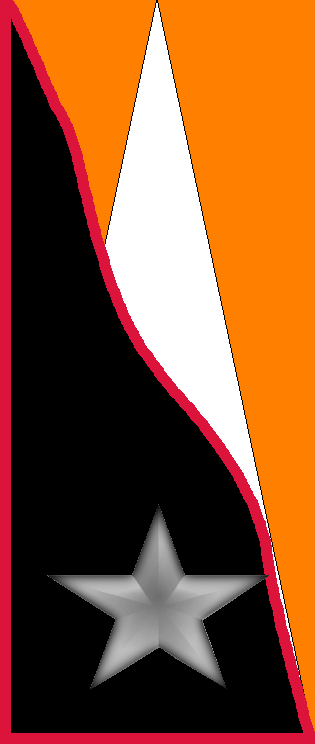
- Identification symbol: 204th Coastal Division gorget patches

The 204th Coastal Division (Italian: 204ª Divisione Costiera) was an infantry division of the Royal Italian Army during World War II. Royal Italian Army coastal divisions were second line divisions formed with reservists and equipped with second rate materiel. Recruited locally, they were often commanded by officers called out of retirement.

== History ==
Coastal units in Sardinia

The division was activated on 15 January 1942 in Sassari by reorganizing the IV Coastal Sector Command. The division was initially assigned to XIII Army Corps, which was responsible for the defense of the island of Sardinia. On 15 July 1943 the division was assigned to the reactivated XXX Army Corps, which took over the responsibility for the defense of the northern half of Sardinia. The division was based in Porto Torres and responsible for the coastal defense of the north-western and northern coast of Sardinia from, but excluding, Torre Foghe to Capo Coda Cavallo. The division's area of responsibility included the Gulf of Asinara and Gulf of Alghero, and the Maddalena archipelago with its large Royal Italian Navy base. On 1 August 1942 the IV Coastal Brigade was reactivated and took over the responsibility for the defense of the Maddalena archipelago and the north-eastern coast of Sardinia between Punta Li Francesi and Capo Coda Cavallo.

The 204th Coastal Division, together with the 203rd Coastal Division, 205th Coastal Division, IV Coastal Brigade and XXXIII Coastal Brigade formed a first static defense line against allied landings on the island. Further inland the 30th Infantry Division "Sabauda", 31st Infantry Division "Calabria", 47th Infantry Division "Bari", and 184th Infantry Division "Nembo" were the mobile forces of the Armed Forces Command Sardinia.

After the announcement of the Armistice of Cassibile on 8 September 1943 the division, together with all other divisions on Sardinia, refused German demands to surrender. Realizing the futility of attempting to gain control of Sardinia the German forces on the island retreated to Corsica.

The division joined the Italian Co-belligerent Army and was renamed 204th Division. In August 1944 the division's command was shipped to the mainland where it was used to reform other commands.

== Organization ==
- 204th Coastal Division, in Porto Torres
  - 130th Coastal Regiment
    - CCC Coastal Battalion
    - CCCXCVIII Coastal Battalion
    - CCCXCIX Coastal Battalion
    - CMIV Coastal Battalion
  - 149th Coastal Regiment
    - CCCXCIV Coastal Battalion
    - CCCXCVII Coastal Battalion
    - CDI Coastal Battalion
    - CDXCIX Coastal Battalion
  - 46th Coastal Artillery Regiment
    - XII Coastal Artillery Group
    - XIII Coastal Artillery Group
    - LXXXII Coastal Artillery Group
    - LXXXIV Coastal Artillery Group
    - CCXI Coastal Artillery Group
  - CII Machine Gun Battalion
    - 161st Machine Gun Company
    - 162nd Machine Gun Company
  - 204th Mixed Engineer Company
  - 204th Carabinieri Section
  - 215th Field Post Office
  - Division Services

== Commanding officers ==
The division's commanding officer was:

- Generale di Divisione Manlio Mora (15 January 1942 - 1944)
