= 203rd Coastal Division =

Royal Italian Army infantry division during World War II

- Active: 1943 – 1944
- Country: Kingdom of Italy
- Branch: Royal Italian Army
- Size: Division
- Garrison/HQ: San Vito, Sardinia
- Engagements: World War II

Insignia
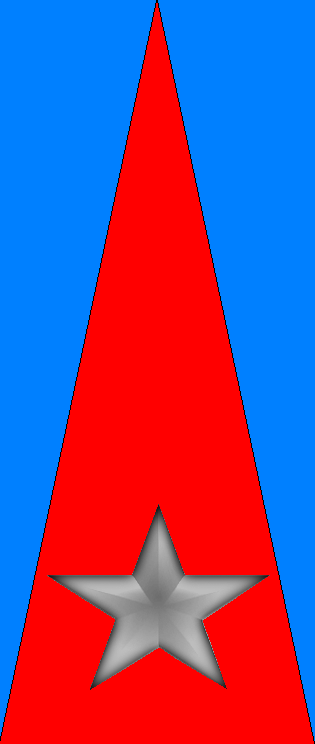
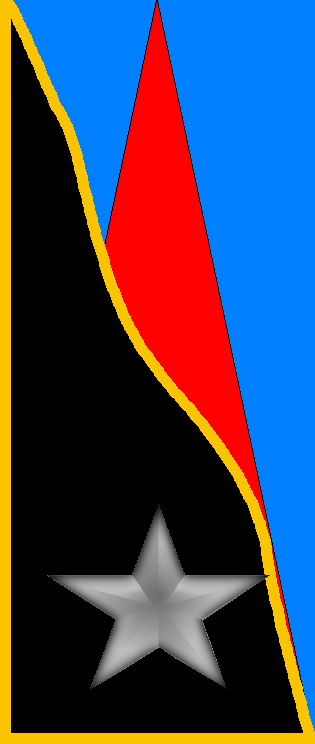
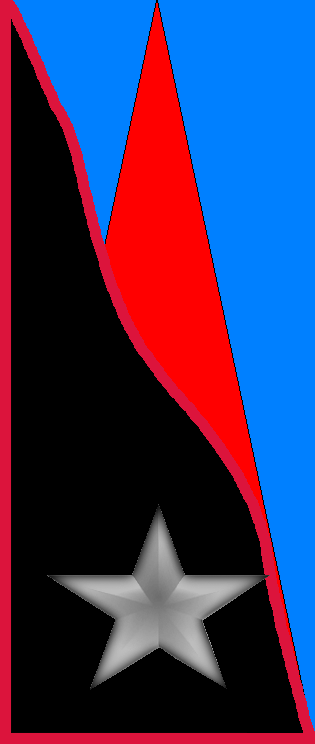
- Identification symbol: 203rd Coastal Division gorget patches

The 203rd Coastal Division (Italian: 203ª Divisione Costiera) was an infantry division of the Royal Italian Army during World War II. Royal Italian Army coastal divisions were second line divisions formed with reservists and equipped with second rate materiel. Recruited locally, they were often commanded by officers called out of retirement.

== History ==
Coastal units in Sardinia

The division was activated on 1 July 1943 in Cagliari by expanding the XIII Coastal Brigade. The division was assigned to XIII Army Corps, which was responsible for the defense of the southern half of the island of Sardinia. The division was based in San Vito and responsible for the coastal defense of the coast between Capo Pula and Capo Monte Santu, which included the Gulf of Cagliari, the harbor of Cagliari, and the south-eastern coast of Sardinia.

The 203rd Coastal Division, together with the 204th Coastal Division, 205th Coastal Division, IV Coastal Brigade, and XXXIII Coastal Brigade formed a first static defense line against allied landings on the island. Further inland the 30th Infantry Division "Sabauda", 31st Infantry Division "Calabria", 47th Infantry Division "Bari", and 184th Infantry Division "Nembo" were the mobile forces of the Armed Forces Command Sardinia.

After the announcement of the Armistice of Cassibile on 8 September 1943 the division, together with all other divisions on Sardinia, refused German demands to surrender. Realizing the futility of attempting to gain control of Sardinia the German forces on the island retreated to Corsica.

The division joined the Italian Co-belligerent Army and remained in Sardinia at reduced strength. On 29 August 1944 the division and most of its remaining units were disbanded.

== Organization ==
- 203rd Coastal Division, in San Vito
  - 126th Coastal Regiment
    - CDIX Coastal Battalion
    - CDXCI Coastal Battalion
    - CMIII Coastal Battalion
  - 174th Coastal Regiment
    - CCCXCV Coastal Battalion
    - CDXXII Coastal Battalion
    - CMII Coastal Battalion
  - 195th Coastal Regiment (formed on 20 August 1943)
    - CDX Coastal Battalion
    - CDLXXIII Coastal Battalion
    - DLII Coastal Battalion
  - 70th Coastal Artillery Regiment
    - LIX Coastal Artillery Group
    - CXLIV Coastal Artillery Group
  - 203rd Carabinieri Section
  - 219th Field Post Office
  - Division Services

Attached to the division:

- Harbor Defense Command Cagliari
  - 408th Mobile Territorial Infantry Regiment (reserve unit)
  - CDLXXVII Coastal Battalion
  - CCXXV Coastal Artillery Group

== Commanding officers ==
The division's commanding officer was:

- Generale di Divisione Adolfo Sardi (1 July 1943 - 1944)
