= Badesi =

Badesi Badèsi (Gallurese)
- Comune
- Comune di Badesi
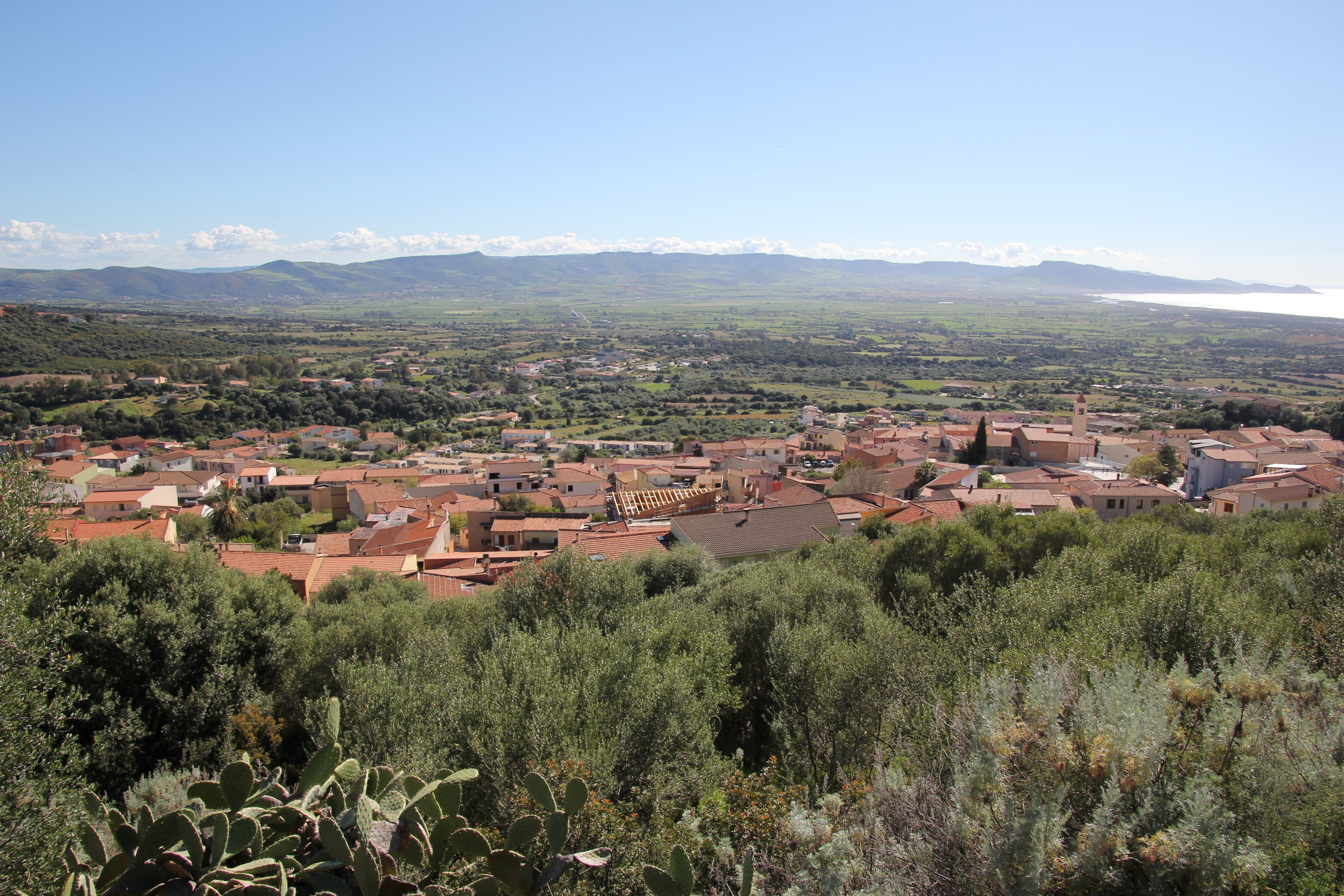
- View of Badesi

- Location within Sardinia
- Coordinates: 40°58′N 8°53′E
- Country: Italy
- Region: Sardinia
- Province: Gallura North-East Sardinia

Government
  - Mayor: Giovanni Maria Mamia

Area
  - Total: 31.30 km^{2} (12.08 sq mi)
- Elevation: 102 m (335 ft)

Population (2026)
  - Total: 1,812
  - Density: 57.89/km^{2} (149.9/sq mi)
- Demonym: Badesani
- Time zone: UTC+1 (CET)
  - Summer (DST): UTC+2 (CEST)
- Postal code: 07030
- Dialing code: 079

Badesi (Gallurese: Badèsi) is a town and comune (municipality) in the Province of Gallura North-East Sardinia in the autonomous island region of Sardinia in Italy, located about 200 kilometres (120 mi) north of Cagliari and about 50 kilometres (31 mi) west of Olbia. It has 1,812 inhabitants.

Badesi borders the municipalities of Trinità d'Agultu e Vignola, Valledoria, and Viddalba.

== Demographics ==
As of 2026, the population is 1,812, of which 49.6% are male, and 50.4% are female. Minors make up 12.7% of the population, and seniors make up 28.0%.

Historical population

Year	Pop.	±%
1861	432	—
1871	430	−0.5%
1881	458	+6.5%
1901	593	+29.5%
1911	774	+30.5%
1921	896	+15.8%
1931	1,026	+14.5%
1936	1,110	+8.2%

Year	Pop.	±%
1951	1,356	+22.2%
1961	1,555	+14.7%
1971	1,563	+0.5%
1981	1,759	+12.5%
1991	1,860	+5.7%
2001	1,862	+0.1%
2011	1,898	+1.9%
2021	1,838	−3.2%

Source: ISTAT

=== Immigration ===
As of 2025, immigrants make up 6.6% of the total population. The 5 largest foreign countries of birth are Romania, Russia, Ukraine, France, and Hungary.
