= Arduino Garelli =

Italian general

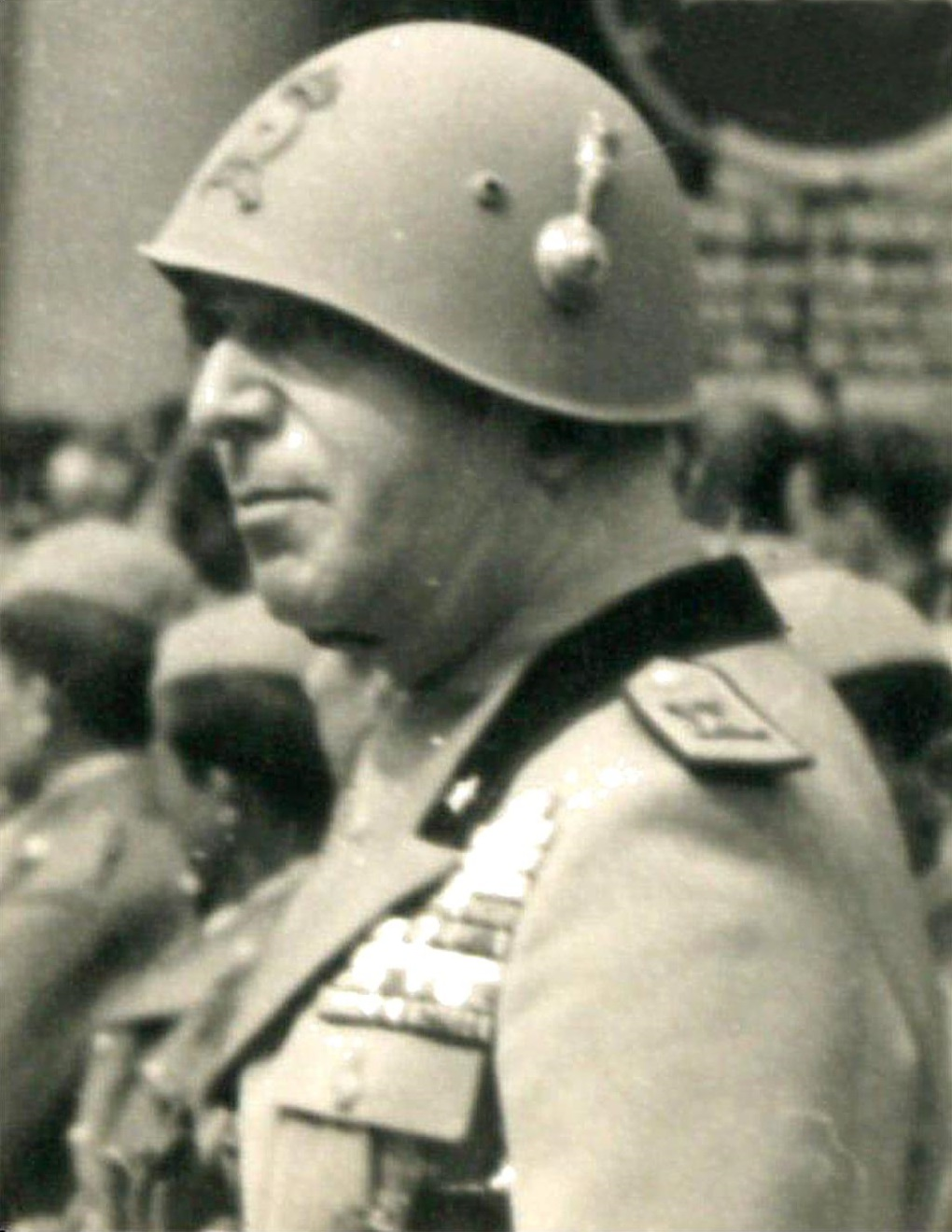
- Born: 9 September 1889; Bardolino, Kingdom of Italy
- Died: 1953 (age 64); Castellamonte, Italy
- Military career
- Allegiance: Kingdom of Italy
- Branch: Royal Italian Army
- Rank: Brigadier General
- Commands: 11th Eritrean Battalion; 11th Colonial Brigade; Turin Military Area; 31st Infantry Division Calabria
- Conflicts: World War I; Pacification of Libya; Second Italo-Ethiopian War; World War II; Italian campaign on the Eastern Front; Italian occupation of Greece
- Awards: Silver Medal of Military Valor (five times); Bronze Medal of Military Valor (twice); War Cross for Military Valor

Arduino Garelli (9 September 1889 – 1953) was an Italian general during World War II.

== Early life and career ==
Garelli was born in the province of Verona in 1889, the son of Roberto Garelli, and enrolled at the Military Academy of Modena in 1909, graduating as infantry second lieutenant on 21 October 1909, assigned to the 65 Infantry Regiment and later to the 66th Infantry Regiment. He was later promoted to lieutenant, to captain on 18 August 1915 and to major on 13 September 1917, participating in the Great War initially with the 233rd Infantry Regiment (he was wounded in July 1916 during an action on the Asiago plateau, for which he was awarded a Bronze Medal of Military Valor) and then in the Royal Corps of Colonial Troops of Somalia.

He was later repatriated and assigned to the 71st Infantry Regiment until 17 November 1923, when he was transferred to the Royal Corps of Colonial Troops of Eritrean, commanding the 11th Eritrean Battalion with the rank of major and participating in the pacification of Libya, obtaining a Silver Medal of Military Valor for an action near Buerat on 17–19 April 1924.

He moved to Cyrenaica from the following May and obtained another silver medal for the counterguerrilla campaign which lasted until April 1926. On 2 March 1927 he was promoted to lieutenant colonel, and on 20 May 1928 he was transferred to the Royal Corps of Colonial Troops of Cyrenaica, receiving another two Silver Medals, a Bronze Medal and a War Cross for Military Valor for successful actions against Libyan guerrillas.

After returning to Italy, he was first assigned to the command of the Military District of Turin, and from 28 March 1936 he assumed command of a Libyan battalion stationed near Sirte; on the following 9 October, his unit was transferred to Eritrea, where he became commander of the 11th Colonial Brigade and was promoted to colonel on 1 January 1937, receiving a further two Silver Medal for victories scored against Ethiopian guerrillas in the Scioa between December 1936 and March 1937 and in August 1937.

He then returned from Eritrea on 8 November 1937, and was given command of the military area of Turin; in 1940 he was transferred to the Royal Corps of Colonial Troops of Libya.

From 6 April 1941 he served at the headquarters of the I Army Corps in Turin and later, from 22 August, he was attached to the Italian Expeditionary Corps in Russia (CSIR) for special assignments. From 1 January 1942, after promotion to brigadier general, he returned to Turin, where he was attached to the Territorial Defence Command, after which he was given command of the infantry of the 33rd Infantry Division Acqui, stationed in the Ionian Islands, from 10 May 1942 to 15 June 1943.

In June 1943, he was replaced in this post by General Luigi Gherzi, and made infantry commander of the 31st Infantry Division Calabria, stationed in Sassari. On 1 September 1943 he assumed command of the entire division, replacing General Giovanni Casula.

After the armistice of Cassibile he remained in command of the Calabria Division (which in late 1943 was reorganized as a division for internal security, essentially with tasks of public order) until 1944.

After the war he was the first president of the Turin section of the "Acqui" Division Veterans' Association. He died in 1953 in Castellamonte (Turin).
