= Lake Coghinas =

Lake Coghinas Lago di Coghinas Lagu Coghinas
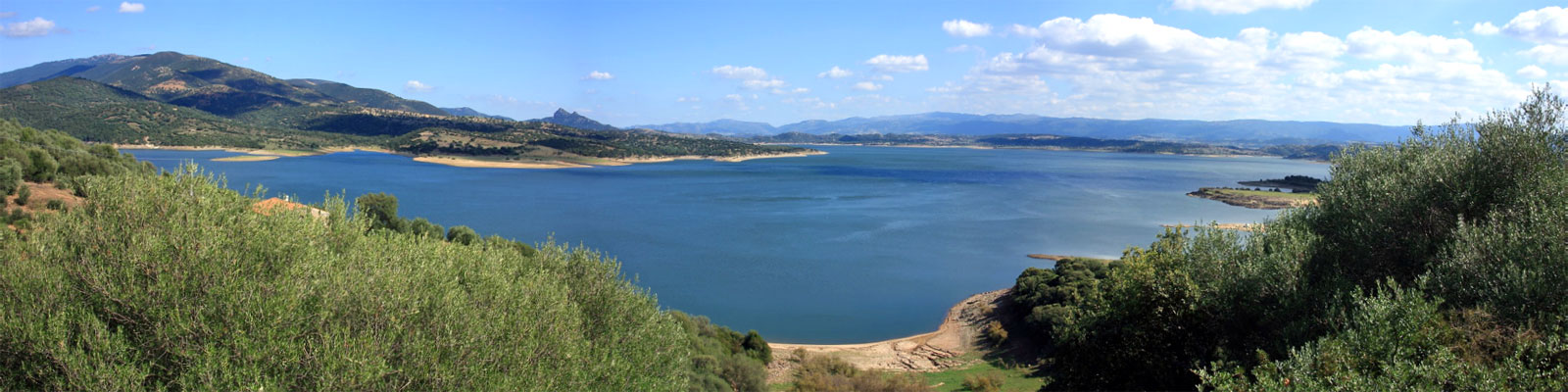

- Location within Sardinia
- Location: Northern Sardinia
- Coordinates: 40.740754°N 9.042091°E
- Type: artificial lake
- Primary inflows: Coghinas River, Rio Mannu
- Primary outflows: Coghinas River
- Basin countries: Italy
- Surface area: 17.8 km^{2} (6.9 sq mi)
- Max. depth: 50 m (160 ft)
- Water volume: 254×10^{6} m^{3} (206,000 acre⋅ft)

Lake Coghinas (Italian: Lago di Coghinas, Sardinian: Lagu Coghinas) is an artificial lake, in northern Sardinia, Italy, located in the province of Sassari. With a surface of 17.8 km^{2} and a capacity of 254 million cubic metres of water, it is the second largest lake in the region (second only to Lake Omodeo) and one of the major reservoirs in Italy.

The dam, constructed under Fascism in 1924, is 185 metres long and 58 metres wide. It has the function of water supply, but it also has a hydroelectric power plant.

The lake is the home of a rich ecosystem, and it has become a tourist attraction. Around its shores are present a youth hostel, restaurants, a sailing club.
