= Trinità d'Agultu e Vignola =

Trinità d'Agultu e Vignola Trinidade e Bignolas (Sardinian) Trinitài e Vignòla (Gallurese)
- Comune
- Comune di Trinità d'Agultu e Vignola
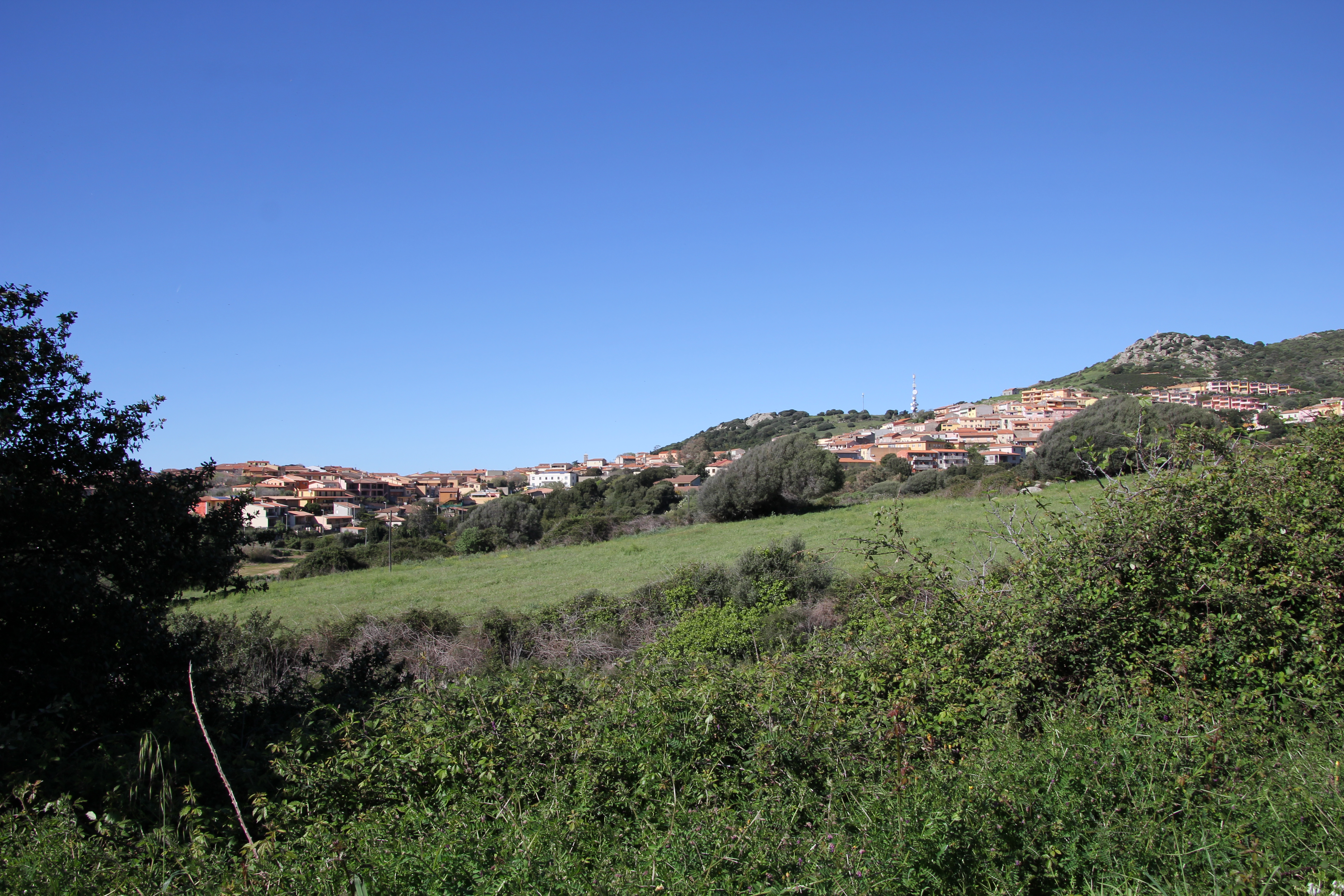
- View of Trinità d'Agultu e Vignola

- Coat of arms

- Location within Sardinia
- Coordinates: 40°59′N 8°55′E
- Country: Italy
- Region: Sardinia
- Province: Gallura North-East Sardinia
- Frazioni: Isola Rossa, La Scalitta, Lu Colbu, Paduledda, Vignola

Government
  - Mayor: Anna Muretti

Area
  - Total: 134.00 km^{2} (51.74 sq mi)
- Elevation: 365 m (1,198 ft)

Population (2026)
  - Total: 2,579
  - Density: 19.25/km^{2} (49.85/sq mi)
- Demonym: Trinitaiesi
- Time zone: UTC+1 (CET)
  - Summer (DST): UTC+2 (CEST)
- Postal code: 07038
- Dialing code: 079
- Website: Official website

Trinità d'Agultu e Vignola (Sardinian: Trinidade e Bignolas, Gallurese: Trinitài e Vignòla) is a town and comune (municipality) in the Province of Gallura North-East Sardinia in the autonomous island region of Sardinia in Italy, located about 200 kilometres (120 mi) north of Cagliari and about 50 kilometres (31 mi) west of Olbia. It has 2,579 inhabitants.

Trinità d'Agultu e Vignola borders the municipalities of Aggius, Aglientu, Badesi, Viddalba.

The main economical activity is summer tourism.

== Demographics ==
As of 2026, the population is 2,579, of which 53.8% are male, and 46.2% are female. Minors make up 9.6% of the population, and seniors make up 26.1%.

Historical population

Year	Pop.	±%
1861	733	—
1871	728	−0.7%
1881	776	+6.6%
1901	1,005	+29.5%
1911	1,206	+20.0%
1921	1,264	+4.8%
1931	1,251	−1.0%
1936	1,631	+30.4%

Year	Pop.	±%
1951	1,805	+10.7%
1961	1,934	+7.1%
1971	1,895	−2.0%
1981	1,922	+1.4%
1991	1,971	+2.5%
2001	2,026	+2.8%
2011	2,155	+6.4%
2021	2,239	+3.9%

Source: ISTAT

=== Immigration ===
As of 2025, immigrants make up 20.6% of the total population. The 5 largest foreign countries of birth are Pakistan, Bangladesh, Russia, Tunisia, and Romania.
