= Aggius =

Aggius Azos (Sardinian) Agghju (Gallurese)
- Comune
- Comune di Aggius
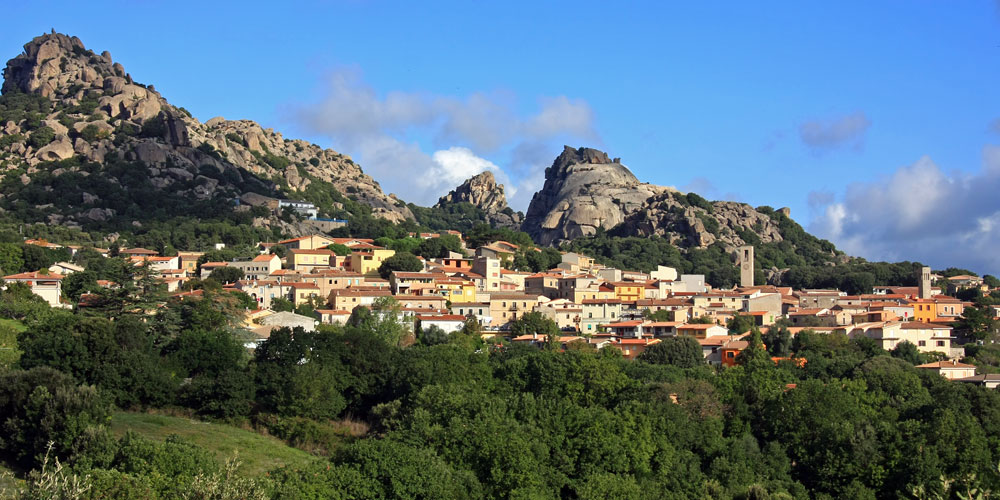
- View of Aggius

- Location within Italy Location within Sardinia
- Coordinates: 40°55′23″N 9°3′52″E
- Country: Italy
- Region: Sardinia
- Province: Gallura North-East Sardinia
- Frazioni: Bonaita

Government
  - Mayor: Nicola Muzzu

Area
  - Total: 86.31 km^{2} (33.32 sq mi)
- Elevation: 514 m (1,686 ft)

Population (2026)
  - Total: 1,378
  - Density: 15.97/km^{2} (41.35/sq mi)
- Demonym: Aggesi
- Time zone: UTC+1 (CET)
  - Summer (DST): UTC+2 (CEST)
- Postal code: 07020
- Dialing code: 079
- Website: Official website

Aggius (Sardinian: Azos, Gallurese: Agghju) is a town and comune (municipality) in the Province of Gallura North-East Sardinia in the autonomous island region of Sardinia in Italy, located about 190 kilometres (120 mi) north of Cagliari and about 35 kilometres (22 mi) west of Olbia. It has 1,378 inhabitants.

Aggius borders the municipalities of Aglientu, Bortigiadas, Tempio Pausania, Trinità d'Agultu e Vignola, and Viddalba.

== Demographics ==
As of 2026, the population is 1,378, of which 47.8% are male, and 52.2% are female. Minors make up 11.8% of the population, and seniors make up 31.0%.

Historical population

Year	Pop.	±%
1861	595	—
1871	592	−0.5%
1881	630	+6.4%
1901	816	+29.5%
1911	908	+11.3%
1921	918	+1.1%
1931	1,208	+31.6%
1936	1,205	−0.2%

Year	Pop.	±%
1951	1,490	+23.7%
1961	1,761	+18.2%
1971	1,747	−0.8%
1981	1,781	+1.9%
1991	1,787	+0.3%
2001	1,686	−5.7%
2011	1,602	−5.0%
2021	1,405	−12.3%

Source: ISTAT

=== Immigration ===
As of 2025, immigrants make up 3.5% of the total population. The 5 largest foreign countries of birth are Morocco, France, Belgium, Germany, and Romania.
