= Valledoria =

Valledoria Codaruina
- Comune
- Comune di Valledoria
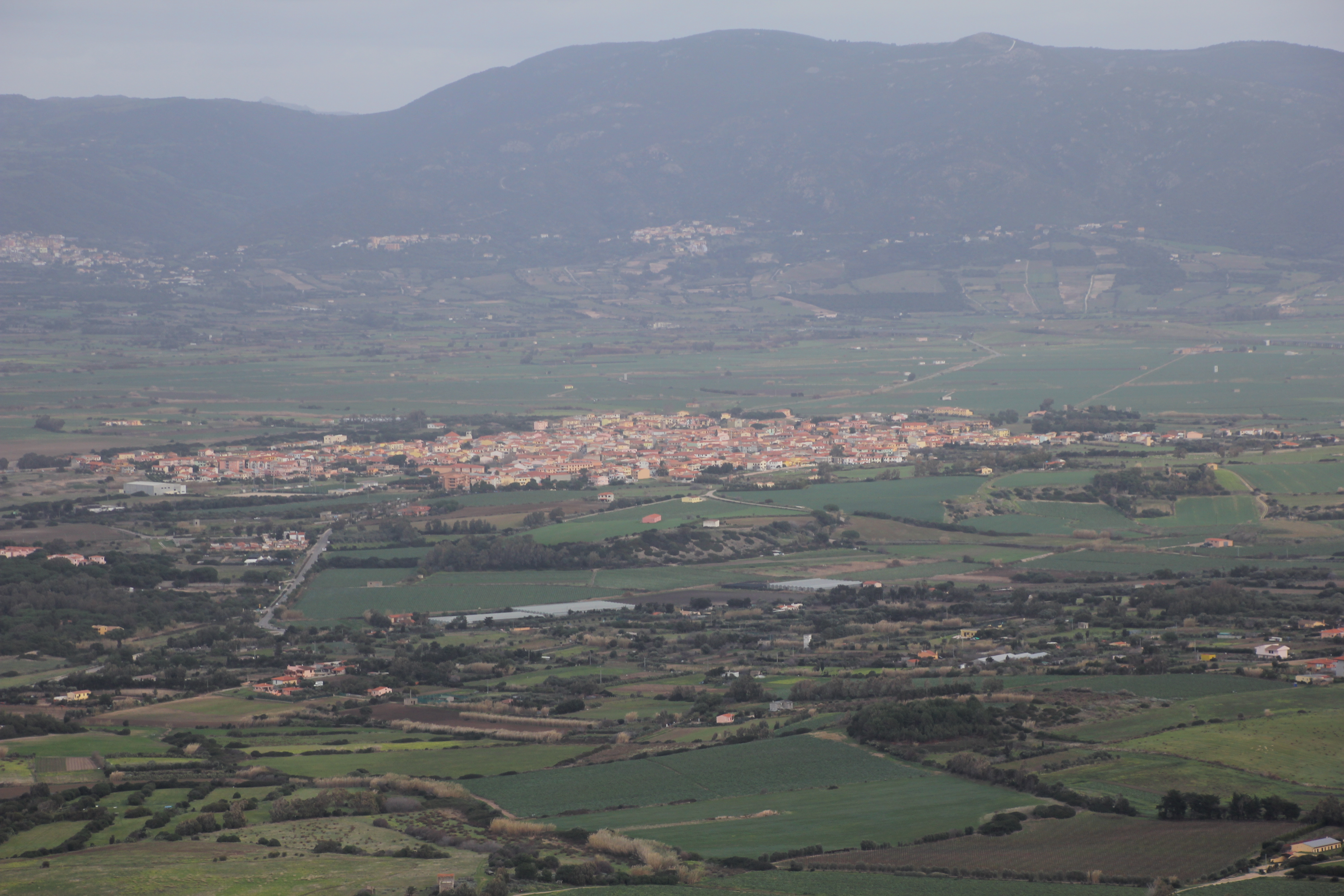
- Panorama

- Coat of arms

- Location within Sardinia
- Coordinates: 40°56′N 08°49′E
- Country: Italy
- Region: Sardinia
- Metropolitan city: Sassari (SS)
- Frazioni: La Ciaccia, La Muddizza

Government
  - Mayor: Paolo Spezziga

Area
  - Total: 24.45 km^{2} (9.44 sq mi)
- Elevation: 16 m (52 ft)

Population (28 February 2017)
  - Total: 4,319
  - Density: 176.6/km^{2} (457.5/sq mi)
- Demonym: Valledoriani or Codaruinesi
- Time zone: UTC+1 (CET)
  - Summer (DST): UTC+2 (CEST)
- Postal code: 07039
- Dialing code: 079
- Website: Official website

Valledoria (Gallurese: Codaruìna; Sardinian: Codaruìna; Sassarese: Codaruìna) is a town and comune in the Metropolitan City of Sassari situated at the center of the Gulf of Asinara, near the mouth of the Coghinas river.

== History ==
Valledoria was part of the giudicato of Torres, and was later acquired by the Genoese family of Doria. After the Aragonese conquest of Sardinia, the area was struck by plague which highly depopulated it.

A demographic rise occurred in the early 19th century, when new settlers coming from Aggius and Tempio Pausania created Codaruina. In 1960 the latter became an autonomous commune with the name of Valledoria. In 1983 the frazione of Santa Maria Coghinas became an independent commune.
