= 7th Infantry Division "Lupi di Toscana" =

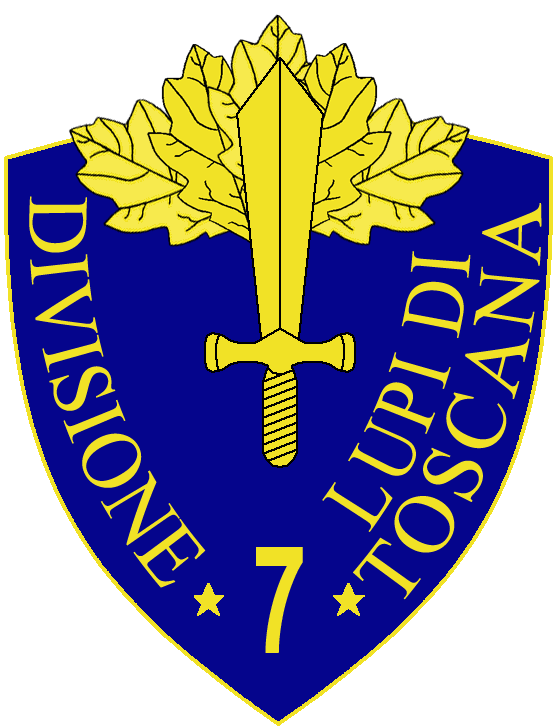
- 7th Infantry Division "Lupi di Toscana" insignia
- Active: 1938–1943
- Country: Kingdom of Italy
- Branch: Royal Italian Army
- Type: Infantry
- Size: Division
- Garrison/HQ: Brescia
- Engagements: World War II

Commanders
- Notable commanders: Ottavio Priore

Insignia
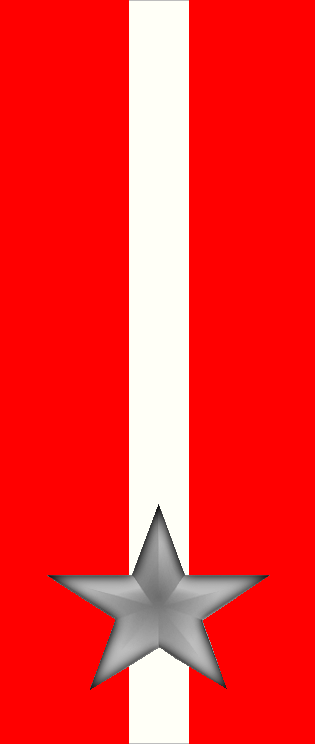
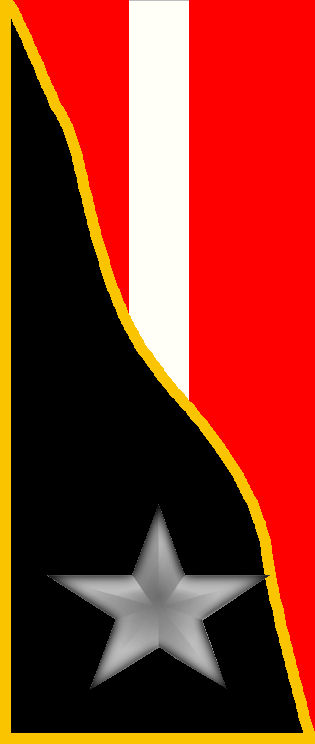
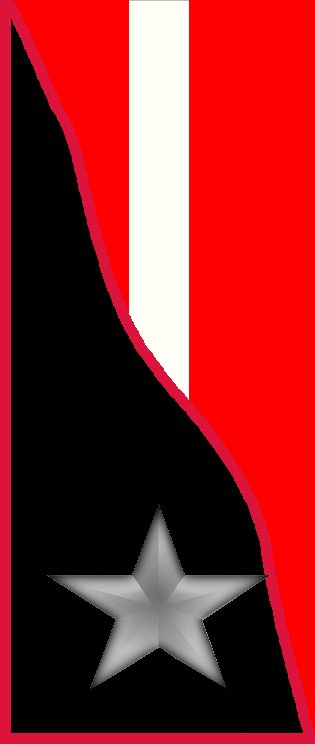
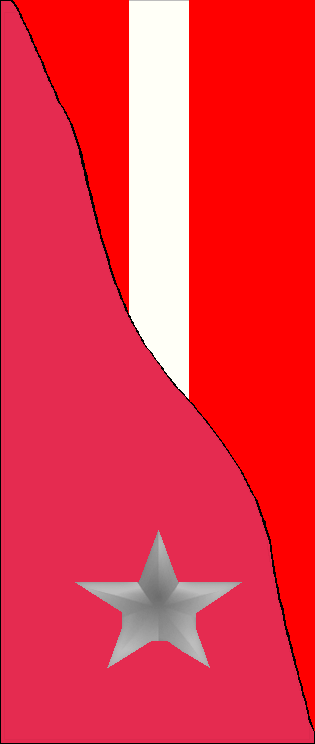
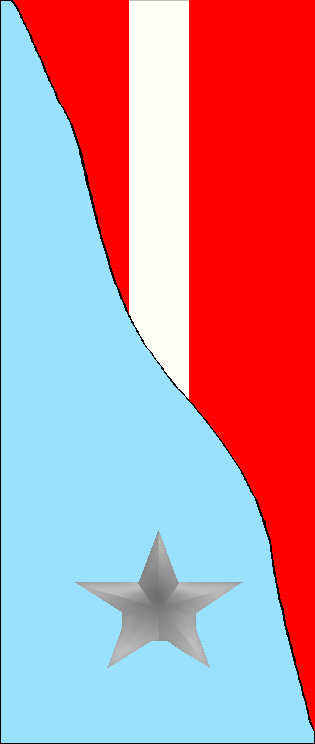
- Identification symbol: Lupi di Toscana gorget patches

The 7th Infantry Division "Lupi di Toscana" (Italian: 7ª Divisione di fanteria "Lupi di Toscana" English: Wolves of Tuscany) was an infantry division of the Royal Italian Army during World War II. The Division, with the exception of the 78th Infantry Regiment based in Bergamo, was based in Brescia. Despite its name referencing the region of Tuscany, the division was formed by men from Lombardy, especially from Brescia, Bergamo and the surrounding valleys.

== History ==
The division's lineage begins with the Brigade "Granatieri di Toscana" established on 1 July 1862 with the 7th and 8th grenadier regiments. On 5 March 1871 the brigade was assigned to the infantry and renamed Brigade "Toscana". On the same date brigade's two regiments were renamed 77th Infantry Regiment and 78th Infantry Regiment.

=== World War I ===
The brigade fought on the Italian front in World War I. On 3 November 1916 during the Ninth Battle of the Isonzo the brigade took the Dosso Fáiti hill, for which the brigade's two regiments were awarded each a Gold Medal of Military Valor. On 30 September 1926 the brigade assumed the name of VII Infantry Brigade and received the 50th Infantry Regiment "Parma" from the disbanded Brigade "Parma". The brigade was the infantry component of the 7th Territorial Division of Brescia, which also included the 30th Artillery Regiment. In 1934 the division changed its name to 7th Infantry Division "Leonessa". On 15 December 1938 the division dissolved the VII Infantry Brigade and changed its name to 7th Infantry Division "Lupi di Toscana"; the same name change applied also to the 77th and 78th infantry and 30th artillery regiments. On 12 September 1939 the division ceded the 50th Infantry Regiment "Parma" to the newly activated 49th Infantry Division "Parma".

=== World War II ===
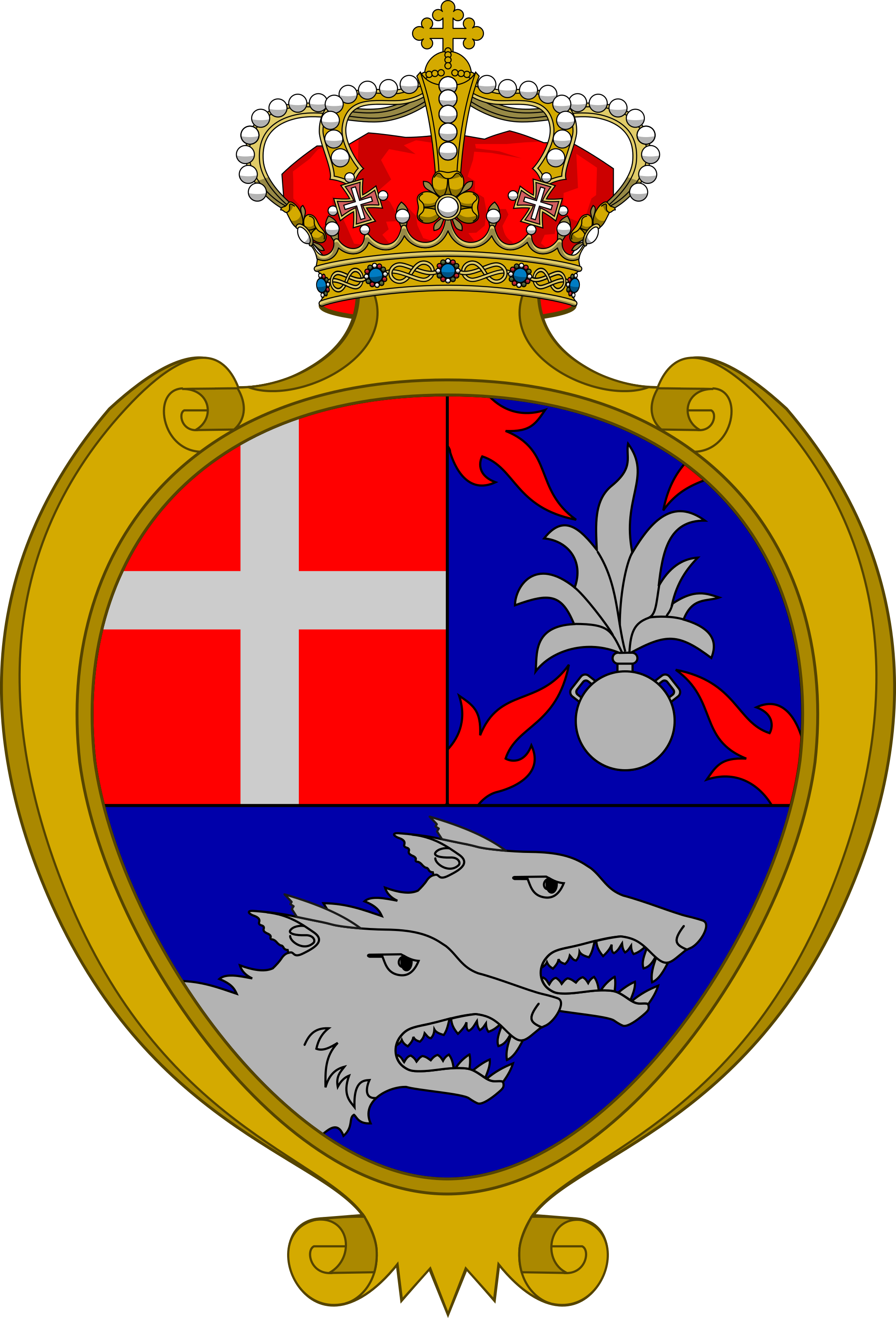
Coat of Arms of the 77th Infantry Regiment "Lupi di Toscana", 1939

The Lupi di Toscana took part in the Italian invasion of Albania landing in Durrës on 19 April 1939. Within 15 days, it assumed occupation duties in the Pogradec-Korçë-Ersekë area until 20 December 1939. After returning to Italy the Lupi di Toscana was part of the Army reserve during the Italian invasion of France in June 1940.

==== Greco-Italian War ====
During the Greco-Italian War the Lupi di Toscana was sent as reinforcement to Albania arriving in early January 1941. An initial attack on Greek positions was made on 8 January 1941 near Taronine, Përmet District. The Lupi di Toscana held nearby peaks until 12 January 1941, after which it started to disintegrate. One of the infantry regiments was surrounded and annihilated on 15 January 1941, while other units were shattered, and the remaining soldiers fled toward Qafa e Bubesit on 18–21 January 1941. The Lupi di Toscana was relieved of front-line duty on 26 January 1941 and sent to Karbunare to regroup. The division returned to the front-line on 2 March 1941 and was sent to protect the Dragot bridge east of Tepelenë on 12 March 1941, under command of XXV Army Corps. The division was then assigned to the reserve of the 11th Army, guarding the area of Lepenicë on 18 March 1941. From 19 March 1941, until 26 March 1941 it fought a defensive battle south-east of Tepelenë. On 13 April 1941, the Lupi di Toscana was back on the offensive, capturing Mezigoran and Peshtan villages. Then it continued to advance toward Sopik in Gjirokastër District, reaching the Greek-Albanian border on 21 April 1941. From 24 April 1941 the Lupi di Toscana stayed near Kerásovo in the Epirus region in Greece.

In October 1941 the Lupi di Toscana returned to Italy. In February 1942 the Lupi di Toscana was transferred to Cosenza, Catanzaro, Nicastro and Reggio Calabria in Calabria, where it performed coastal defence duties. In August 1942 the division was transferred to Liguria, between Genoa and Alassio. On 3–9 November 1942 the division participated in Case Anton the Axis invasion of Vichy France. Afterwards the division remained on garrison duty in occupied France; initially between Menton and Nice and then in Grasse and Cagnes-sur-Mer, and finally in Fuveau-Rousset, Bouches-du-Rhône-Châteauneuf-le-Rouge. The division performed coastal defense duties at Ollioules until 3 September 1943 when it was ordered to Rome. Between 6-8 September three infantry battalions and some minor units of the division arrived in Lazio. The battalions were ordered to defend the airfields at Furbara and Cerveteri, where the Italian government hoped the American 82nd Airborne Division would land to support the Royal Italian Army's defense of Rome once the Armistice of Cassibile would be announced. After the armistice was announced on 8 September 1943 the Lupi di Toscana resisted invading German forces until 12 September.

== Organization ==
7th Infantry Division "Lupi di Toscana" organization in 1940

- 7th Infantry Division "Lupi di Toscana"
  - Headquarters
    - Command Company
    - 20th Carabinieri Section
    - 21st Carabinieri Section
    - 95th Field Post Office
    - 7th Infantry Division Command Transport Squad
  - 77th Infantry Regiment "Lupi di Toscana"
    - Command Company
    - 3 × Fusilier battalions
    - Support Weapons Battery (65/17 mod. 13 infantry support guns)
    - Mortar Company (81mm mod. 35 mortars)
  - 78th Infantry Regiment "Lupi di Toscana"
    - Command Company
    - 3 × Fusilier battalions
    - Support Weapons Battery (65/17 mod. 13 infantry support guns)
    - Mortar Company (81mm mod. 35 mortars)
  - 30th Artillery Regiment "Lupi di Toscana"
    - Command Unit
    - I Group (100/17 mod. 14 howitzers)
    - II Group (75/27 mod. 11 field guns; transferred in December 1940 to the 13th Artillery Regiment "Granatieri di Sardegna")
    - II Group (75/13 mod. 15 mountain guns; transferred in December 1940 from the 13th Artillery Regiment "Granatieri di Sardegna")
    - III Group (75/13 mod. 15 mountain guns)
    - IV Group (100/17 mod. 14 howitzers; joined the regiment in January 1943)
    - 1 × Anti-aircraft battery (20/65 mod. 35 anti-aircraft guns)
    - Ammunition and Supply Unit
  - VII Mortar Battalion (81mm mod. 35 mortars)
  - 7th Anti-tank Company (47/32 mod. 35 anti-tank guns)
  - 7th Telegraph and Radio Operators Company
  - 26th Engineer Company
  - 7th Autocarrette Section
  - 13th Supply Section
  - 30th Medical Section
    - 3 × Field hospitals
    - 1 × Surgical Unit
  - 807th Transport Section

Attached during the invasion of France in 1940:

- XV CC.NN. Battalion

Attached from December 1940 until the middle of 1942:

- 15th CC.NN. Legion "Leonessa"
  - Command Company
  - XIV CC.NN. Battalion
  - XV CC.NN. Battalion
  - 15th CC.NN. Machine Gun Company

== Commanding officers ==
The division's commanding officers were:

- Generale di Divisione Edmondo Rossi (10 January 1939 - 15 July 1939)
- Generale di Divisione Ottavio Bollea (16 July 1939 - 17 January 1941)
- Generale di Brigata Lauro Riviera (18 January 1941 - 8 February 1941)
- Generale di Divisione Gustavo Reisoli-Matthieu (9 February 1941 - 30 March 1941)
- Generale di Divisione Pier Domenico Mazzari (1 April 1941 - 18 April 1941)
- Generale di Divisione Gustavo Reisoli Matthieu (19 April 1941 - 4 May 1943)
- Generale di Divisione Ernesto Cappa (5 May 1943 - 12 September 1943)
