= Gustavo Reisoli =

Italian general

- Born: 5 June 1887; Turin, Kingdom of Italy
- Died: 27 November 1955 (aged 68); Turin, Italy
- Military career
- Allegiance: Kingdom of Italy
- Branch: Royal Italian Army
- Rank: Lieutenant General
- Commands: 21st Infantry Brigade Brennero; Bolzano Corps, GAF; III Corps, GAF; 7th Infantry Division Lupi di Toscana; XIII Army Corps
- Conflicts: Italo-Turkish War; World War I; Spanish Civil War; World War II; Greco-Italian War; Operation Anton
- Awards: Silver Medal of Military Valour

Gustavo Reisoli Matthieu di Pian Villar (5 June 1887 – 29 November 1955) was an Italian general during World War II.

== Biography ==
He was born in Turin in 1887 into a noble family and pursued a military career, being appointed infantry second lieutenant in the Royal Italian Army in 1907. He later attended the Italian Army War School and participated in the Italo-Turkish War, fighting in Libya, and in World War I, rising from captain to major. In the late 1930s he participated in the Spanish Civil War as Commander of the Cavalry of the Corpo Truppe Volontarie's Fast Scouting Group; in 1938 he was promoted to brigadier general and given command of the 21st Infantry Brigade Brennero, and after its reorganization as a Division in September 1938 he became its deputy commander.

From March to September 1939 Reisoli commanded the Bolzano Corps of the Guardia alla Frontiera (GAF), after which he was attached to the Ministry of War; in February 1940 he became deputy commander of the 52nd Infantry Division "Torino", with headquarters in Civitavecchia, and in May he was appointed deputy commander of the 1st Infantry Division Superga. On 10 June 1940, the day of Italy's entrance into the Second World War, he became commander of the I Corps of the GAF, operating within the 4th Army.

From 11 February 1941 to 4 May 1943 he was commander of the 7th Infantry Division Lupi di Toscana, which he led during the Greco-Italian War, earning a Silver Medal of Military Valour; afterwards he was stationed with his division in Greece till October 1941, in Lombardy till February 1942, in Calabria till August, in Liguria till November 1942 and finally in Provence. In May 1943, after promotion to Major General, he was given command of the XIII Army Corps, stationed in southern Sardinia, with headquarters in Nuraminis.

After the Armistice of Cassibile he collaborated with the general staff of Brindisi in the reconstruction of the Italian armed forces, and later became head of the press office of the "Kingdom of the South". He was subsequently appointed commander of the reorganization camps in Lecce and of the 212th Italian Command in Naples.

After the war, he became a member of the central committee of the Armata Italiana della Libertà ("Italian Army of Freedom"), a secret stay-behind anti-Communist organization founded in 1947 by Ettore Musco. He retired from the Army with the rank of Lieutenant General.

In private life, Reisoli was a lecturer and author of numerous military history books, as well as some poems and novels. He was also one an Italian pioneer of science fiction, with his political fiction novel La disfatta dei mostri, published in 1940.

He died in his native Turin in 1955, at the age of 68.
