= 220th Coastal Division =

Royal Italian Army infantry division during World War II

- Active: 1942 – 1943
- Country: Kingdom of Italy
- Branch: Royal Italian Army
- Size: Division
- Garrison/HQ: Santa Severa
- Engagements: World War II

Insignia
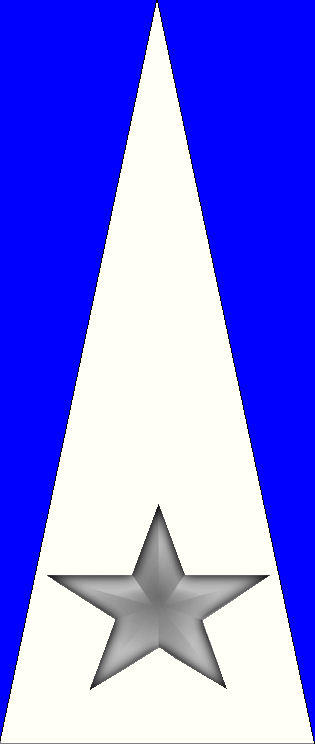
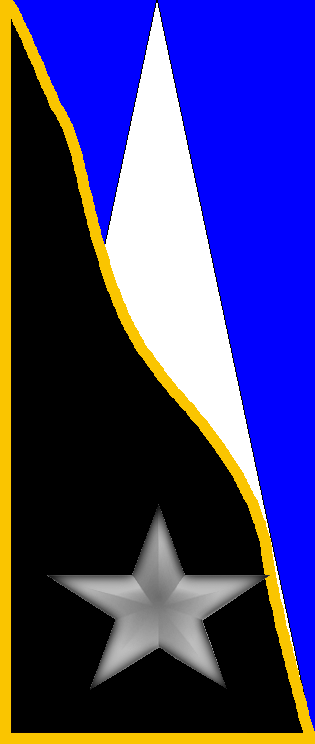
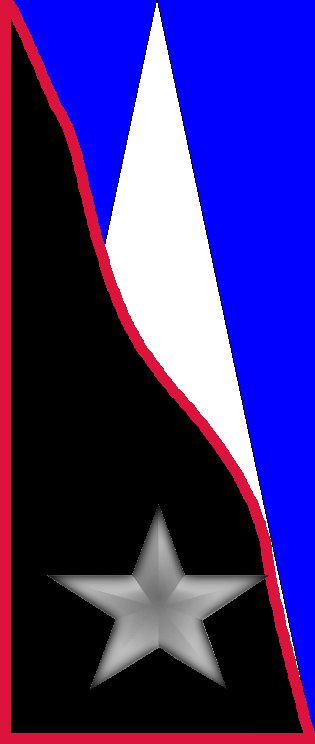
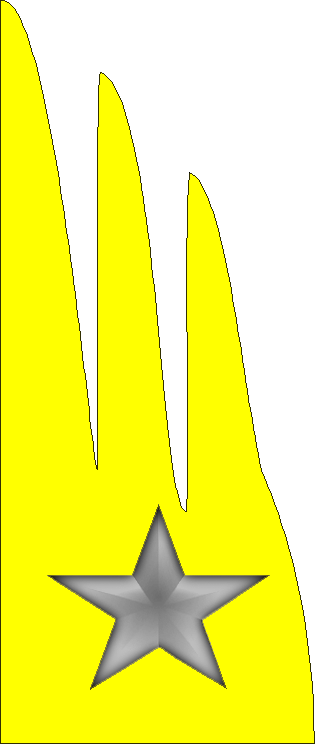
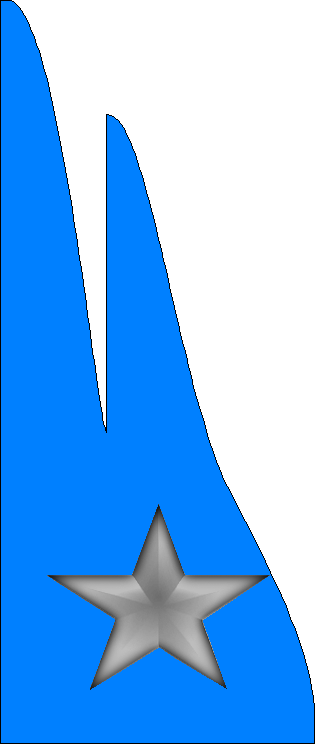
- Identification symbol: 220th Coastal Division gorget patches

The 220th Coastal Division (Italian: 220ª Divisione Costiera) was an infantry division of the Royal Italian Army during World War II. Royal Italian Army coastal divisions were second line divisions formed with reservists and equipped with second rate materiel. They were often commanded by officers called out of retirement.

== History ==
The division was activated on 15 April 1942 in Rome by uniting the two coastal defense sectors "Civitavecchia" and "Magliana". The division was assigned to XVII Army Corps and based its headquarter in Santa Severa. The division was responsible for the coastal defense of the coast of northern Lazio between the rivers Chiarone and Astura. The division was also responsible for the defense of the harbor of Civitavecchia and the city of Anzio.

After the announcement of the Armistice of Cassibile on 8 September 1943 the division was disbanded by invading German forces.

== Organization ==
- 220th Coastal Division, in Santa Severa
  - 111th Coastal Regiment
    - 3 × Coastal battalion
  - 152nd Coastal Regiment
    - 3 × Coastal battalion
  - 23rd Coastal Artillery Regiment
  - 220th Carabinieri Section
  - 182nd Field Post Office
  - Division Services

Attached to the division:

- Harbor Defense Command Civitavecchia
  - III Dismounted Squadrons Group "Genova Cavalleria"
  - IV Dismounted Squadrons Group "Genova Cavalleria"
  - CCCXXV Coastal Battalion
  - CVIII Coastal Artillery Group

If needed the division would have been reinforced by personnel and units of the following:

- 10th Arditi Regiment, in Santa Severa
  - III Arditi Battalion
  - IV Arditi Battalion
- 1 × Battalion from the Marine Infantry Regiment "San Marco", in Nettuno (Royal Italian Navy)
- II Training Battalions Group, in Nettuno
  - 1 × Alpini training battalion
- Paratroopers Training Center, in Tarquinia
  - 1 × Paratroopers training battalion
- 3rd Infantry Experiences Training Center, in Anzio
- Coastal Recruits School, in Civitavecchia
- Artillery Officer Recruits School, in Cerveteri
  - 1 × Artillery group
- Sapper School, in Civitavecchia
  - 2 × Sapper battalions
- CC.NN. Anti-aircraft School, in Anzio
- Guardia di Finanza Non-Commissioned Officer Recruits School, in Ostia Lido
- Aeronautical Personal Assistance Center, in Ostia Lido (Royal Italian Air Force)
- Telecommunications Personnel Training Center, in Anzio (Royal Italian Air Force)
- Gioventù Italiana del Littorio Pre-military Instructors Center, in Civitavecchia

On 8 September 1943 the XXXIV Coastal Brigade, which had been activated on 16 August 1943 and consisted of four battalions that were still in the process of forming, was assigned to the division.

== Commanding officers ==
The division's commanding officers were:

- Generale di Brigata Oreste Sant'Andrea (15 April 1942 - September 1943)
