= XIII Army Corps (Italy) =

Royal Italian Army corps between 1915 and 1945

The XIII Army Corps (Italian: XIII Corpo d'Armata) was a corps of the Royal Italian Army between 1915 and 1945.

== History ==
There was an XIII Corps in World War I formed in Rome on 20 May 1915 and dissolved on 15 December 1918.

It was reconstituted in 1926 as Military Command of Sardinia and renamed XIII Army Corps on 11 October 1934.

During World War II, the XIII Corps was responsible for the defense of Sardinia. In May, the Corps became subordinate to Antonio Basso, the Armed Forces Commander of Sardinia. Army Corps XIII was responsible for the Southern Sector and Army Corps XXX for the Northern Sector.

When the Armistice of Cassibile was announced, on 8 September 1943, Basso negotiated a peaceful evacuation of the 23,000 Germans on the island towards Corsica, so the XIII Corps was only involved in some minor clashes with German stragglers.

On 13 January 1945, the Corps was dissolved and reformed into the Regional Military Command of Sicily.

== Composition (1943) ==
- 30th Infantry Division "Sabauda"
- 31st Infantry Division "Calabria"
- 184th Infantry Division "Nembo" (partly)
- 203rd Coastal Division
- 205th Coastal Division
- XXXIII Brigata costiera

== Commanders ==
- Augusto de Pignier (1937.03.25 – 1940.11.01)
- Antonio Basso (1940.11.01 – 1943.07.15)
- Gustavo Reisoli (1943.07.15 – 1943.09.08)
- Giovanni Battista Zenati (1943.09.10 – 1943.11) (acting)
- Angelico Carta (1943.11 – )
- Giovanni Magli (1944)
