= 31st Infantry Division "Calabria" =

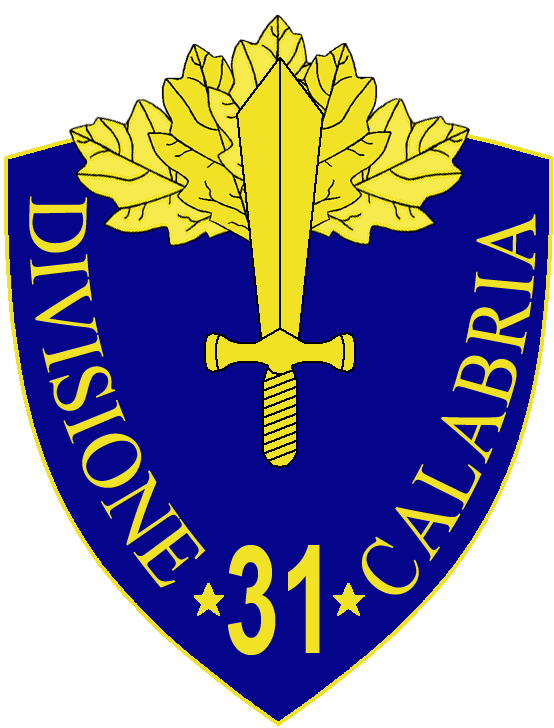
- 31st Infantry Division "Calabria" insignia
- Active: 1939–1945
- Country: Kingdom of Italy
- Branch: Royal Italian Army
- Type: Infantry
- Size: Division
- Garrison/HQ: Sassari
- Engagements: World War II

Commanders
- Notable commanders: General Riccardo Pentimalli; General Arduino Garelli

Insignia
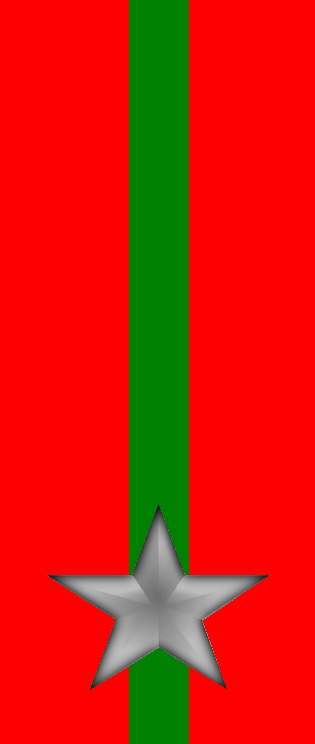
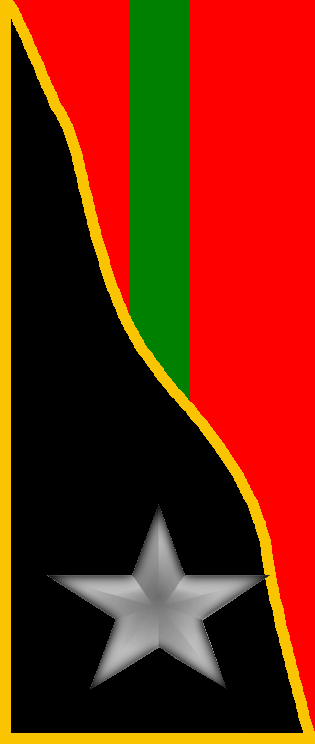
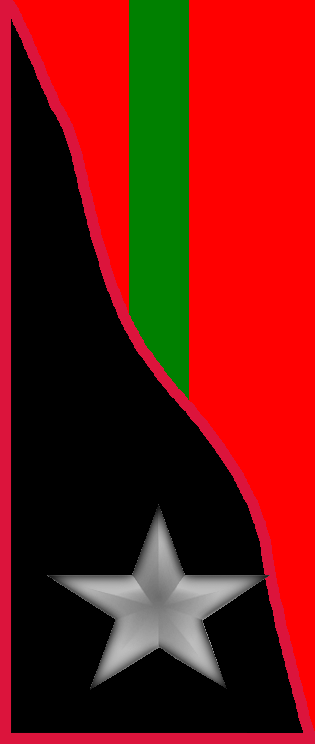
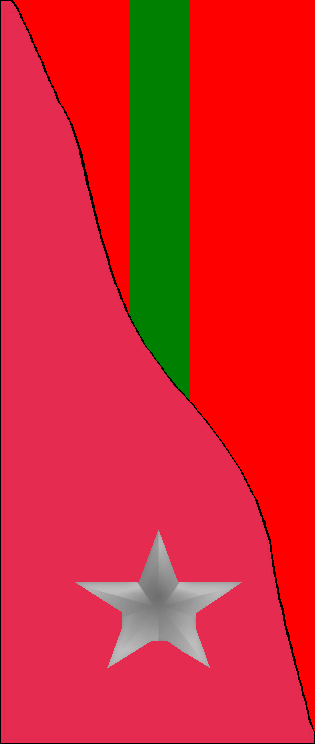
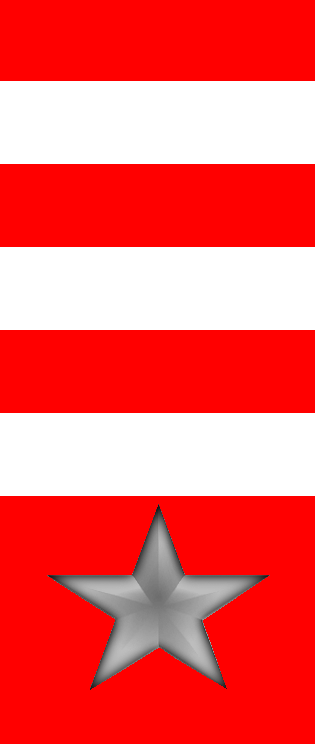
- Identification symbol: Calabria Division gorget patches

The 31st Infantry Division "Calabria" (Italian: 31ª Divisione di fanteria "Calabria") was an infantry division of the Royal Italian Army during World War II. The Calabria was formed in Sassari and named for the region of Calabria. The division was part of the garrison of Sardinia, where it remained until the Armistice of Cassibile, after which it served in the Italian Co-belligerent Army.

== History ==
The division's lineage begins with the Brigade "Calabria" established in Modena on 16 April 1861 with the 59th and 60th infantry regiments.

=== World War I ===
The brigade fought on the Italian front in World War I. On 31 October 1926 the brigade command and the 60th Infantry Regiment were disbanded, while the 59th Infantry Regiment "Calabria" was transferred to the XXX Infantry Brigade. The XXX Infantry Brigade, which also included the 45th Infantry Regiment "Reggio" and the 46th Infantry Regiment "Reggio", was the infantry component of the 30th Territorial Division of Cagliari.

In September 1934 the Military Command Sassari - 31st Infantry Division "Caprera" was formed in Sassari, which became responsible for the northern part of Sardinia. The Caprera formed the XXXI Infantry Brigade, which received the 45th Infantry Regiment "Reggio" and 59th Infantry Regiment "Calabria" from the Military Command Cagliari - 30th Infantry Division "Sabauda". To complete the Caprera the 40th Artillery Regiment was formed in Sassari.

In early 1939 the 45th Infantry Regiment "Reggio" in Sassari and the 60th Infantry Regiment "Calabria" in Iglesias switched names. On 15 October 1939 the division changed its name to "Calabria" and dissolved the XXXI Infantry Brigade, with the two infantry regiments coming under direct command of the division. On the same date the 40th Artillery Regiment received the name "Calabria". The division was tasked with the defence of northern Sardinia.

=== World War II ===
In 1940, the division was part of the XIII Army Corps and tasked with the defense of the northwestern coast of Sardinia, with garrisons in Sassari, Porto Torres, Alghero and Santa Teresa Gallura. In December 1941 the 204th Coastal Division was activated in Porto Torres, which took up the coastal defense duty, with the Calabria tasked as a mobile reserve behind the 204th Coastal Division. The Calabria, since 1943 part of the XXX Corps, remained at its positions until the Armistice of Cassibile was announced on 8 September 1943. On 9 September 1943 the division repositioned itself to defend Sassari from an expected attack by the German 90th Panzergrenadier Division. However the Wehrmacht decided to evacuate its forces to Corsica and the Italian units on Sardinia allowed them to withdraw unhindered. On 12–14 September 1943 the Calabria skirmished with the Germans at Martis and then at Trinità d'Agultu in an attempt to speed up their withdrawal from the island.

In 1944 the 236th Infantry Regiment "Piceno" joined the division, which on 25 September 1944 was reformed as Internal Security Division "Calabria" and for the rest of the war engaged primarily in airfield defence, policing and demining work.

=== Infantry Brigade "Calabria" ===
In May 1945 the division began to reform as the 31st Infantry Division "Calabria", however on 15 August 1946 the division was reduced to Infantry Brigade "Calabria", with the 236th Infantry Regiment "Piceno" disbanded and the 40th Artillery Regiment reduced to Mixed Artillery Group "Calabria". On 1 February 1948 the brigade was disbanded and the 59th Infantry Regiment "Calabria" moved to Palmanova in Friuli, where it joined the Infantry Division "Mantova".

== Organization ==
31st Infantry Division "Calabria" organization in 1940

- 31st Infantry Division "Calabria", in Sassari
  - Headquarters
    - Command Company
    - 91st Carabinieri Section
    - 92nd Carabinieri Section
    - 75th Field Post Office
    - 31st Infantry Division Command Transport Squad
  - 59th Infantry Regiment "Calabria", in Tempio Pausania
    - Command Company
    - 3 × Fusilier battalions
    - Support Weapons Battery (65/17 mod. 13 infantry support guns)
    - Mortar Company (81mm mod. 35 mortars)
  - 60th Infantry Regiment "Calabria", in Sassari
    - Command Company
    - 3 × Fusilier battalions
    - Support Weapons Battery (65/17 mod. 13 infantry support guns)
    - Mortar Company (81mm mod. 35 mortars)
  - 40th Artillery Regiment "Calabria", in Sassari
    - Command Unit
    - I Group (75/27 mod. 11 field guns; transferred on 8 December 1941 to the 13th Artillery Grouping of the XIII Army Corps)
    - I Group (100/17 mod. 14 howitzers; joined the regiment on 1 April 1943)
    - II Group (75/13 mod. 15 mountain guns; transferred on 2 August 1941 to the 7th Artillery Regiment "Cremona")
    - II Group (75/27 mod. 11 field guns; transferred on 2 August 1941 from the 7th Artillery Regiment "Cremona")
    - III Group (75/13 mod. 15 mountain guns)
    - CXXIX Group (149/13 howitzers; joined the regiment on 8 March 1943)
    - 331st Anti-aircraft Battery (20/65 mod. 35 anti-aircraft guns)
    - Ammunition and Supply Unit
  - VII Machine Gun Battalion (joined the division in 1943)
  - XXXI Mortar Battalion (81mm mod. 35 mortars)
  - 31st Anti-tank Company (47/32 mod. 35 anti-tank guns)
  - 195th Anti-tank Company (47/32 mod. 35 anti-tank guns; formed in 1942)
  - 11th Engineer Company
  - 31st Telegraph and Radio Operators Company
  - 50th Medical Section
    - 131st Field Hospital
    - 229th Field Hospital
    - 230th Field Hospital
    - 231st Field Hospital
    - 1 × Surgical unit
  - 31st Supply Section
  - 31st Transport Section
  - 1 × Autocarrette Section

Attached to the division in 1943:

- 177th CC.NN. Legion "Logudoro", in Sassari (renamed 359th Infantry Regiment "Calabria" on 1 November 1943)
  - CLXXVII CC.NN. Battalion (renamed I Battalion on 1 November 1943)
  - CLXXVIII CC.NN. Battalion (renamed II Battalion on 1 November 1943)
  - 177th CC.NN. Machine Gun Company (renamed 177th Machine Gunners Company on 1 November 1943)
- VII Machine Gun Battalion
- XVIII Tank Battalion M, 32nd Tank Infantry Regiment (M14/41 tanks)
- 55th Mortar Company (81mm mod. 35 mortars)
- 195th Mortar Company (81mm mod. 35 mortars)

== Commanding officers ==
The division's commanding officers were:

- Generale di Divisione Giovanni Vecchi (1 July 1937 - 9 June 1940)
- Generale di Brigata Carlo Petra di Caccuri (10 June 1940 - 18 October 1940)
- Generale di Divisione Gian Giacomo Castagna (19 October 1940 - 9 May 1943)
- Generale di Divisione Giovanni Casula (10 May 1943 - 24 November 1944)
