= List of municipalities of the Metropolitan City of Sassari =

This is a list of the 66 municipalities (comuni) of the Metropolitan City of Sassari in the autonomous region of Sardinia in Italy.

== List ==
Municipality	Native name	Population (2026)	Area (km²)	Density
Alghero	L'Alguer, S'Alighera	41,765	225.40	185.3
Anela	Anèla	553	36.89	15.0
Ardara	Àldara	680	38.19	17.8
Banari	Bànari	508	21.25	23.9
Benetutti	Benetùti	1,623	94.45	17.2
Bessude	Bessùde	369	26.79	13.8
Bonnanaro	Bunnànnaru	894	21.84	40.9
Bono	Bòno	3,232	74.54	43.4
Bonorva	Bonòlva	3,030	149.75	20.2
Borutta	Borùta	244	4.76	51.3
Bottidda	Bòtidda	627	33.71	18.6
Bultei	Urtèi	776	96.83	8.0
Bulzi	Bùltzi	507	21.67	23.4
Burgos	Su Bùrgu	817	18.08	45.2
Cargeghe	Calzèghe, Cagliègga	590	12.05	49.0
Castelsardo	Calthèddu, Castèddu Sardu	5,624	43.34	129.8
Cheremule	Cherèmule	378	24.25	15.6
Chiaramonti	Tzaramònte, Ciaramònti, Chjaramònti	1,494	98.61	15.2
Codrongianos	Codronzànu/Codronzànos	1,252	30.39	41.2
Cossoine	Cossoìne	739	39.17	18.9
Erula	Èrula	702	39.31	17.9
Esporlatu	Isporlàtu	360	18.40	19.6
Florinas	Fiolìnas	1,459	36.06	40.5
Giave	Tzàve	471	47.07	10.0
Illorai	Illorài	698	57.19	12.2
Ittireddu	Itirèddu	457	23.69	19.3
Ittiri	Ìtiri Cannèdu	7,730	111.46	69.4
Laerru	Laèrru	806	19.85	40.6
Mara	Màra	518	18.64	27.8
Martis	Màltis, Màlti	455	22.96	19.8
Monteleone Rocca Doria	Monteleòne	105	13.39	7.8
Mores	Mòres	1,663	94.86	17.5
Muros	Mùros	822	11.23	73.2
Nughedu San Nicolò	Nughèdu	710	67.89	10.5
Nule	Nule	1,259	51.95	24.2
Nulvi	Nùjvi	2,572	67.38	38.2
Olmedo	S'Ulumèdu	4,240	33.47	126.7
Osilo	Ósile, Ósili, Ósilu	2,732	98.03	27.9
Ossi	Ossi	5,344	30.09	177.6
Ozieri	Otièri	9,559	252.13	37.9
Padria	Pàdria	574	48.39	11.9
Pattada	Patàda	2,763	164.88	16.8
Perfugas	Pèifugas, Pèlfica	2,212	60.88	36.3
Ploaghe	Piàghe	4,201	96.27	43.6
Porto Torres	Posthudòrra, Portu Tùrre, Poltu Tùrri	20,624	104.41	197.5
Pozzomaggiore	Pottumajòre/Pottumaggiòre	2,286	78.77	29.0
Putifigari	Potuvìgari	658	53.10	12.4
Romana	Rumàna	457	21.60	21.2
Santa Maria Coghinas	Cuzìna	1,346	22.97	58.6
Sassari	Tàtari, Sàssari	120,231	547.04	219.8
Sedini	Sèddini	1,183	40.51	29.2
Semestene	Semèstene	127	39.58	3.2
Sennori	Sènnaru, Sènnari	6,657	31.34	212.4
Siligo	Sìligo	734	43.45	16.9
Sorso	Sòssu	14,394	67.01	214.8
Stintino	Isthintìni, Istintìnu	1,567	59.04	26.5
Tergu	Zèlgu	612	36.88	16.6
Thiesi	Tièsi	2,635	63.25	41.7
Tissi	Tissi	2,352	10.24	229.7
Torralba	Turàlva	854	36.50	23.4
Tula	Tùla	1,425	66.19	21.5
Uri	Uri	2,822	56.81	49.7
Usini	Ùsini	4,120	30.74	134.0
Valledoria	Codaruìna	4,321	25.95	166.5
Viddalba	Vidda 'ècchja	1,570	50.41	31.1
Villanova Monteleone	Biddanòa Monteleòne	2,039	202.68	10.1

== See also ==
- List of municipalities of Sardinia
- List of municipalities of Italy
