= Province of Sassari =

Province of Italy

Province of Sassari Provincia di Sassari (Italian) Provìntzia de Tàtari (Sardinian) Prubìnzia di Sàssari (Sassarese)
- Province (1859–2025)
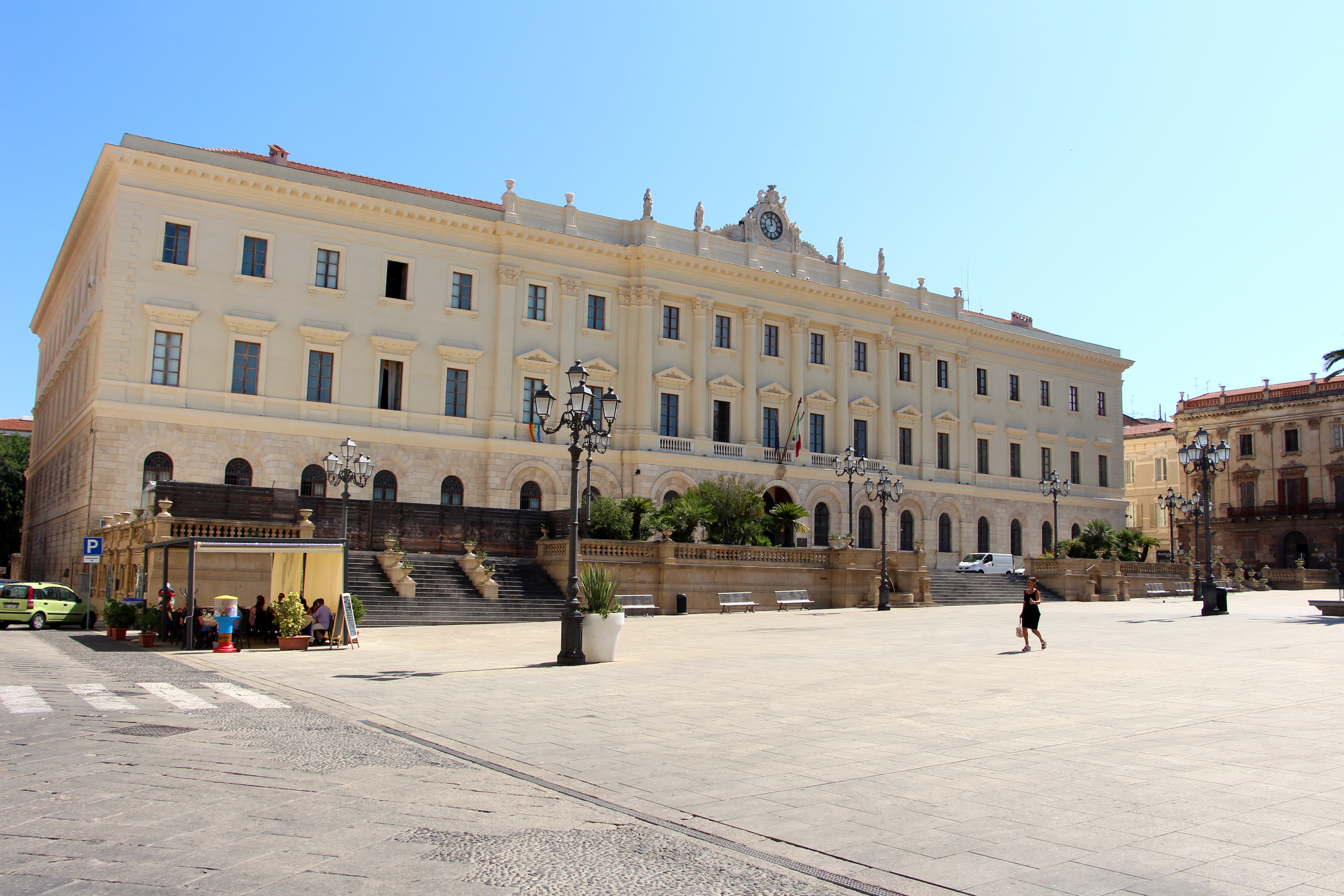
- Palazzo Sciuti, the provincial seat

- Flag Coat of arms

- Map highlighting the location of the province of Sassari in Italy
- Country: Italy
- Region: Sardinia
- Capital(s): Sassari
- Municipalities: 92

Area
  - Total: 7,692.09 km^{2} (2,969.93 sq mi)

Population (2025)
  - Total: 471,957
  - Density: 61.3561/km^{2} (158.912/sq mi)

GDP
  - Total: €6.315 billion (2015)
  - Per capita: €18,884 (2015)
- Time zone: UTC+1 (CET)
  - Summer (DST): UTC+2 (CEST)
- Postal code: 07000-07100
- Telephone prefix: 079
- Vehicle registration: SS
- ISTAT: 090

The province of Sassari (Italian: provincia di Sassari; Sardinian: provìntzia de Tàtari; Sassarese: prubìnzia di Sàssari; Algherese: província de Sàsser; Gallurese: pruvincia di Sassari) was a province in the autonomous island region of Sardinia, Italy. Its capital was the city of Sassari. On 1 April 2025, the province was disestablished in favor of the new Metropolitan City of Sassari, which corresponds to the 66 western municipalities of the province in its 2005–2015 borders; the easternmost 26 municipalities were reorganized as Province of Gallura North-East Sardinia, corresponding to the borders of the former Province of Olbia-Tempio.

The province had 471,957 inhabitants in 2025.

== History ==
In ancient times, between 1600 and 1500 BC, the Nuragic civilization was at its peak in this area. During the Roman domination, the Logudoro region was one of the main grain suppliers of the Western Roman Empire, and was the seat of several legions. In the Middle Ages, the Logudoro region was the center of one of the four quasi-kingdoms in which Sardinia was divided, the Giudicato di Torres or Logoduro, the first capital being Ardara, later replaced by Sassari. The numerous countryside Romanesque basilicas date from this period. After the conquest by the House of Aragon, Logoduro declined, but later, under the House of Savoy rule as part of the Kingdom of Sardinia, it grew in significance. In the 20th century the construction of roads and railways brought more prosperity, but at the same time destroyed the large forest heritage of the region.

The Province of Sassari was founded in 1859, even before the unification of Italy in 1861, with an area which until 1927 included the entire head of the island, making it the largest province in the country at the time. The modern University of Sassari dates to around the same time that the province was created. Since 1878 the province has been administered from the Palazzo della Provincia in Sassari.

In April 2021, Sardinian Regional Council passed Regional Law Nr. 7, under which the province's territory was reorganized: the western part of the province around Sassari became the new Metropolitan City of Sassari (Città Metropolitana di Sassari), consisting of 66 comuni, whilst the eastern 26 comuni became part of new Province of Gallura-North Eastern Sardinia (Provincia della Gallura Nord-Est Sardegna), roughly corresponding to the old Province of Olbia-Tempio. Whilst the Italian government challenged the law, thus stalling its implementation, on March 12, 2022, the Constitutional Court ruled in favor of the Autonomous Region of Sardinia. On April 13, 2023, the regional council, at the proposal of the regional government, approved an amendment to the 2021 reform, defining the timeframe and manner of its implementation, which would see its full implementation in 2024.

== Geography ==
Facing the Sardinian Sea to the north and west and the Tyrrhenian Sea to the east, the Province of Sassari is bordered to the south by the provinces of Nuoro and Oristano. It has an area of 7,692 square kilometres (2,970 mi^{2}), and a total population of 493,357 (2017). There are 92 comuni (municipalities) in the province, the largest of which are Sassari, Olbia, Alghero, Porto Torres, Tempio Pausania, Sorso, Ozieri, Ittiri and Sennori. Another town of note, Pattada, is particularly known for its handmade knives.

In the province is the only natural lake in Sardinia, Lake Baratz, and one of the largest artificial lakes, Lake Coghinas in the western part which (before the re-organization of Sardinian provinces) formed the boundary with the abolished province of Olbia-Tempio. In this territory is one of the largest plains in Sardinia, Nurra. The province contains some of the most famous resorts of Sardinia including Castelsardo, Porto Torres, Alghero, the Riviera del Corallo, Stintino and others. Stintino is located on the peninsula of the same name, running from the Nurra plain to the Asinara Island, part of the Asinara National Park. Among the notable beaches of the Province of Sassari is Balai in Porto Torres, Pelosa Beach in Stintino, and others such as Alghero il Lido, Maria Pia, Bombarde, and Mugoni. The inner part of the province in the traditional Logoduro region is characterized by a hilly and mountainous landscape, with soft volcanic terrains. The town of Ozieri is its most important center for culture and history away from the coast, noted for its production of tools and pottery from ancient times.

== Demographics ==
In 2025, the province of Sassari had a population of 471,957, of which 49.3% were male and 50.7% were female, compared to the nationwide average of 49.0% and 51.0% respectively. Minors make up 12.8% of the population, and seniors make up 26.1%, compared to the Italian average of 14.9% and 24.7% respectively.

Historical population

Year	Pop.	±%
1861	169,329	—
1871	187,511	+10.7%
1881	201,069	+7.2%
1901	238,680	+18.7%
1911	262,865	+10.1%
1921	266,155	+1.3%
1931	294,075	+10.5%
1936	305,273	+3.8%

Year	Pop.	±%
1951	353,582	+15.8%
1961	385,319	+9.0%
1971	402,152	+4.4%
1981	438,981	+9.2%
1991	461,061	+5.0%
2001	460,660	−0.1%
2011	478,544	+3.9%
2021	476,516	−0.4%

Source: ISTAT

=== Immigration ===
As of 2025, the foreign-born population is 30,925, making up 6.6% of the total population. The 5 largest foreign nationalities are Romanians (5,858), Germans (2,169), Moroccans (1,977), Senegalese (1,839) and French (1,769).

Foreign population by country of birth (2025)
Country of birth	Population
Romania	5,858
Germany	2,169
Morocco	1,977
Senegal	1,839
France	1,769
Ukraine	1,123
Argentina	1,054
Switzerland	1,014
Poland	796
Pakistan	778
China	743
Brazil	736
Bangladesh	695
Albania	625
Nigeria	621

== Municipalities ==
The province had 92 municipalities (comuni). The largest by population were Sassari with 120,510 inhabitants, Olbia with 61,681 and Alghero with 41,989.

- Aggius
- Aglientu
- Alà dei Sardi
- Alghero
- Anela
- Ardara
- Arzachena
- Badesi
- Banari
- Benetutti
- Berchidda
- Bessude
- Bonnanaro
- Bono
- Bonorva
- Bortigiadas
- Borutta
- Bottidda
- Buddusò
- Budoni
- Bultei
- Bulzi
- Burgos
- Calangianus
- Cargeghe
- Castelsardo
- Cheremule
- Chiaramonti
- Codrongianos
- Cossoine
- Erula
- Esporlatu
- Florinas
- Giave
- Golfo Aranci
- Illorai
- Ittireddu
- Ittiri
- La Maddalena
- Laerru
- Loiri Porto San Paolo
- Luogosanto
- Luras
- Mara
- Martis
- Monteleone Rocca Doria
- Monti
- Mores
- Muros
- Nughedu San Nicolò
- Nule
- Nulvi
- Olbia
- Olmedo
- Oschiri
- Osilo
- Ossi
- Ozieri
- Padria
- Padru
- Palau
- Pattada
- Perfugas
- Ploaghe
- Porto Torres
- Pozzomaggiore
- Putifigari
- Romana
- San Teodoro
- Sant'Antonio di Gallura
- Santa Maria Coghinas
- Santa Teresa Gallura
- Sassari
- Sedini
- Semestene
- Sennori
- Siligo
- Sorso
- Stintino
- Telti
- Tempio Pausania
- Tergu
- Thiesi
- Tissi
- Torralba
- Trinità d'Agultu e Vignola
- Tula
- Uri
- Usini
- Valledoria
- Viddalba
- Villanova Monteleone
