= Villanova Monteleone =

Villanova Monteleone Biddanoa Monteleone
- Comune
- Comune di Villanova Monteleone
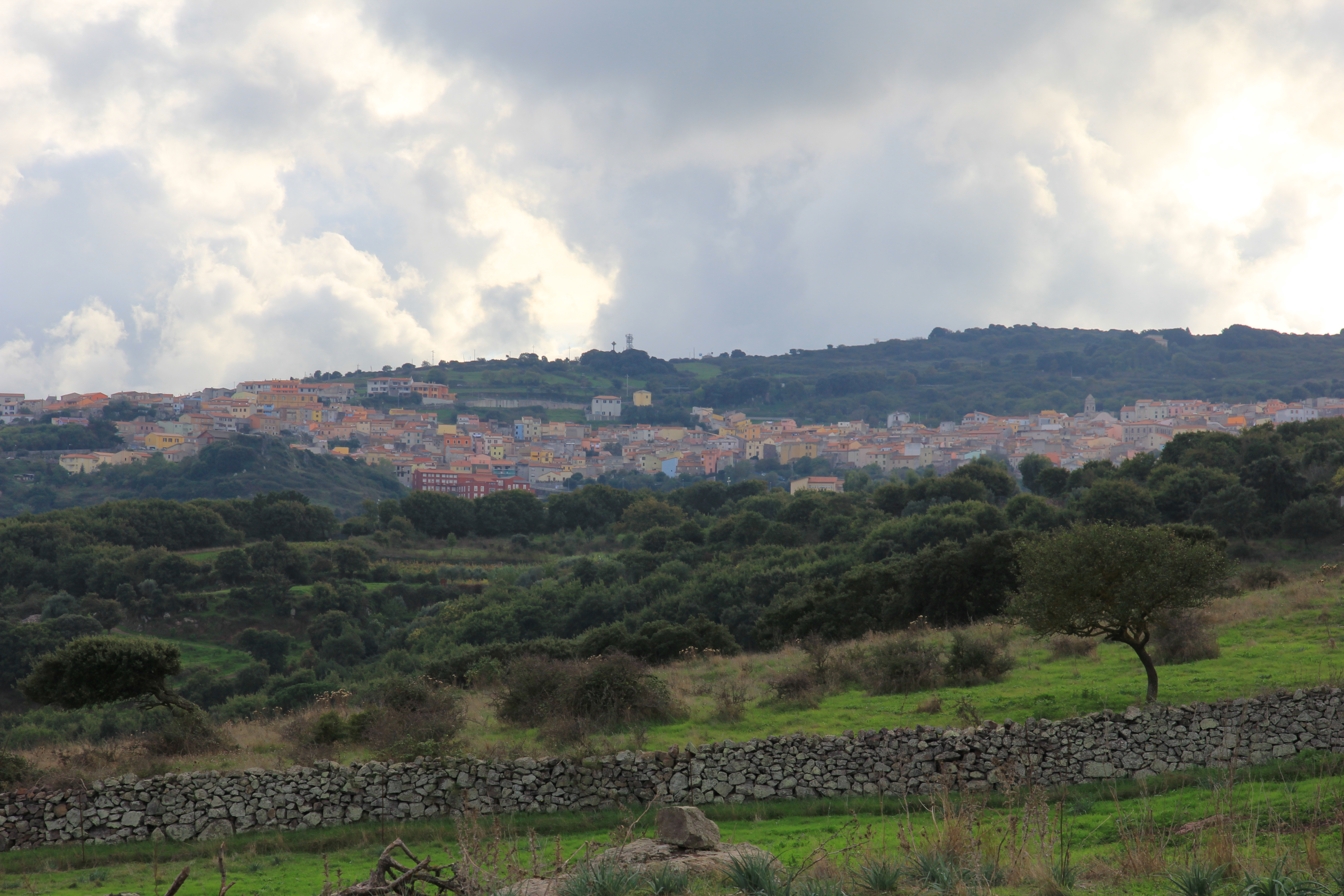

- Location within Sardinia
- Coordinates: 40°30′N 8°28′E
- Country: Italy
- Region: Sardinia
- Metropolitan city: Sassari (SS)

Area
  - Total: 202.2 km^{2} (78.1 sq mi)

Population (Dec. 2004)
  - Total: 2,528
  - Density: 12.50/km^{2} (32.38/sq mi)
- Demonym: Villanovesi
- Time zone: UTC+1 (CET)
  - Summer (DST): UTC+2 (CEST)
- Postal code: 07019;
- Dialing code: 079

Villanova Monteleone (Sardinian: Biddanòa) is a comune (municipality) in the Metropolitan City of Sassari in the Italian region Sardinia, located about 150 kilometres (93 mi) northwest of Cagliari and about 25 kilometres (16 mi) southwest of Sassari. As of 31 December 2004, it had a population of 2,528 and an area of 202.2 square kilometres (78.1 mi^{2}).

Villanova Monteleone borders the following municipalities: Alghero, Bosa, Ittiri, Monteleone Rocca Doria, Montresta, Padria, Putifigari, Romana, Thiesi.

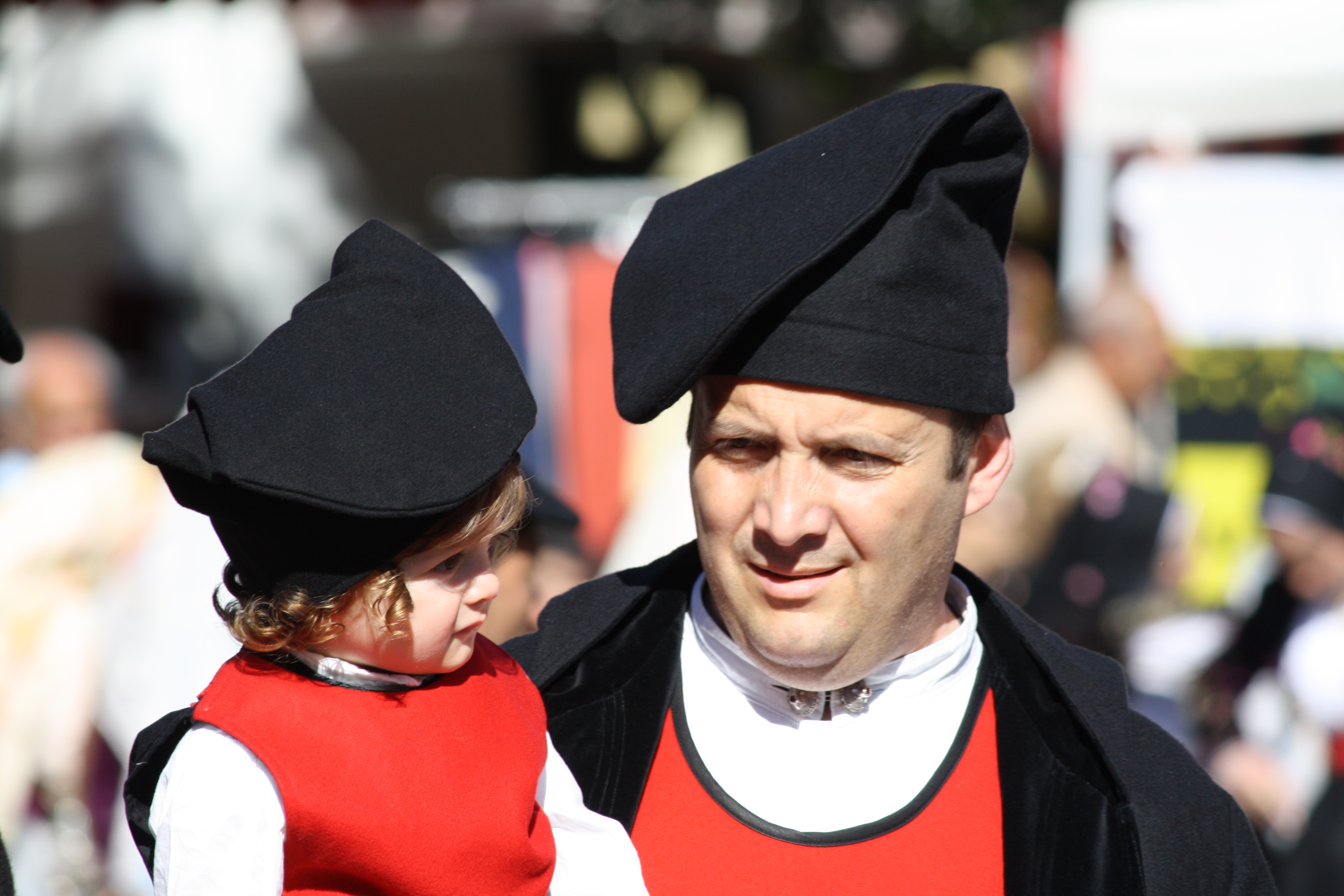
Traditional costumes from Villanova

== Demographic evolution ==
Historical population

Year	Pop.	±%
1861	3,985	—
1871	4,191	+5.2%
1881	4,446	+6.1%
1901	5,255	+18.2%
1911	5,594	+6.5%

Year	Pop.	±%
1921	4,764	−14.8%
1931	5,016	+5.3%
1936	4,892	−2.5%
1951	5,055	+3.3%
1961	4,583	−9.3%

Year	Pop.	±%
1971	3,733	−18.5%
1981	3,031	−18.8%
1991	2,774	−8.5%
2001	2,588	−6.7%

Source: Data from ISTAT
