= Bessude =

- Comune
- Comune di Bessude
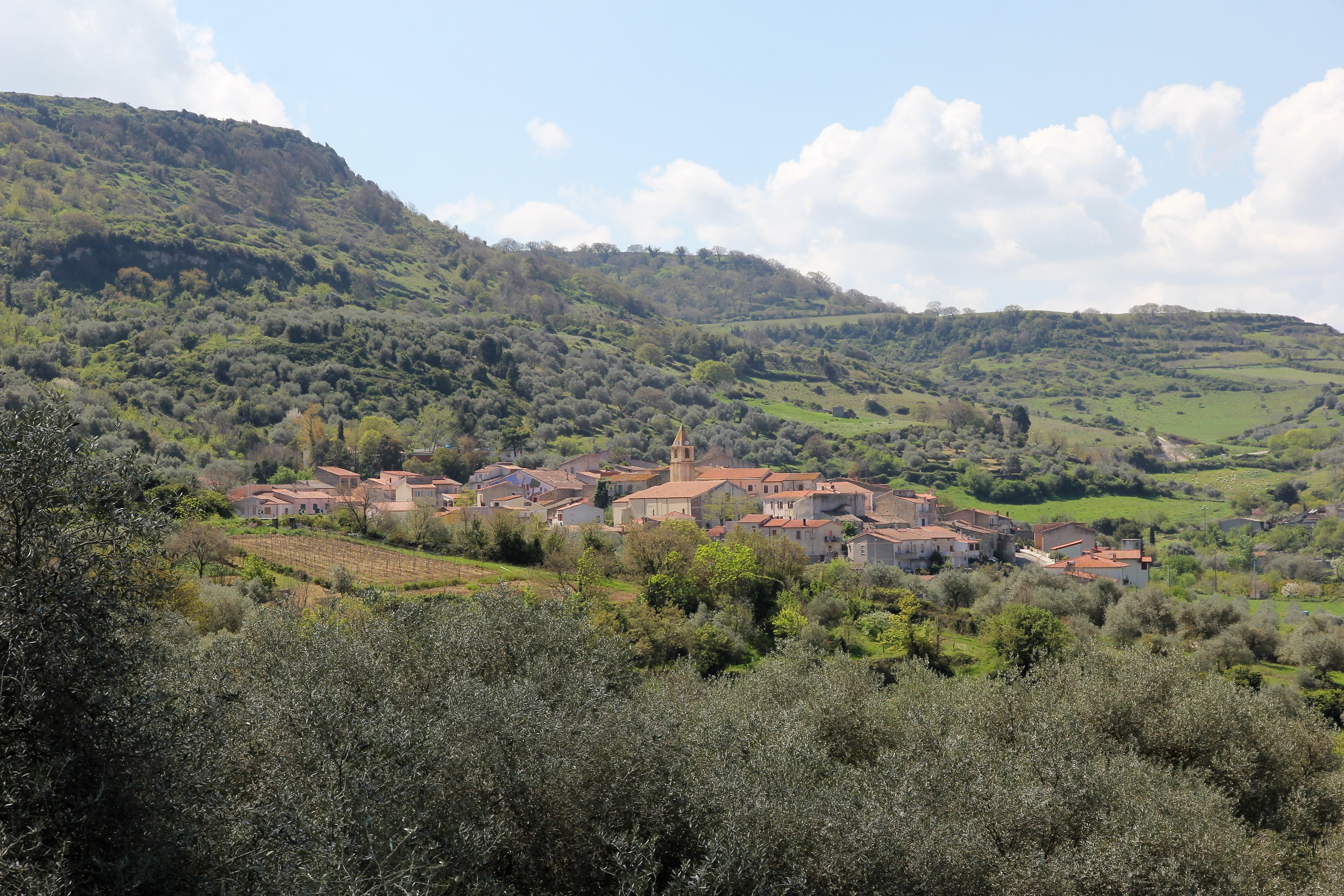
- View of Bessude

- Location within Sardinia
- Coordinates: 40°33′N 8°44′E
- Country: Italy
- Region: Sardinia
- Metropolitan city: Sassari (SS)

Government
  - Mayor: Roberto Marras

Area
  - Total: 26.79 km^{2} (10.34 sq mi)
- Elevation: 447 m (1,467 ft)

Population (2026)
  - Total: 369
  - Density: 13.8/km^{2} (35.7/sq mi)
- Demonym: Bessudesi
- Time zone: UTC+1 (CET)
  - Summer (DST): UTC+2 (CEST)
- Postal code: 07040
- Dialing code: 079
- Website: Official website

Bessude is a village and comune (municipality) in the Metropolitan City of Sassari in the autonomous island region of Sardinia in Italy, located about 150 kilometres (93 mi) north of Cagliari and about 25 kilometres (16 mi) southeast of Sassari. It has 369 inhabitants.

Bessude borders the municipalities of Banari, Bonnanaro, Borutta, Ittiri, Siligo, and Thiesi.

== Demographics ==
As of 2026, the population is 369, of which 48.2% are male, and 51.8% are female. Minors make up 7.9% of the population, and seniors make up 39.8%.

Historical population

Year	Pop.	±%
1861	699	—
1871	724	+3.6%
1881	700	−3.3%
1901	763	+9.0%
1911	810	+6.2%
1921	801	−1.1%
1931	790	−1.4%
1936	696	−11.9%

Year	Pop.	±%
1951	750	+7.8%
1961	704	−6.1%
1971	546	−22.4%
1981	547	+0.2%
1991	509	−6.9%
2001	501	−1.6%
2011	428	−14.6%
2021	391	−8.6%

Source: ISTAT

=== Immigration ===
As of 2025, immigrants make up 5.4% of the population. The 5 largest foreign countries of birth are Morocco, the Dominican Republic, Switzerland, Australia, and Romania.
