= Cheremule =

Cheremule Cherèmule (Sardinian)
- Comune
- Comune di Cheremule
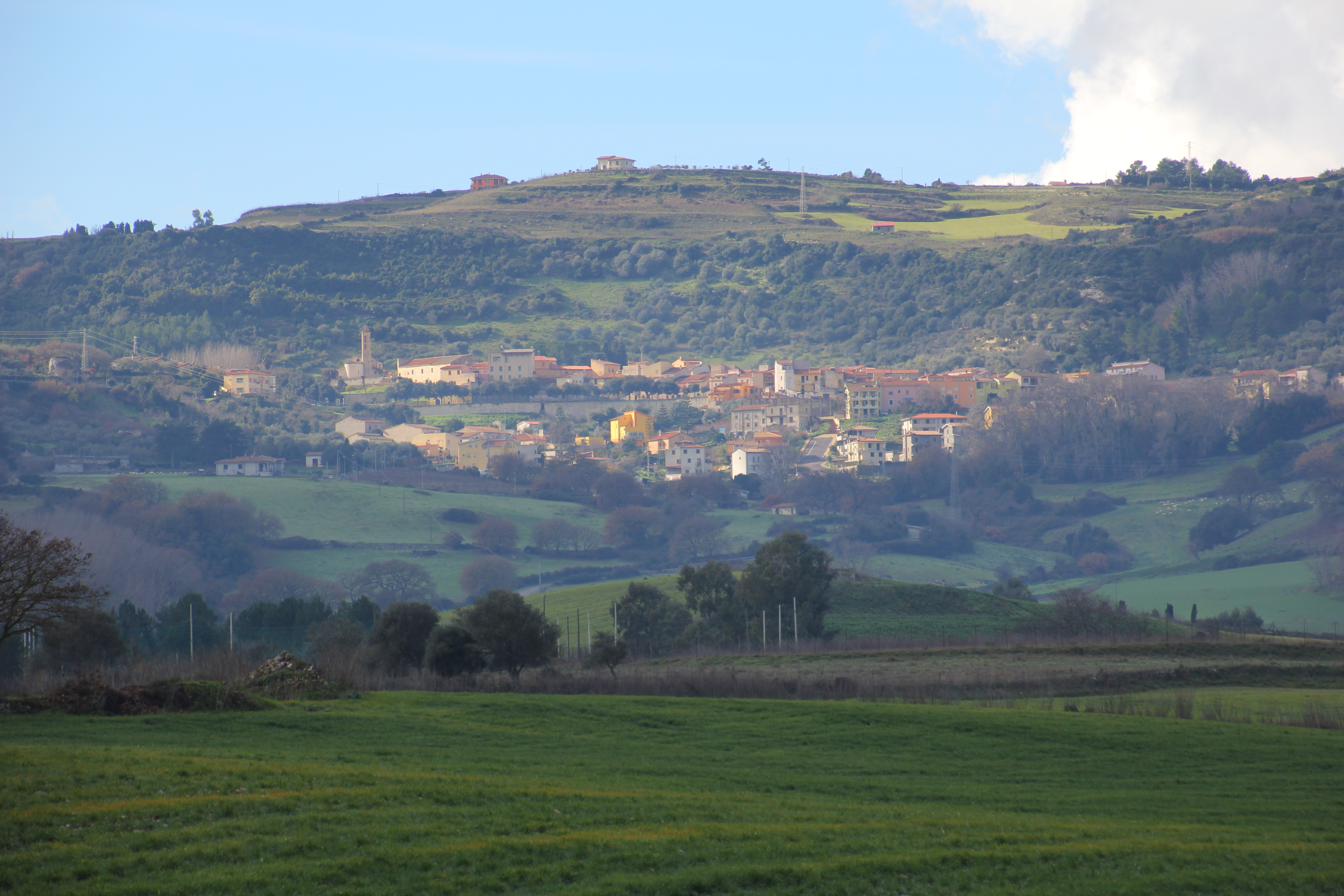
- View of Cheremule

- Location within Sardinia
- Coordinates: 40°30′N 8°44′E
- Country: Italy
- Region: Sardinia
- Metropolitan city: Sassari (SS)

Government
  - Mayor: Antonella Chessa

Area
  - Total: 24.25 km^{2} (9.36 sq mi)
- Elevation: 540 m (1,770 ft)

Population (2026)
  - Total: 378
  - Density: 15.6/km^{2} (40.4/sq mi)
- Demonym: Cheremulesi
- Time zone: UTC+1 (CET)
  - Summer (DST): UTC+2 (CEST)
- Postal code: 07040
- Dialing code: 079
- Website: Official website

Cheremule (Sardinian: Cherèmule) is a village and comune (municipality) in the Metropolitan City of Sassari in the autonomous island region of Sardinia in Italy, located about 150 kilometres (93 mi) north of Cagliari and about 30 kilometres (19 mi) southeast of Sassari. It has 378 inhabitants.

Cheremule borders the municipalities of Borutta, Cossoine, Giave, Thiesi, and Torralba.

== Demographics ==
As of 2026, the population is 378, of which 51.6% are male, and 48.4% are female. Minors make up 10.1% of the population, and seniors make up 36.8%.

Historical population

Year	Pop.	±%
1861	844	—
1871	810	−4.0%
1881	814	+0.5%
1901	817	+0.4%
1911	1,016	+24.4%
1921	1,001	−1.5%
1931	878	−12.3%
1936	922	+5.0%

Year	Pop.	±%
1951	849	−7.9%
1961	752	−11.4%
1971	596	−20.7%
1981	580	−2.7%
1991	558	−3.8%
2001	527	−5.6%
2011	455	−13.7%
2021	402	−11.6%

Source: ISTAT

=== Immigration ===
As of 2025, immigrants make up 7.5% of the population. The 5 largest foreign countries of birth are Germany, Romania, Morocco, Switzerland, and Argentina.

== Sights ==
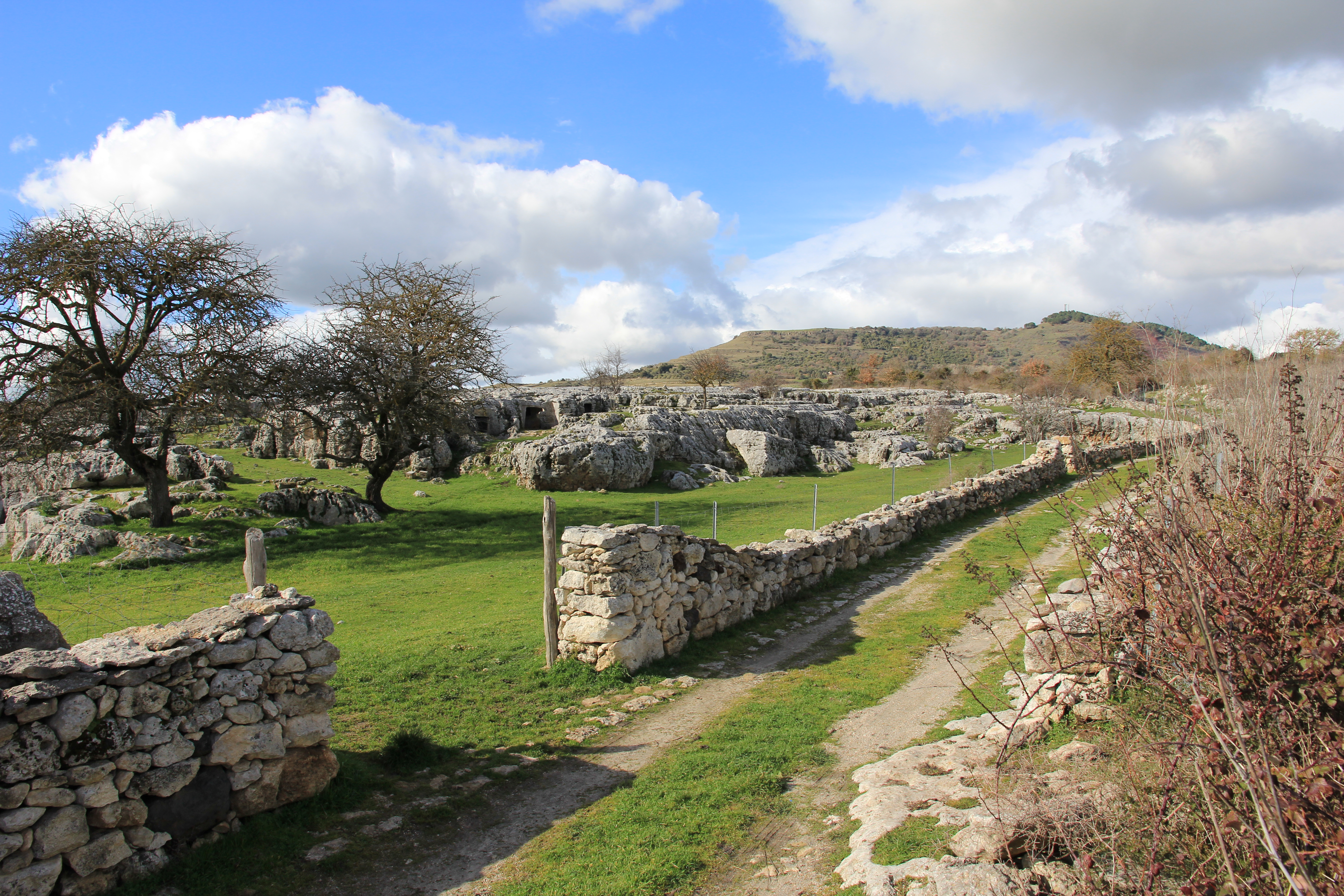
Moseddu necropolis

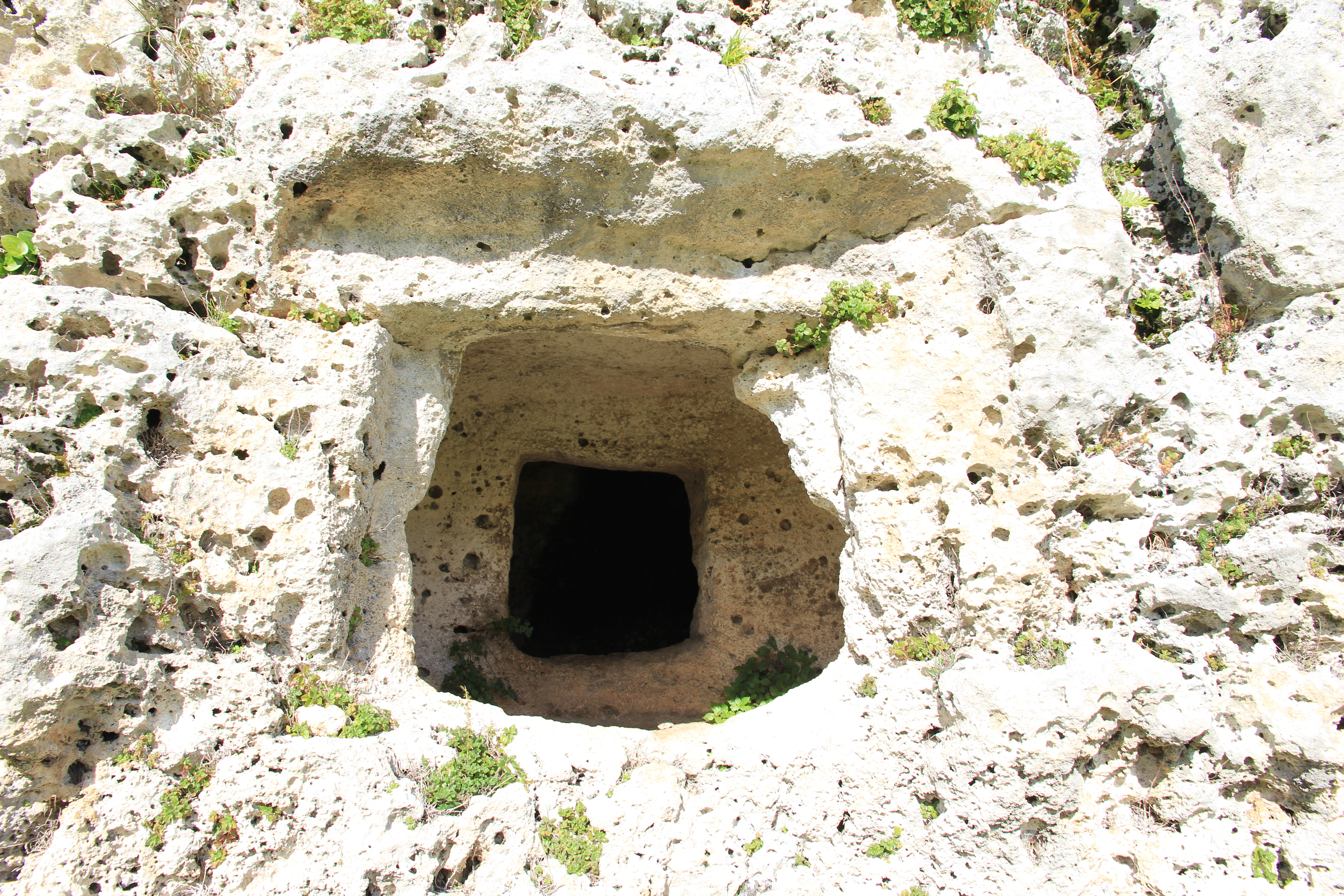
Moseddu necropolis

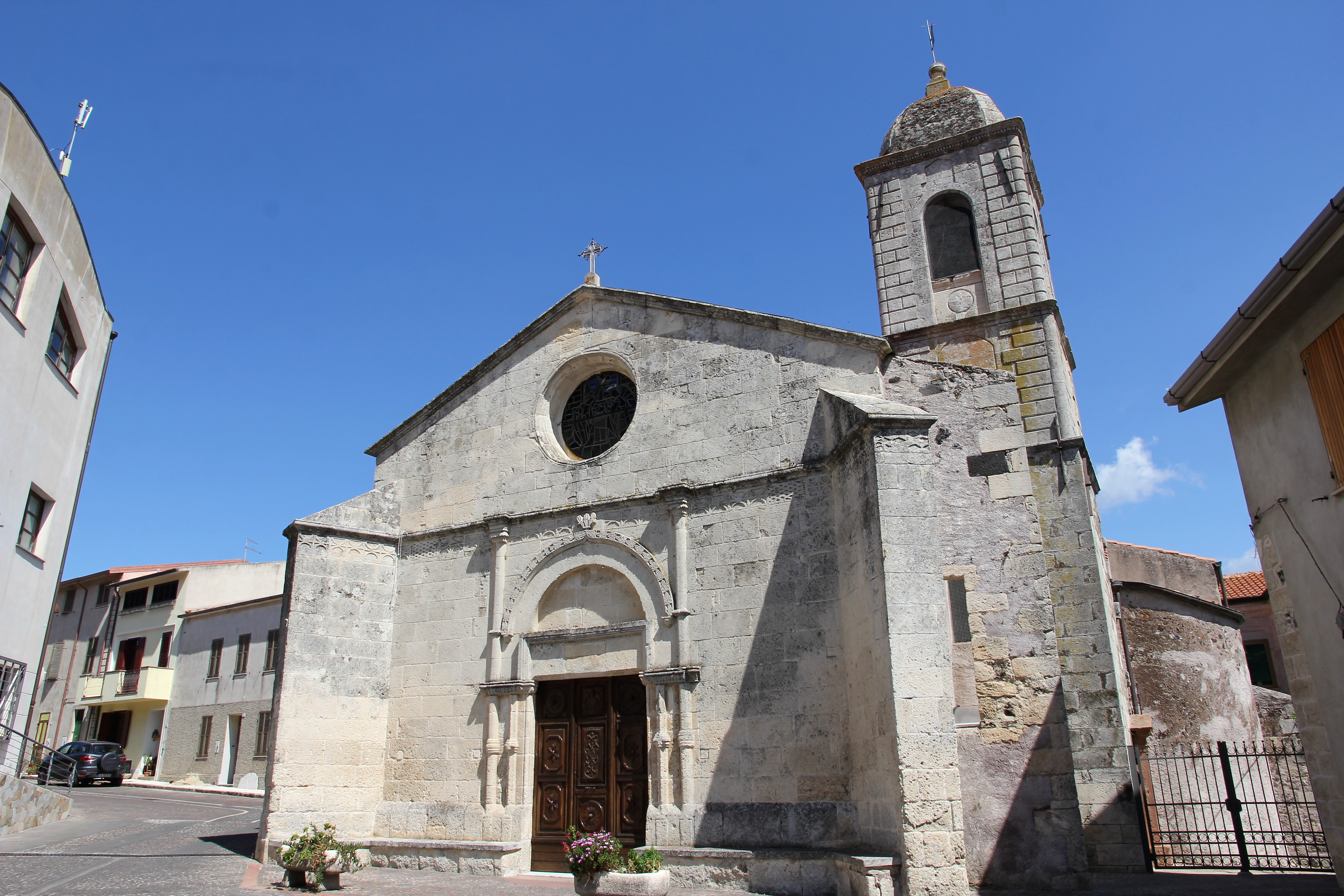
Church of San Gabriele
