= Giave =

- Comune
- Comune di Giave
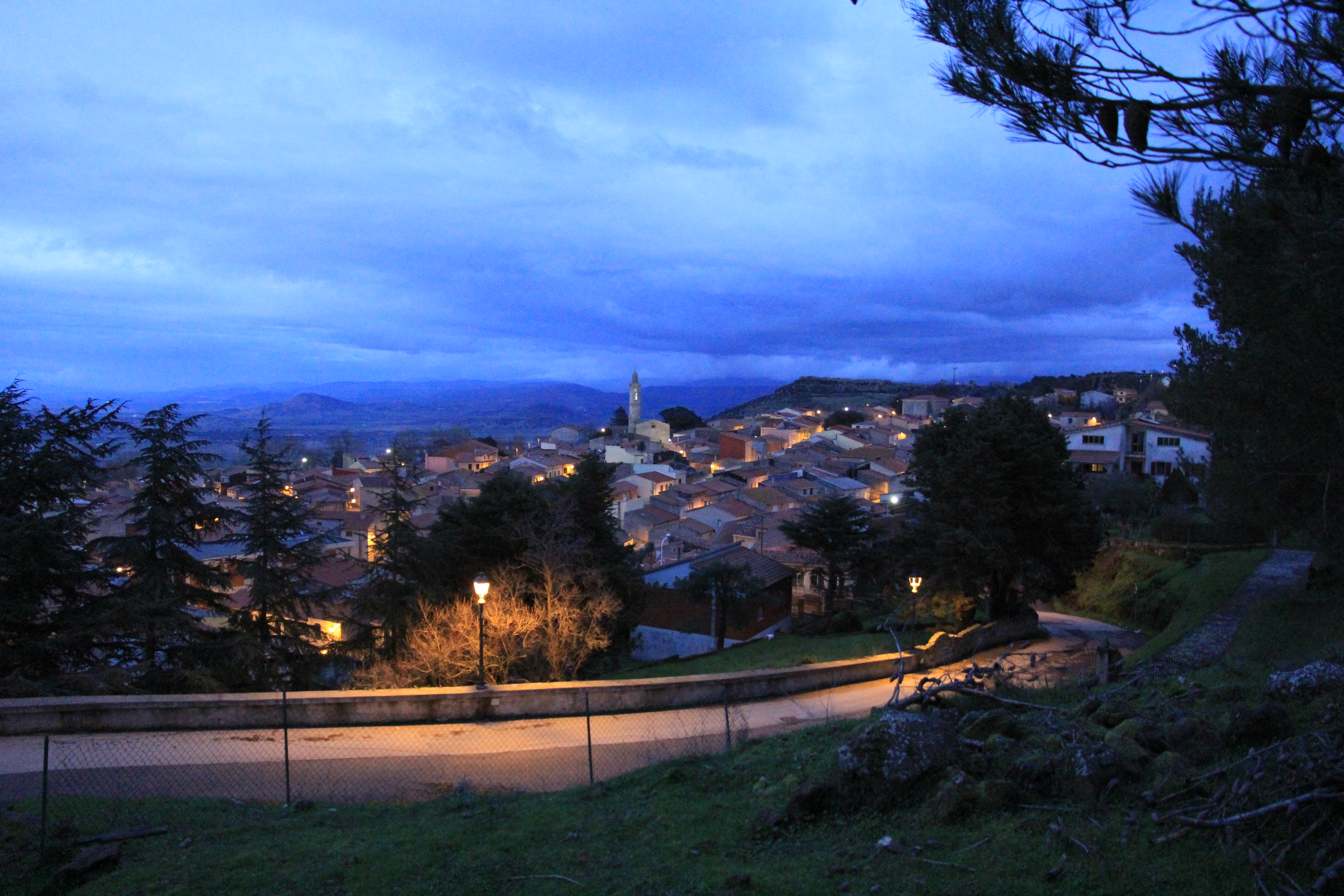
- View of Giave

- Location within Sardinia
- Coordinates: 40°27′N 8°45′E
- Country: Italy
- Region: Sardinia
- Metropolitan city: Sassari (SS)

Area
  - Total: 47.07 km^{2} (18.17 sq mi)
- Elevation: 592 m (1,942 ft)

Population (2026)
  - Total: 471
  - Density: 10.0/km^{2} (25.9/sq mi)
- Time zone: UTC+1 (CET)
  - Summer (DST): UTC+2 (CEST)
- Postal code: 07010
- Dialing code: 079

Giave is a village and comune (municipality) in the Metropolitan City of Sassari in the autonomous island region of Sardinia in Italy, located about 140 kilometres (87 mi) north of Cagliari and about 35 kilometres (22 mi) southeast of Sassari. It has 471 inhabitants.

Giave borders the municipalities of Bonorva, Cheremule, Cossoine, Thiesi, and Torralba.

== Demographics ==
As of 2026, the population is 471, of which 51.2% are male, and 48.8% are female. Minors make up 10.8% of the population, and seniors make up 35.0%.

Historical population

Year	Pop.	±%
1861	1,667	—
1871	1,859	+11.5%
1881	1,830	−1.6%
1901	1,895	+3.6%
1911	2,041	+7.7%
1921	1,829	−10.4%
1931	1,838	+0.5%
1936	1,757	−4.4%

Year	Pop.	±%
1951	1,694	−3.6%
1961	1,397	−17.5%
1971	1,044	−25.3%
1981	845	−19.1%
1991	758	−10.3%
2001	692	−8.7%
2011	586	−15.3%
2021	494	−15.7%

Source: ISTAT

=== Immigration ===
As of 2025, immigrants make up 5.8% of the population. The 5 largest foreign countries of birth are Romania, Chile, Morocco, Germany, and Senegal.
