= Romana, Sardinia =

Romana Rumana (Sardinian)
- Comune
- Comune di Romana
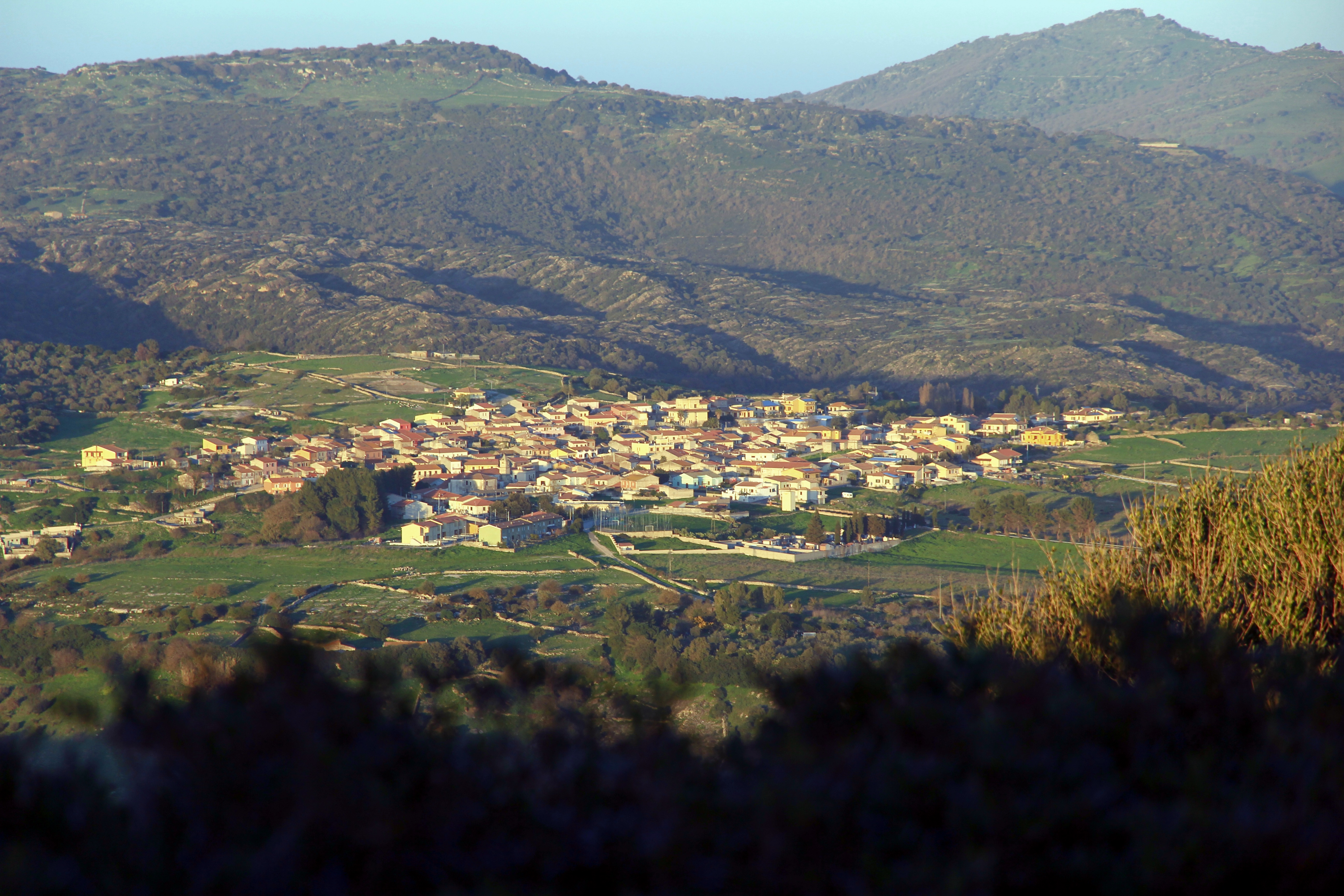
- View of Romana

- Location within Sardinia
- Coordinates: 40°29′N 8°35′E
- Country: Italy
- Region: Sardinia
- Metropolitan city: Sassari (SS)

Area
  - Total: 21.60 km^{2} (8.34 sq mi)

Population (2026)
  - Total: 457
  - Density: 21.2/km^{2} (54.8/sq mi)
- Time zone: UTC+1 (CET)
  - Summer (DST): UTC+2 (CEST)
- Postal code: 07010
- Dialing code: 079

Romana (Sardinian: Rumana) is a village and comune (municipality) in the Metropolitan City of Sassari in the autonomous island region of Sardinia in Italy, located about 150 kilometres (93 mi) northwest of Cagliari and about 30 kilometres (19 mi) south of Sassari. It has 457 inhabitants.

Romana borders the municipalities of Cossoine, Monteleone Rocca Doria, Padria, Thiesi, and Villanova Monteleone.

== Demographics ==
As of 2026, the population is 457, of which 47.5% are males, and 52.5% are females. Minors make up 8.5% of the population, and seniors make up 35.9%.

Historical population

Year	Pop.	±%
1861	683	—
1871	710	+4.0%
1881	751	+5.8%
1901	901	+20.0%
1911	886	−1.7%
1921	848	−4.3%
1931	848	+0.0%
1936	842	−0.7%

Year	Pop.	±%
1951	965	+14.6%
1961	997	+3.3%
1971	778	−22.0%
1981	729	−6.3%
1991	686	−5.9%
2001	619	−9.8%
2011	578	−6.6%
2021	497	−14.0%

Source: ISTAT

=== Immigration ===
As of 2025, immigrants make up 5.7% of the population. The 5 largest foreign countries of birth are Morocco, Germany, the Netherlands, Spain, and Poland.
