= Metropolitan City of Sassari =

Metropolitan City of Sassari Città metropolitana di Sassari (Italian) Tzitade metropolitana de Tàtari (Logudorese) Ziddai metroporitana di Sàssari (Sassarese) Ciutat metropolitana de Sàsser (Catalan) Cità metrupulitana di Sassari (Gallurese)
- Metropolitan City
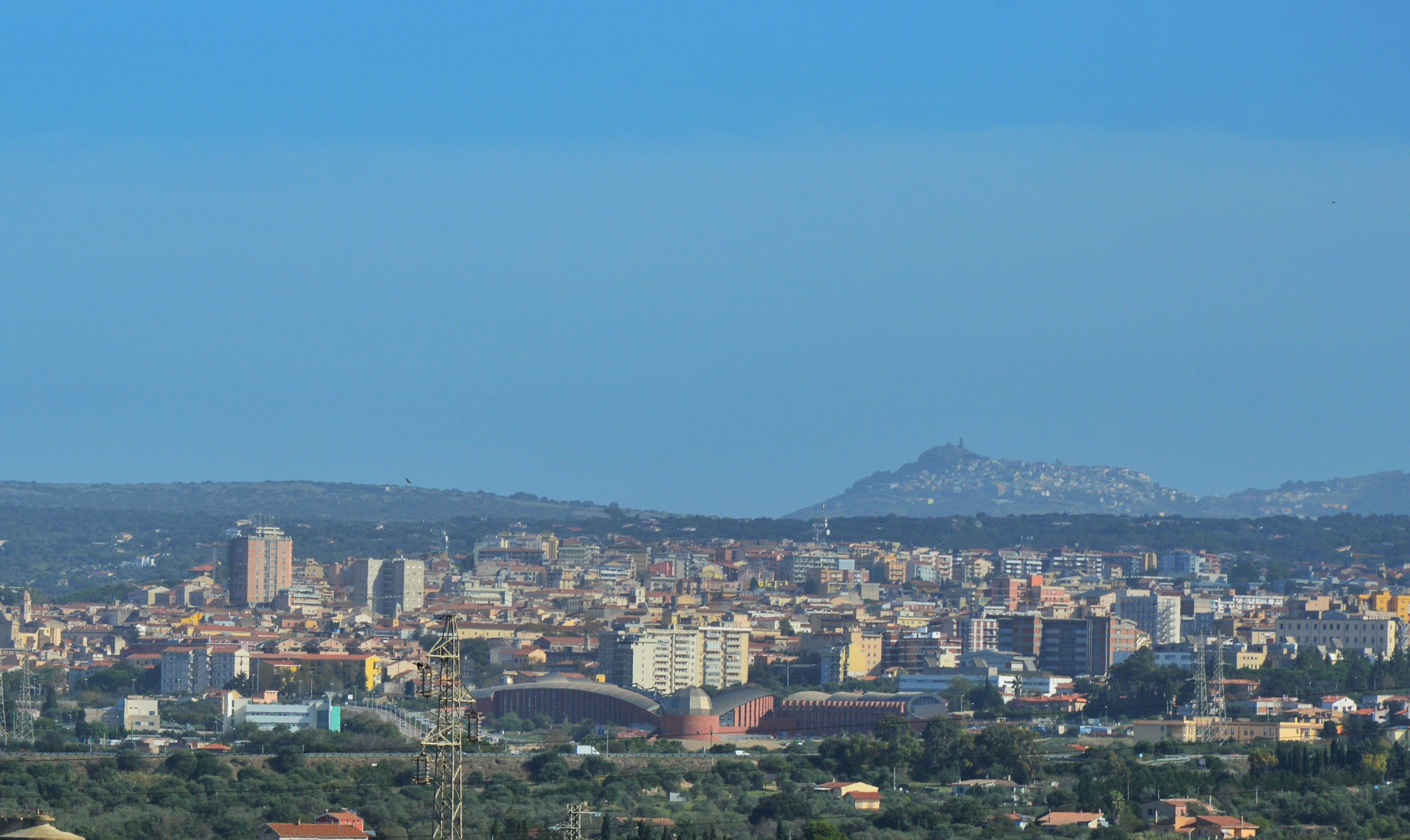
- View of Sassari

- Flag Coat of arms

- Location of the Metropolitan City of Sassari in Italy
- Country: Italy
- Region: Sardinia
- Established: 16 April 2021
- Activated: 1 April 2025
- Capital(s): Sassari
- Municipalities: 66

Government
  - Metropolitan mayor: Giuseppe Mascia

Area
  - Total: 4,285.91 km^{2} (1,654.80 sq mi)

Population (2026)
  - Total: 311,128
  - Density: 72.5932/km^{2} (188.016/sq mi)
- Time zone: UTC+1 (CET)
  - Summer (DST): UTC+2 (CEST)
- Vehicle registration: SS
- ISTAT code: 312
- Website: www.cittametropolitana.ss.it/it

The Metropolitan City of Sassari (Note: Italian: città metropolitana di Sassari; Logudorese: tzitade metropolitana de Tàtari; Sassarese: ziddai metroporitana di Sàssari; Algherese: ciutat metropolitana de Sàsser; Gallurese: cità metrupulitana di Sassari.) is a metropolitan city in the autonomous island region of Sardinia (Italy). Its capital is Sassari, the second-largest city in Sardinia.

The Metropolitan City was carved out from the former Province of Sassari on April 16, 2021 and became functional on April 1, 2025. It has 311,128 inhabitants across its 66 municipalities.

== History ==
The Province of Sassari absorbed the province of Olbia-Tempio by a regional decree in 2016.

On April 16, 2021, under Sardinian Regional Council's Regional Law Nr. 7, the Province was restored as the Metropolitan City of Sassari, becoming the country's newest metropolitan city. The province became fully functional on April 1, 2025.

== Geography ==
Facing the Sardinian Sea to the west and north, the province is bordered by the province of Oristano to the east, the province of Nuoro to the southeast and the province of Gallura North-East Sardinia to the east. It has an area of 4,285.91 square kilometres (1,654.80 mi^{2}).

The province includes the Sardinian historical regions of Goceano, Meilogu, Nurra, Romangia and Sassarese, as well as parts of Anglona and Monteacuto.

=== Climate ===
Climate data for Sassari, Sardinia
Month	Jan	Feb	Mar	Apr	May	Jun	Jul	Aug	Sep	Oct	Nov	Dec	Year
Mean daily maximum °C (°F)	12.2 (54.0)	12.5 (54.5)	14.0 (57.2)	16.3 (61.3)	20.1 (68.2)	24.0 (75.2)	27.7 (81.9)	27.8 (82.0)	24.8 (76.6)	20.7 (69.3)	16.2 (61.2)	13.1 (55.6)	19.1 (66.4)
Mean daily minimum °C (°F)	6.0 (42.8)	6.1 (43.0)	7.0 (44.6)	8.8 (47.8)	11.9 (53.4)	15.4 (59.7)	18.5 (65.3)	18.9 (66.0)	16.6 (61.9)	13.5 (56.3)	9.8 (49.6)	7.0 (44.6)	11.6 (52.9)
Average precipitation mm (inches)	75 (3.0)	76 (3.0)	68 (2.7)	65 (2.6)	42 (1.7)	20 (0.8)	0 (0)	17 (0.7)	54 (2.1)	98 (3.9)	96 (3.8)	85 (3.3)	696 (27.6)
Average precipitation days	7	7	7	6	4	2	0	1	4	6	8	8	60
Mean monthly sunshine hours	127	152	186	223	270	310	350	316	257	202	143	115	2,651
Source: globopix

== Government ==
The Metropolitan mayor is by right the mayor of the administrative capital city. The first extraordinary administrator (amministratore straordinario) of the metropolitan city was Gavino Arru, appointed by resolution 36/2 of September 19, 2024 of the Autonomous Region of Sardinia. The inaugural mayor of the metropolitan city has been Giuseppe Mascia, holding the office since September 2025.

=== List of metropolitan mayors ===
No.	Metropolitan mayor	Term start	Term end	Party
–	Gavino Arru (Special administrator)	1 April 2025	30 September 2025	–
1	Giuseppe Mascia	30 September 2025	Incumbent	PD

=== Municipalities ===
The province has 66 municipalities:

- Alghero
- Anela
- Ardara
- Banari
- Benetutti
- Bessude
- Bonnanaro
- Bono
- Bonorva
- Borutta
- Bottidda
- Bultei
- Bulzi
- Burgos
- Cargeghe
- Castelsardo
- Cheremule
- Chiaramonti
- Codrongianos
- Cossoine
- Erula
- Esporlatu
- Florinas
- Giave
- Illorai
- Ittireddu
- Ittiri
- Laerru
- Mara
- Martis
- Monteleone Rocca Doria
- Mores
- Muros
- Nughedu San Nicolò
- Nule
- Nulvi
- Olmedo
- Osilo
- Ossi
- Ozieri
- Padria
- Pattada
- Perfugas
- Ploaghe
- Porto Torres
- Pozzomaggiore
- Putifigari
- Romana
- Santa Maria Coghinas
- Sassari
- Sedini
- Semestene
- Sennori
- Siligo
- Sorso
- Stintino
- Tergu
- Thiesi
- Tissi
- Torralba
- Tula
- Uri
- Usini
- Valledoria
- Viddalba
- Villanova Monteleone

== Demographics ==
As of 2026, the population is 311,128, of which 49.1% are male, and 50.9% are female. Minors make up 12.0% of the population, and seniors make up 27.9%.

Historical population

Year	Pop.	±%
1861	136,355	—
1871	153,389	+12.5%
1881	162,633	+6.0%
1901	184,335	+13.3%
1911	200,882	+9.0%
1921	199,546	−0.7%
1931	217,574	+9.0%
1936	226,743	+4.2%

Year	Pop.	±%
1951	263,385	+16.2%
1961	287,459	+9.1%
1971	299,394	+4.2%
1981	321,927	+7.5%
1991	329,327	+2.3%
2001	322,326	−2.1%
2011	328,043	+1.8%
2021	318,295	−3.0%

Source: ISTAT

=== Immigration ===
As of 2025, the foreign-born population is 15,122, making up 4.8% of the total population.
