= Uri, Sardinia =

Uri
- Comune
- Comune di Uri
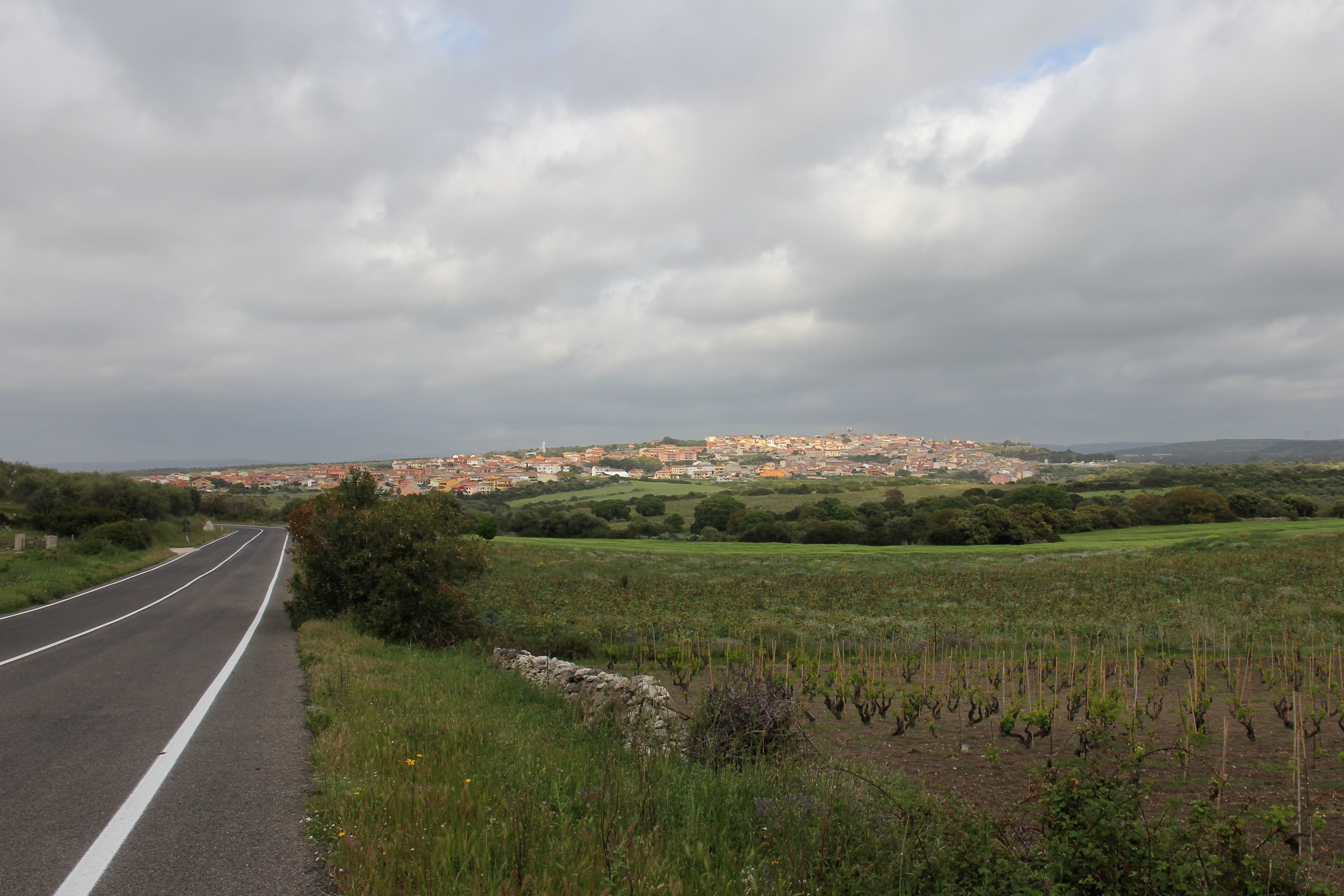

- Location within Sardinia
- Coordinates: 40°38′N 8°30′E
- Country: Italy
- Region: Sardinia
- Metropolitan city: Sassari (SS)

Government
  - Mayor: Lucia Cirroni

Area
  - Total: 56.7 km^{2} (21.9 sq mi)
- Elevation: 150 m (490 ft)

Population (Dec. 2004)
  - Total: 3,040
  - Density: 53.6/km^{2} (139/sq mi)
- Demonym: Uresi
- Time zone: UTC+1 (CET)
  - Summer (DST): UTC+2 (CEST)
- Postal code: 07040
- Dialing code: +390794198700
- Patron saint: Ns di Paulis
- Website: Official website

Uri is a comune (municipality) in the Metropolitan City of Sassari in the Italian region Sardinia, located about 18 kilometres (11 mi) from Alghero (airport) and about 12 kilometres (7 mi) northwest of Sassari and about 170 kilometres (110 mi) from Cagliari (airport). It is known for its artichoke festival, held annually in March. As of 31 December 2004, it had a population of 3,040 and an area of 56.7 square kilometres (21.9 mi^{2}).

== Geography ==
Uri borders the following municipalities: Alghero, Ittiri, Olmedo, Putifigari, Sassari, Usini.

== History ==
The earliest traces of human settlements in the Uri area, the so-called Domus de janas, date back to the 3rd millennium BC. The area, was also colonized by the Romans. After the fall of the Western Roman Empire, Sardinia was held first by the Vandals and then by the Byzantines. According to the letters of Pope Gregory I, a Romanized and Christianized culture co-existed with several Pagan cultures.

== Demographic evolution ==
Historical population

Year	Pop.	±%
1861	1,155	—
1871	1,214	+5.1%
1881	1,134	−6.6%
1901	1,264	+11.5%
1911	1,405	+11.2%

Year	Pop.	±%
1921	1,436	+2.2%
1931	1,672	+16.4%
1936	1,759	+5.2%
1951	2,111	+20.0%
1961	2,405	+13.9%

Year	Pop.	±%
1971	2,618	+8.9%
1981	2,721	+3.9%
1991	2,961	+8.8%
2001	3,050	+3.0%

Source: Data from ISTAT

== Churches and archaeological site ==
- Nostra Signora della Pazienza Church XVI sc.
- Santa Croce Church XII sc.
- St.Catherine archaeological site
- Paulis abbey ruins XI sc.
- San Leonardo Church, XI sc.
- Santu Pedru Necropolis

== Transportation ==
The nearest airport is Alghero-Fertilia International Airport, 25 kilometres (16 mi) from the city.

The closest seaport is at Porto Torres, 28 kilometres (17 mi) away.

Uri is linked to Alghero by freeway SS127bis, to Sassari by the freeway Sp15m.

== See also ==
- Diocese of Alghero-Bosa
- Fertilia Airport
- History of Sardinia
- Alghero
