= Cossoine =

- Comune
- Comune di Cossoine
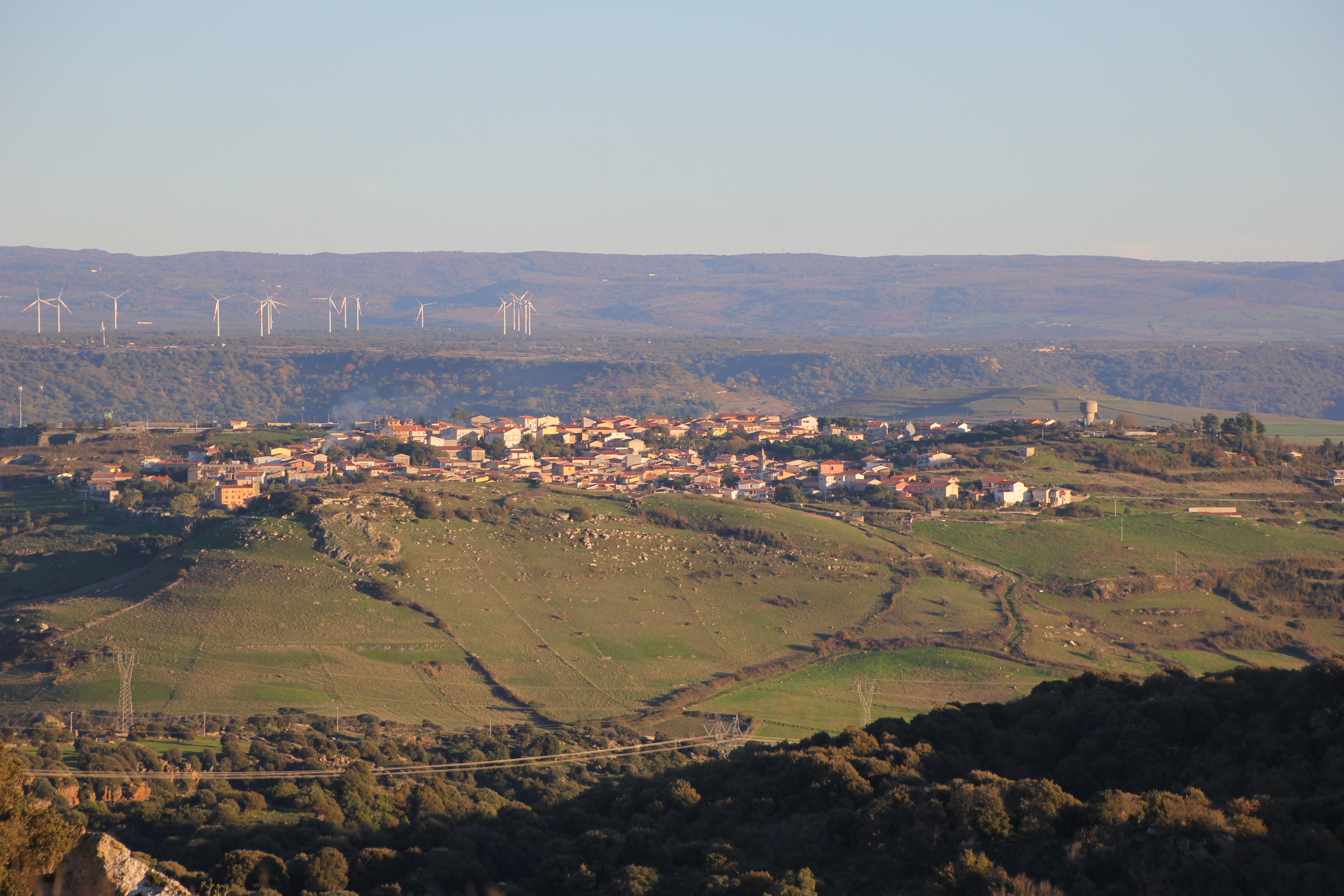
- View of Cossoine

- Location within Sardinia
- Coordinates: 40°26′N 8°43′E
- Country: Italy
- Region: Sardinia
- Metropolitan city: Sassari (SS)

Government
  - Mayor: Sabrina Sassu

Area
  - Total: 39.17 km^{2} (15.12 sq mi)
- Elevation: 529 m (1,736 ft)

Population (2026)
  - Total: 739
  - Density: 18.9/km^{2} (48.9/sq mi)
- Demonym: Cossoinesi
- Time zone: UTC+1 (CET)
  - Summer (DST): UTC+2 (CEST)
- Postal code: 07010
- Dialing code: 079
- Website: Official website

Cossoine is a village and comune (municipality) in the Metropolitan City of Sassari in the autonomous island region of Sardinia in Italy, located about 140 kilometres (87 mi) north of Cagliari and about 35 kilometres (22 mi) southeast of Sassari. It has 739 inhabitants.

Sights include the churches of Santa Maria Iscalas, an example of Byzantine architecture (6th-11th centuries), and Santa Chiara, in Romanesque-Gothic-Aragonese style (16th century).

Cossoine borders the municipalities of Bonorva, Cheremule, Giave, Mara, Padria, Pozzomaggiore, Romana, Semestene, and Thiesi.

== Demographics ==
As of 2026, the population is 739, of which 48.8% are male, and 51.2% are female. Minors make up 9.6% of the population, and seniors make up 37.3%.

Historical population

Year	Pop.	±%
1861	1,424	—
1871	1,575	+10.6%
1881	1,602	+1.7%
1901	1,726	+7.7%
1911	1,842	+6.7%
1921	1,712	−7.1%
1931	1,654	−3.4%
1936	1,662	+0.5%

Year	Pop.	±%
1951	1,789	+7.6%
1961	1,593	−11.0%
1971	1,231	−22.7%
1981	1,177	−4.4%
1991	1,077	−8.5%
2001	982	−8.8%
2011	900	−8.4%
2021	765	−15.0%

Source: ISTAT

=== Immigration ===
As of 2025, immigrants make up 11.6% of the population. The 5 largest foreign countries of birth are Romania, Argentina, Germany, Morocco, and Russia.
