= Tissi =

- Comune
- Comune di Tissi
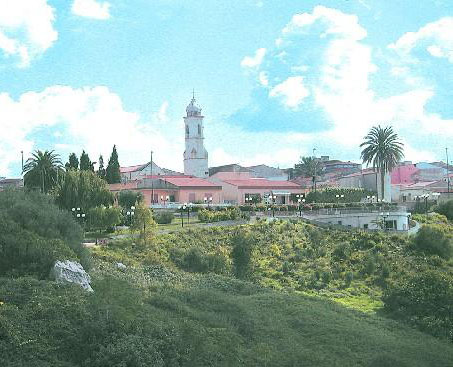

- Location within Sardinia
- Coordinates: 40°41′N 8°34′E
- Country: Italy
- Region: Sardinia
- Metropolitan city: Sassari (SS)

Area
  - Total: 10.3 km^{2} (4.0 sq mi)
- Elevation: 250 m (820 ft)

Population (Dec. 2004)
  - Total: 2,017
  - Density: 196/km^{2} (507/sq mi)
- Demonym: Tissesi
- Time zone: UTC+1 (CET)
  - Summer (DST): UTC+2 (CEST)
- Postal code: 07040
- Dialing code: 079
- Website: Official website

Tissi is a comune (municipality) in the Metropolitan City of Sassari in the Italian region Sardinia, located about 170 kilometres (110 mi) northwest of Cagliari and about 6 kilometres (4 mi) south of Sassari. As of 31 December 2004, it had a population of 2,017 and an area of 10.3 square kilometres (4.0 mi^{2}).

Tissi borders the following municipalities: Ossi, Sassari, Usini.

== Demographic evolution ==
Historical population

Year	Pop.	±%
1861	1,149	—
1871	1,204	+4.8%
1881	1,472	+22.3%
1901	1,202	−18.3%
1911	1,338	+11.3%

Year	Pop.	±%
1921	1,341	+0.2%
1931	1,293	−3.6%
1936	1,384	+7.0%
1951	1,500	+8.4%
1961	1,370	−8.7%

Year	Pop.	±%
1971	1,307	−4.6%
1981	1,358	+3.9%
1991	1,499	+10.4%
2001	1,875	+25.1%

Source: Data from ISTAT
