= Putifigari =

Putifigari Potuvigari (Sardinian)
- Comune
- Comune di Putifigari
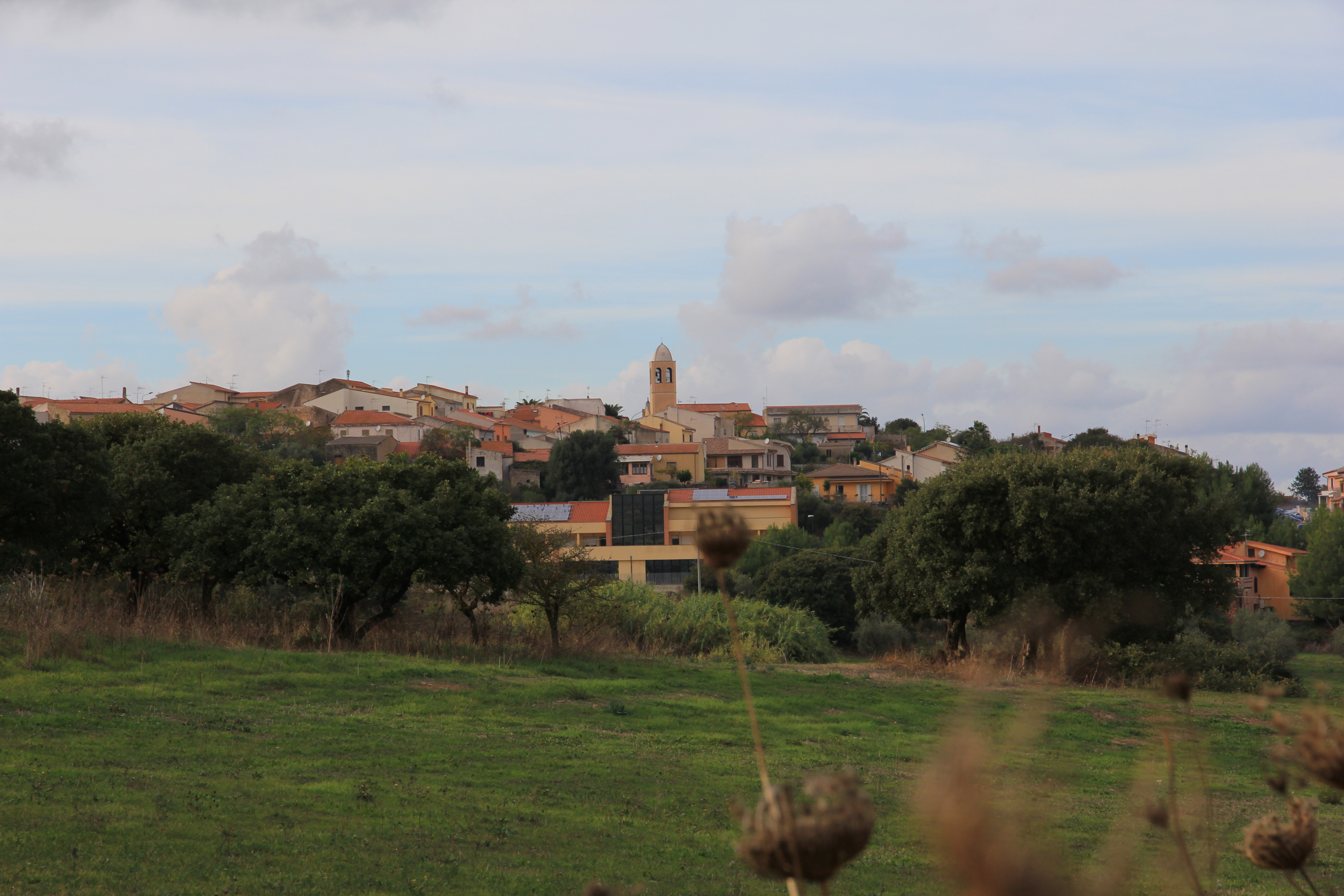
- View of Putifigari

- Location within Sardinia
- Coordinates: 40°33′41″N 8°27′37″E
- Country: Italy
- Region: Sardinia
- Metropolitan city: Sassari (SS)

Government
  - Mayor: Giancarlo Carta

Area
  - Total: 53.10 km^{2} (20.50 sq mi)
- Elevation: 267 m (876 ft)

Population (2026)
  - Total: 658
  - Density: 12.4/km^{2} (32.1/sq mi)
- Demonym(s): Putifigaresi, Potuvigaresos
- Time zone: UTC+1 (CET)
  - Summer (DST): UTC+2 (CEST)
- Postal code: 07040
- Dialing code: 079
- Website: Official website

Putifigari (Sardinian: Potuvigari) is a village and comune (municipality) in the Metropolitan City of Sassari in the autonomous island region of Sardinia in Italy, located about 160 kilometres (99 mi) northwest of Cagliari and about 20 kilometres (12 mi) southwest of Sassari. It has 658 inhabitants.

Putifigari borders the municipalities of Alghero, Ittiri, Uri, and Villanova Monteleone.

== Demographics ==
As of 2026, the population is 658, of which 50.5% are males, and 49.5% are females. Minors make up 12.2% of the population, and seniors make up 23.4%.

Historical population

Year	Pop.	±%
1861	499	—
1871	588	+17.8%
1881	632	+7.5%
1901	654	+3.5%
1911	679	+3.8%
1921	663	−2.4%
1931	576	−13.1%
1936	575	−0.2%

Year	Pop.	±%
1951	693	+20.5%
1961	735	+6.1%
1971	703	−4.4%
1981	727	+3.4%
1991	736	+1.2%
2001	701	−4.8%
2011	757	+8.0%
2021	691	−8.7%

Source: ISTAT

=== Immigration ===
As of 2025, immigrants make up 1.7% of the population. The 5 largest foreign countries of birth are Brazil, Romania, France, Belarus, and Germany.
