= Tula, Sardinia =

Tula
- Comune
- Comune di Tula
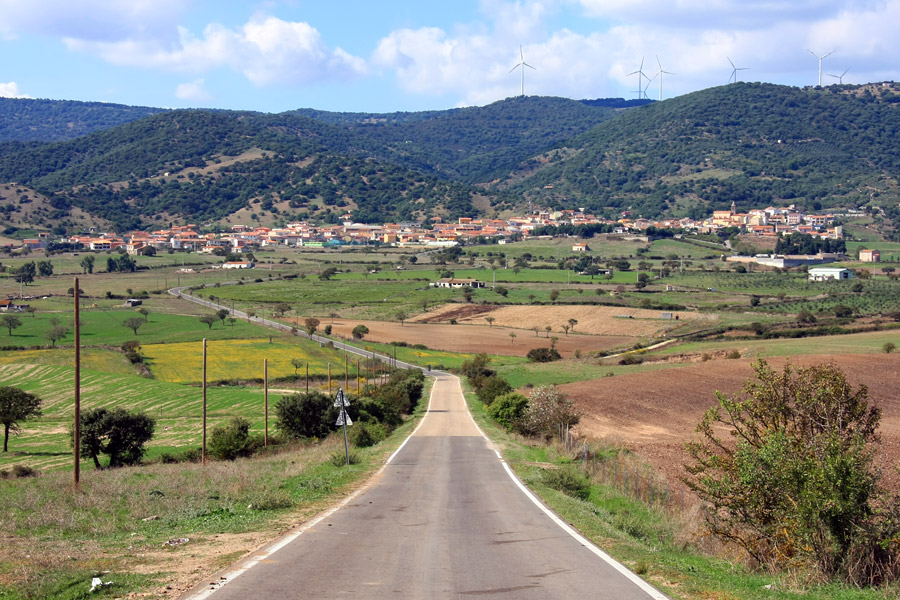

- Location within Sardinia
- Coordinates: 40°44′N 8°59′E
- Country: Italy
- Region: Sardinia
- Metropolitan city: Sassari (SS)

Area
  - Total: 65.6 km^{2} (25.3 sq mi)
- Elevation: 275 m (902 ft)

Population (Dec. 2004)
  - Total: 1,664
  - Density: 25.4/km^{2} (65.7/sq mi)
- Demonym: Tulesi
- Time zone: UTC+1 (CET)
  - Summer (DST): UTC+2 (CEST)
- Postal code: 07010
- Dialing code: 079

Tula (Sardinian: Tùla) is a comune (municipality) in the Metropolitan City of Sassari in the Italian region Sardinia, located about 170 kilometres (110 mi) north of Cagliari and about 35 kilometres (22 mi) east of Sassari. As of 31 December 2004, it had a population of 1,664 and an area of 65.6 square kilometres (25.3 mi^{2}).

Tula borders the following municipalities: Erula, Oschiri, Ozieri, Tempio Pausania.

Tula is known as the birthplace of George Sodder, an Italian-American man who is known for the disappearance of five of his children.

== Demographic evolution ==
Historical population

Year	Pop.	±%
1861	1,078	—
1871	1,140	+5.8%
1881	1,174	+3.0%
1901	1,393	+18.7%
1911	1,429	+2.6%

Year	Pop.	±%
1921	1,426	−0.2%
1931	1,596	+11.9%
1936	1,630	+2.1%
1951	2,110	+29.4%
1961	2,008	−4.8%

Year	Pop.	±%
1971	1,618	−19.4%
1981	1,704	+5.3%
1991	1,709	+0.3%
2001	1,665	−2.6%
2011	1,598	−4.0%

Source: Data from ISTAT
