= Erula =

Erula Èrula (Sardinian) Èrula (Gallurese)
- Comune
- Comune di Erula
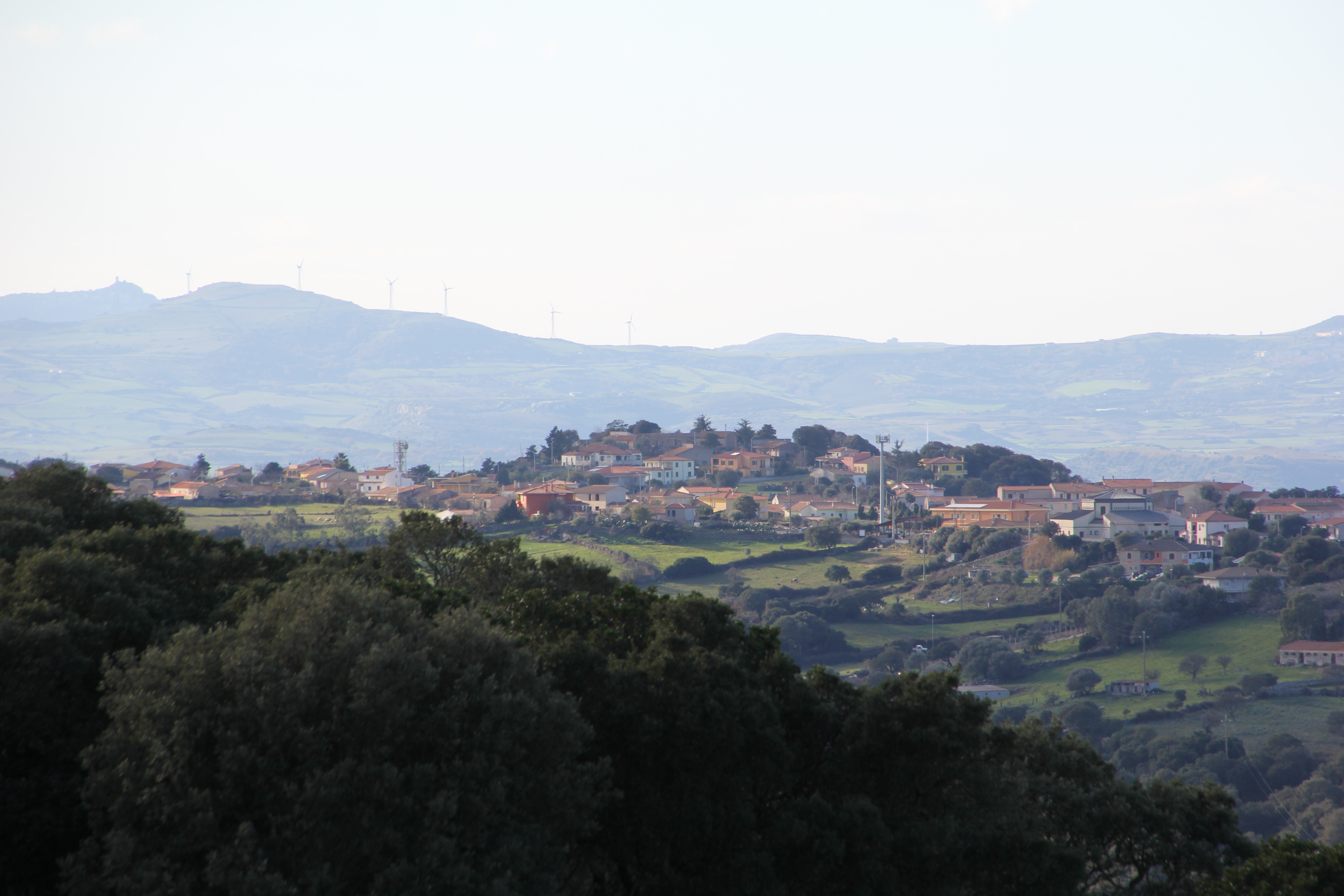
- View of Erula

- Location within Sardinia
- Coordinates: 40°48′N 8°57′E
- Country: Italy
- Region: Sardinia
- Metropolitan city: Sassari (SS)
- Frazioni: Sa Mela, Tettile

Area
  - Total: 39.31 km^{2} (15.18 sq mi)
- Elevation: 457 m (1,499 ft)

Population (2026)
  - Total: 702
  - Density: 17.9/km^{2} (46.3/sq mi)
- Demonym: Erulesi
- Time zone: UTC+1 (CET)
  - Summer (DST): UTC+2 (CEST)
- Postal code: 07030
- Dialing code: 079

Erula (Sardinian: Èrula, Gallurese: Èrula) is a village and comune (municipality) in the Metropolitan City of Sassari in the autonomous island region of Sardinia in Italy, located about 180 kilometres (110 mi) north of Cagliari and about 35 kilometres (22 mi) east of Sassari. It has 702 inhabitants.

The municipality of Erula contains the frazioni (subdivisions, mainly villages and hamlets) Sa Mela and Tettile.

Erula borders the municipalities of Chiaramonti, Ozieri, Perfugas, Tempio Pausania, and Tula.

== Demographics ==
As of 2026, the population is 702, of which 50.0% are male, and 50.0% are female. Minors make up 12.5% of the population, and seniors make up 31.6%.

Historical population

Year	Pop.	±%
1861	429	—
1871	459	+7.0%
1881	468	+2.0%
1901	547	+16.9%
1911	655	+19.7%
1921	591	−9.8%
1931	667	+12.9%
1936	731	+9.6%

Year	Pop.	±%
1951	925	+26.5%
1961	915	−1.1%
1971	779	−14.9%
1981	807	+3.6%
1991	787	−2.5%
2001	807	+2.5%
2011	766	−5.1%
2021	691	−9.8%

Source: ISTAT

=== Immigration ===
As of 2025, immigrants make up 2.7% of the population. The 5 largest foreign countries of birth are Romania, Denmark, France, Germany, and the United Kingdom.
