= Padria =

Padria Pàdria (Sardinian)
- Comune
- Comune di Padria
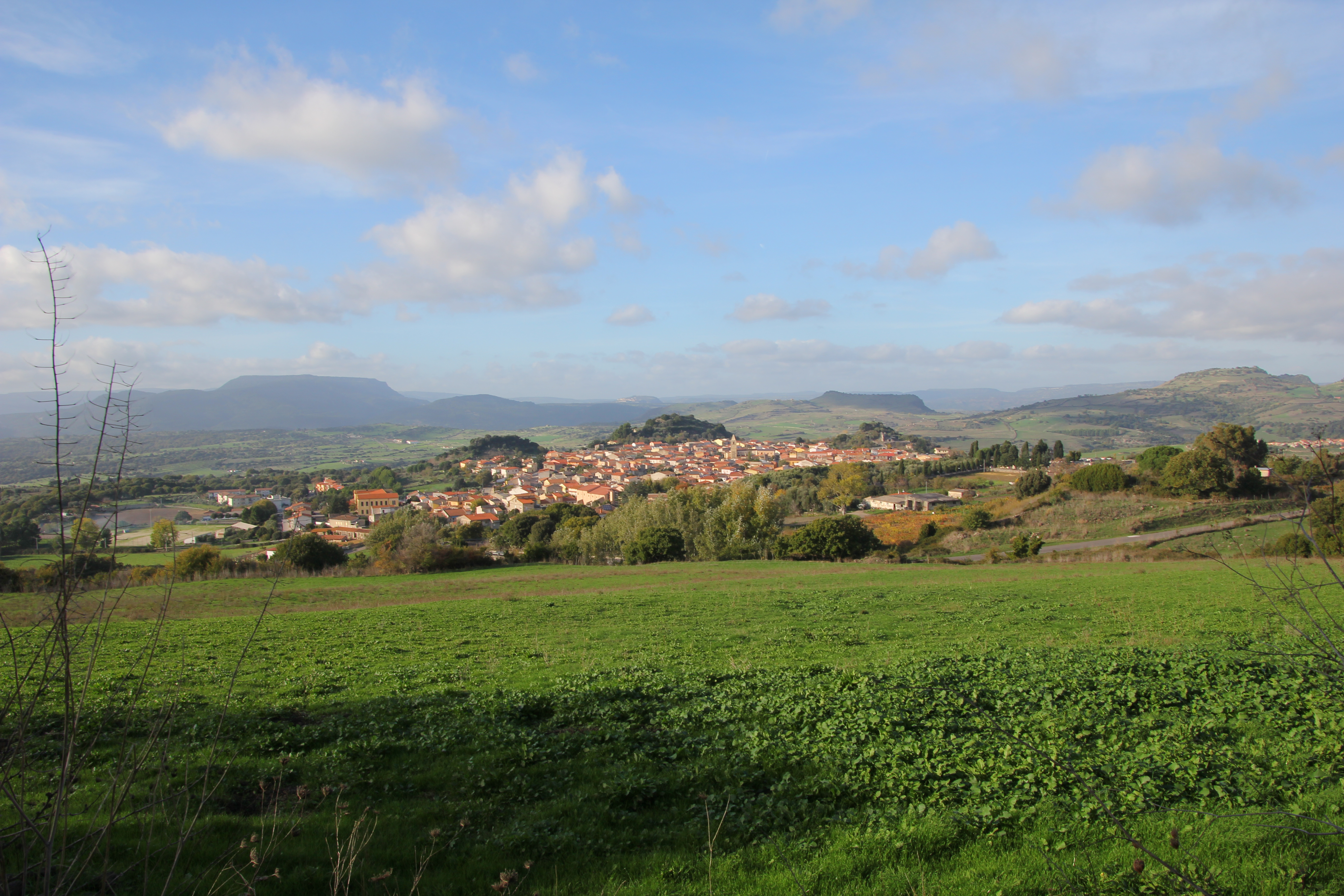
- View of Padria

- Location within Sardinia
- Coordinates: 40°24′N 8°38′E
- Country: Italy
- Region: Sardinia
- Metropolitan city: Sassari (SS)

Area
  - Total: 48.39 km^{2} (18.68 sq mi)
- Elevation: 304 m (997 ft)

Population (2026)
  - Total: 574
  - Density: 11.9/km^{2} (30.7/sq mi)
- Time zone: UTC+1 (CET)
  - Summer (DST): UTC+2 (CEST)
- Postal code: 07015
- Dialing code: 079

Padria (Sardinian: Pàdria) is a village and comune (municipality) in the Metropolitan City of Sassari in the autonomous island region of Sardinia in Italy, located about 140 kilometres (87 mi) northwest of Cagliari and about 40 kilometres (25 mi) south of Sassari. It has 574 inhabitants.

Padria borders the municipalities of Bosa, Cossoine, Mara, Monteleone Rocca Doria, Pozzomaggiore, Romana, and Villanova Monteleone.

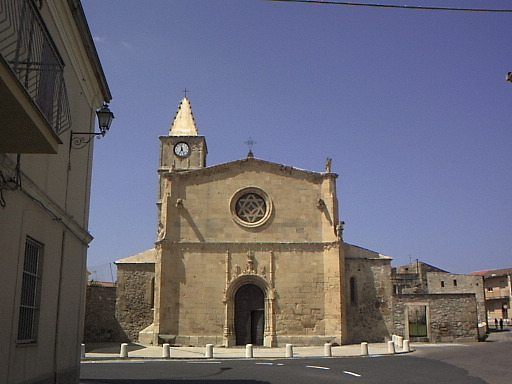
Santa Giulia church

== Demographics ==
As of 2026, the population is 574, of which 51.0% are males, and 49.0% are females. Minors make up 9.8% of the population, and seniors make up 38.5%.

Historical population

Year	Pop.	±%
1861	1,722	—
1871	1,855	+7.7%
1881	1,925	+3.8%
1901	2,096	+8.9%
1911	2,120	+1.1%
1921	2,119	−0.0%
1931	2,013	−5.0%
1936	2,029	+0.8%

Year	Pop.	±%
1951	2,067	+1.9%
1961	1,837	−11.1%
1971	1,307	−28.9%
1981	1,126	−13.8%
1991	918	−18.5%
2001	836	−8.9%
2011	695	−16.9%
2021	605	−12.9%

Source: ISTAT

=== Immigration ===
As of 2025, immigrants make up 6.9% of the population. The 5 largest foreign countries of birth are Germany, Morocco, Romania, United Kingdom, and Austria.
