= Mara, Sardinia =

Mara
- Comune
- Comune di Mara
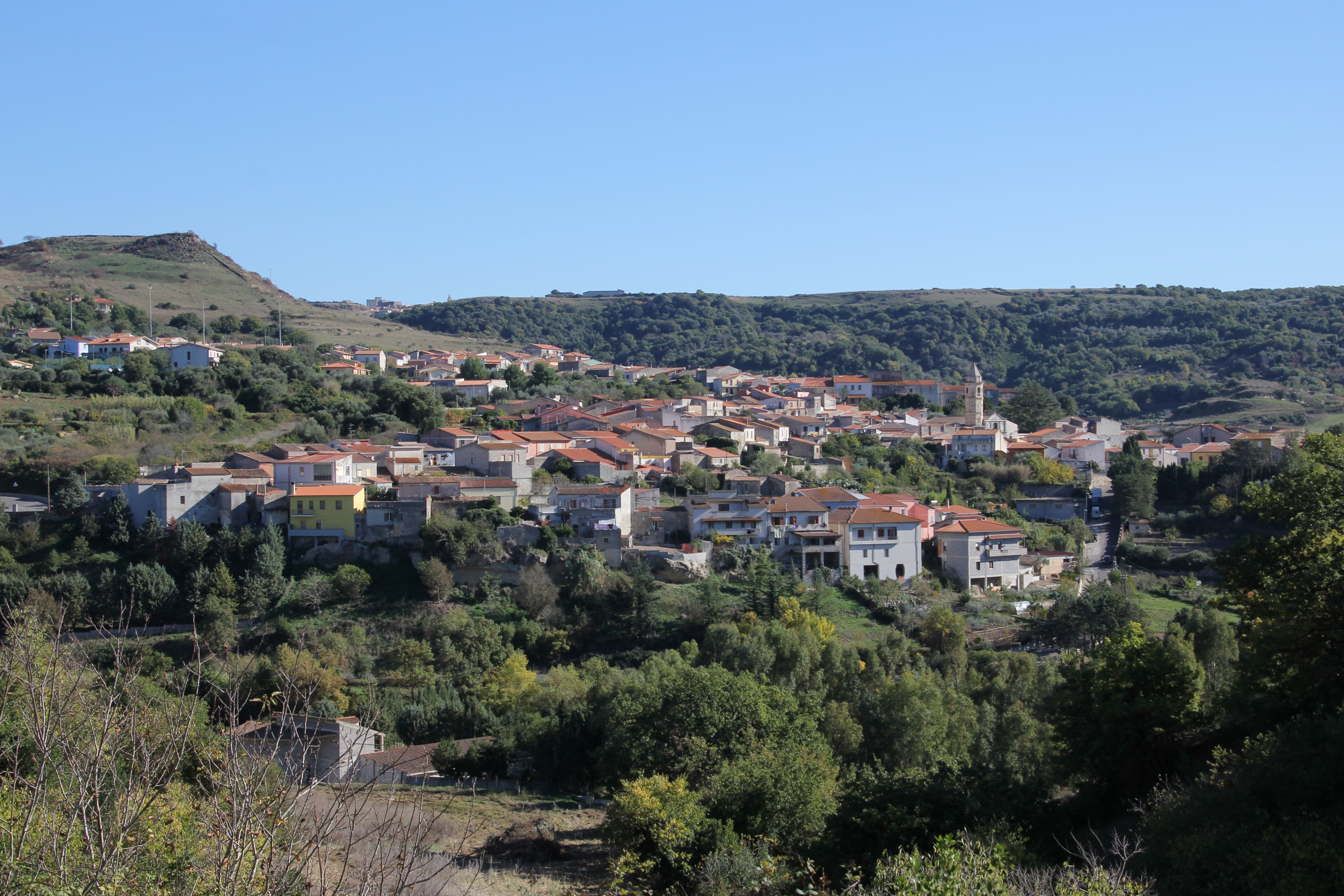
- View of Mara

- Coat of arms

- Location within Sardinia
- Coordinates: 40°25′N 8°38′E
- Country: Italy
- Region: Sardinia
- Metropolitan city: Sassari (SS)

Government
  - Mayor: Salvatore Ligios

Area
  - Total: 18.64 km^{2} (7.20 sq mi)
- Elevation: 258 m (846 ft)

Population (2026)
  - Total: 518
  - Density: 27.8/km^{2} (72.0/sq mi)
- Demonym: Maresi
- Time zone: UTC+1 (CET)
  - Summer (DST): UTC+2 (CEST)
- Postal code: 07010
- Dialing code: 079
- Patron saint: St. John the Baptist
- Saint day: 24 June

Mara is a village and comune (municipality) in the Metropolitan City of Sassari in the autonomous island region of Sardinia in Italy, located about 140 kilometres (87 mi) northwest of Cagliari and about 35 kilometres (22 mi) south of Sassari. It has 518 inhabitants.

Mara borders the municipalities of Cossoine, Padria, and Pozzomaggiore.

== Demographics ==
As of 2026, the population is 518, of which 48.5% are male, and 51.5% are female. Minors make up 10.0% of the population, and seniors make up 40.9%.

Historical population

Year	Pop.	±%
1861	701	—
1871	843	+20.3%
1881	814	−3.4%
1901	976	+19.9%
1911	1,049	+7.5%
1921	1,064	+1.4%
1931	1,132	+6.4%
1936	1,158	+2.3%

Year	Pop.	±%
1951	1,319	+13.9%
1961	1,346	+2.0%
1971	1,041	−22.7%
1981	985	−5.4%
1991	927	−5.9%
2001	808	−12.8%
2011	682	−15.6%
2021	526	−22.9%

Source: ISTAT

=== Immigration ===
As of 2025, immigrants make up 2.3% of the population. The 5 largest foreign countries of birth are Germany, Russia, Switzerland, Georgia, and Slovakia.

== Sights ==
=== Religious buildings ===
- Sanctuary of Our Lady of Bonu Ighinu
- Church of Saint John
- Church of Saint Cross

=== Caves ===
- Cave of Sa Ucca de su Tintirriolu
- Cave of Filiestru
