= Monteleone Rocca Doria =

Monteleone Rocca Doria Monteleone (Sardinian)
- Comune
- Comune di Monteleone Rocca Doria
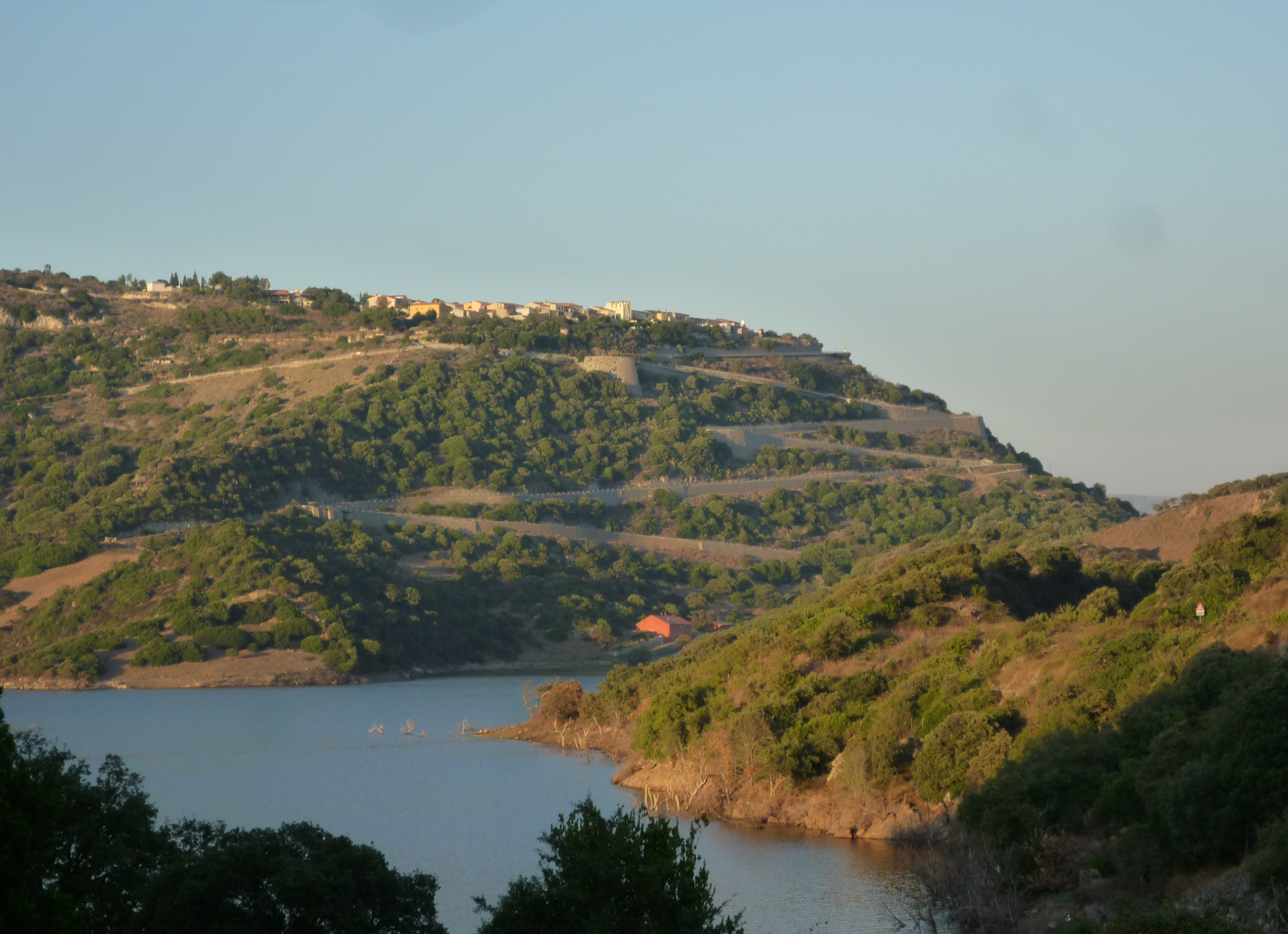
- View of Monteleone Rocca Doria

- Location within Sardinia
- Coordinates: 40°28′N 8°34′E
- Country: Italy
- Region: Sardinia
- Metropolitan city: Sassari (SS)

Area
  - Total: 13.39 km^{2} (5.17 sq mi)

Population (2026)
  - Total: 105
  - Density: 7.84/km^{2} (20.3/sq mi)
- Time zone: UTC+1 (CET)
  - Summer (DST): UTC+2 (CEST)
- Postal code: 07010
- Dialing code: 079

Monteleone Rocca Doria (Sardinian: Monteleone) is a village and comune (municipality) in the Metropolitan City of Sassari in the autonomous island region of Sardinia, located about 150 kilometres (93 mi) northwest of Cagliari and about 30 kilometres (19 mi) south of Sassari. It has 105 inhabitants.

Monteleone Rocca Doria borders the municipalities of Padria, Romana, and Villanova Monteleone.

== Demographics ==
As of 2026, the population is 105, of which 50.5% are male, and 49.5% are female. Minors make up 9.5% of the population, and seniors make up 26.7%.

Historical population

Year	Pop.	±%
1861	384	—
1871	389	+1.3%
1881	368	−5.4%
1901	420	+14.1%
1911	443	+5.5%
1921	347	−21.7%
1931	393	+13.3%
1936	385	−2.0%

Year	Pop.	±%
1951	384	−0.3%
1961	317	−17.4%
1971	212	−33.1%
1981	202	−4.7%
1991	140	−30.7%
2001	134	−4.3%
2011	117	−12.7%
2021	111	−5.1%

Source: ISTAT

=== Immigration ===
As of 2025, immigrants make up 2.9% of the population. The foreign countries of birth are Albania, France, and the United States.
