= Banari =

Banari Bànari (Sardinian)
- Comune
- Comune di Banari
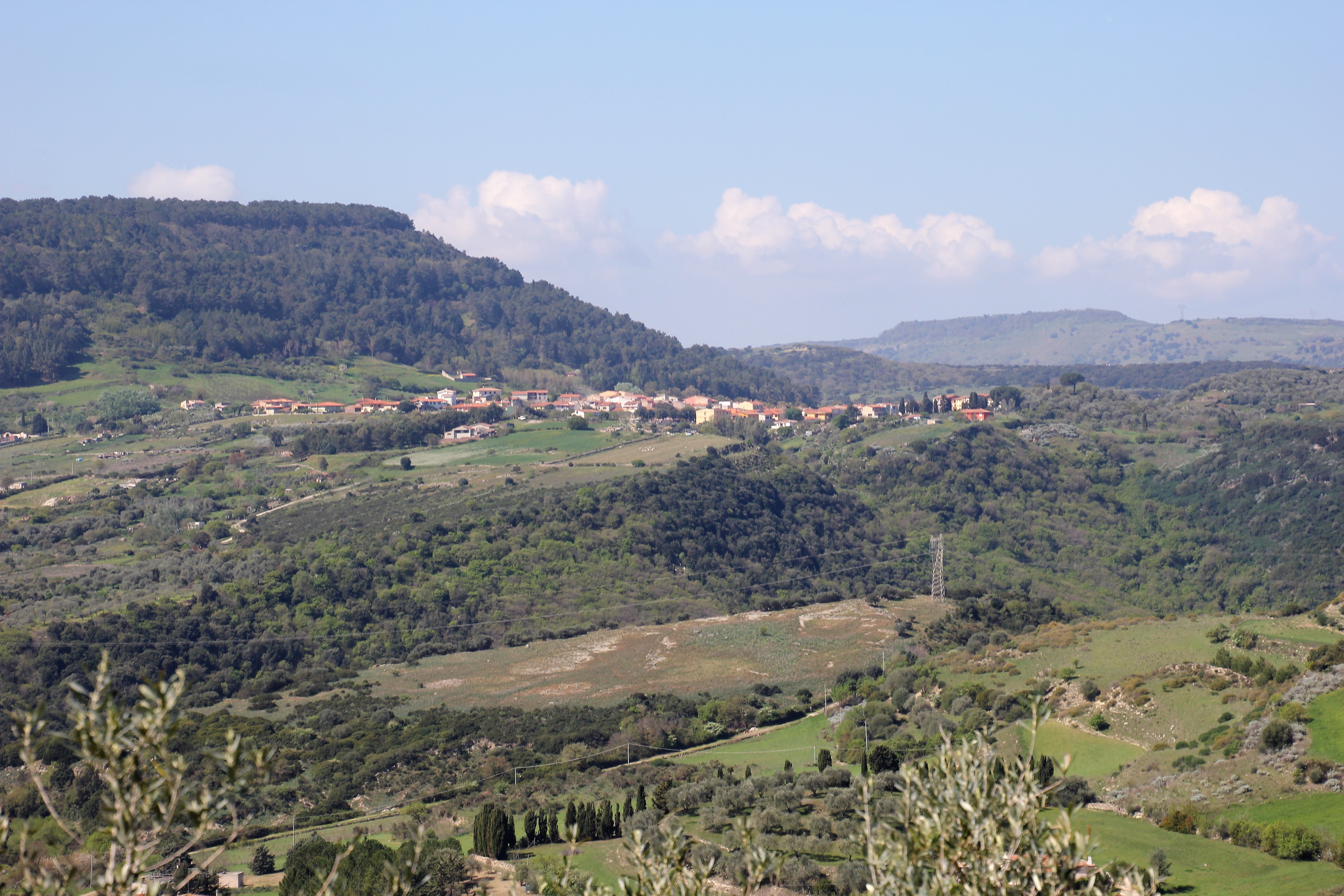
- View of Banari

- Coat of arms

- Location within Sardinia
- Coordinates: 40°34′N 8°42′E
- Country: Italy
- Region: Sardinia
- Metropolitan city: Sassari

Government
  - Mayor: Antonio Carboni

Area
  - Total: 21.25 km^{2} (8.20 sq mi)
- Elevation: 419 m (1,375 ft)

Population (2026)
  - Total: 508
  - Density: 23.9/km^{2} (61.9/sq mi)
- Demonym: Banaresi
- Time zone: UTC+1 (CET)
  - Summer (DST): UTC+2 (CEST)
- Postal code: 07040
- Dialing code: 079
- Website: Official website

Banari (Sardinian: Bànari) is a village and comune (municipality) in the Metropolitan City of Sassari in the autonomous island region of Sardinia in Italy, located about 150 kilometres (93 mi) north of Cagliari and about 20 kilometres (12 mi) southeast of Sassari. It has 508 inhabitants.

Banari borders the municipalities of Bessude, Florinas, Ittiri, and Siligo.

== Demographics ==
As of 2026, the population is 508, of which 50.8% are male, and 49.2% are female. Minors make up 11.4% of the population, and seniors make up 38.8%.

Historical population

Year	Pop.	±%
1861	1,214	—
1871	1,357	+11.8%
1881	1,345	−0.9%
1901	1,503	+11.7%
1911	1,517	+0.9%
1921	1,462	−3.6%
1931	1,355	−7.3%
1936	1,369	+1.0%

Year	Pop.	±%
1951	1,444	+5.5%
1961	1,198	−17.0%
1971	877	−26.8%
1981	931	+6.2%
1991	756	−18.8%
2001	677	−10.4%
2011	610	−9.9%
2021	535	−12.3%

Source: ISTAT

=== Immigration ===
As of 2025, immigrants make up 6.5% of the population. The 5 largest foreign countries of birth are France, Morocco, Australia, Germany, and Poland.
