= Sennori =

- Comune
- Comune di Sennori
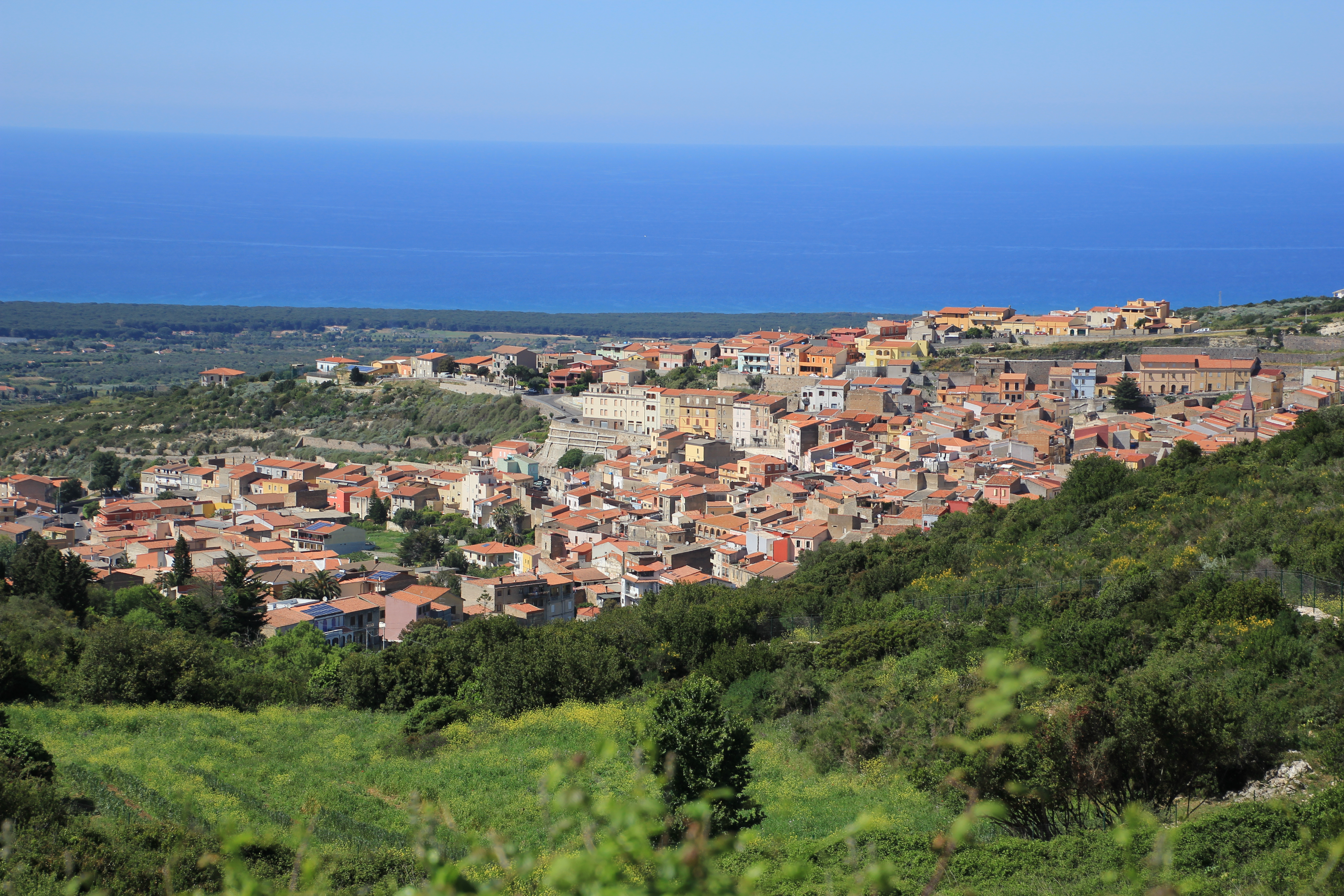

- Location within Sardinia
- Coordinates: 40°47′N 8°36′E
- Country: Italy
- Region: Sardinia
- Metropolitan city: Sassari (SS)

Area
  - Total: 31.4 km^{2} (12.1 sq mi)
- Elevation: 350 m (1,150 ft)

Population (Dec. 2004)
  - Total: 7,298
  - Density: 232/km^{2} (602/sq mi)
- Demonym: Sennoresi
- Time zone: UTC+1 (CET)
  - Summer (DST): UTC+2 (CEST)
- Postal code: 07036
- Dialing code: 079

Sennori (Sardinian: Sènnaru) is a comune (municipality) in the Metropolitan City of Sassari in the Italian region Sardinia, located about 180 kilometres (110 mi) north of Cagliari and about 7 kilometres (4 mi) northeast of Sassari. As of 31 December 2004, it had a population of 7,298 and an area of 31.4 square kilometres (12.1 mi^{2}).

Sennori borders the following municipalities: Osilo, Sassari, Sorso, Tergu.

== Demographic evolution ==
Historical population

Year	Pop.	±%
1861	2,118	—
1871	2,383	+12.5%
1881	3,082	+29.3%
1901	3,207	+4.1%
1911	3,640	+13.5%

Year	Pop.	±%
1921	3,837	+5.4%
1931	4,240	+10.5%
1936	4,527	+6.8%
1951	5,188	+14.6%
1961	5,578	+7.5%

Year	Pop.	±%
1971	6,190	+11.0%
1981	6,896	+11.4%
1991	7,252	+5.2%
2001	7,365	+1.6%

Source: Data from ISTAT
