= Semestene =

Semestene Semèstene (Sardinian)
- Comune
- Comune di Semestene
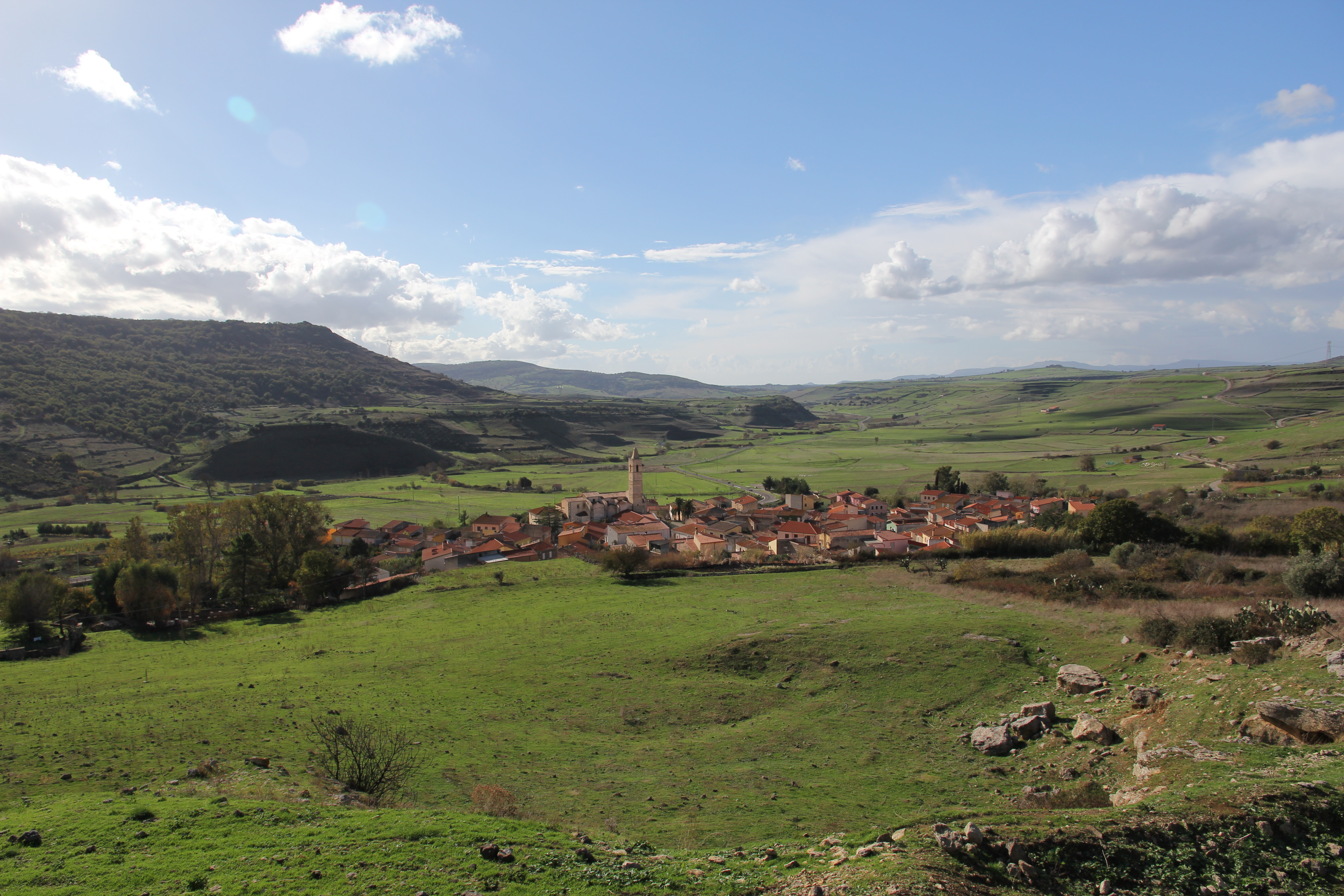
- View of Semestene

- Location within Sardinia
- Coordinates: 40°24′N 8°44′E
- Country: Italy
- Region: Sardinia
- Metropolitan city: Sassari (SS)

Area
  - Total: 39.58 km^{2} (15.28 sq mi)

Population (2026)
  - Total: 127
  - Density: 3.21/km^{2} (8.31/sq mi)
- Time zone: UTC+1 (CET)
  - Summer (DST): UTC+2 (CEST)
- Postal code: 07010
- Dialing code: 079

Semestene (Sardinian: Semèstene) is a village and comune (municipality) in the Metropolitan City of Sassari in the autonomous island region of Sardinia in Italy, located about 140 kilometres (87 mi) north of Cagliari and about 40 kilometres (25 mi) southeast of Sassari. It has 127 inhabitants.

Semestene borders the municipalities of Bonorva, Cossoine, Macomer, Pozzomaggiore, and Sindia.

== Demographics ==
As of 2026, the population is 127, of which 45.7% are male, and 54.3% are female. Minors make up 3.9% of the population, and seniors make up 40.2%.

Historical population

Year	Pop.	±%
1861	658	—
1871	650	−1.2%
1881	627	−3.5%
1901	679	+8.3%
1911	742	+9.3%
1921	739	−0.4%
1931	727	−1.6%
1936	737	+1.4%

Year	Pop.	±%
1951	744	+0.9%
1961	671	−9.8%
1971	435	−35.2%
1981	348	−20.0%
1991	296	−14.9%
2001	227	−23.3%
2011	171	−24.7%
2021	141	−17.5%

Source: ISTAT

=== Immigration ===
As of 2025, immigrants make up 13.2% of the population. The 5 largest foreign countries of birth are Morocco, the United Kingdom, Romania, the United States, and Belarus.
