= Usini =

- Comune
- Comune di Usini
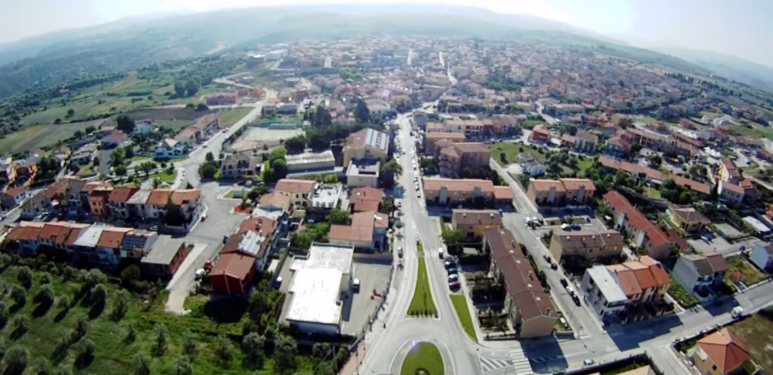

- Location within Sardinia
- Coordinates: 40°40′N 8°32′E
- Country: Italy
- Region: Sardinia
- Metropolitan city: Sassari (SS)
- Frazioni: Ittiri, Ossi, Sassari, Tissi, Uri

Area
  - Total: 30.68 km^{2} (11.85 sq mi)
- Elevation: 200 m (660 ft)

Population (28 February 2009)
  - Total: 4,200
  - Density: 140/km^{2} (350/sq mi)
- Demonym: Usinesi
- Time zone: UTC+1 (CET)
  - Summer (DST): UTC+2 (CEST)
- Postal code: 07049
- Dialing code: 079
- ISTAT code: 090077
- Patron saint: Natività di Maria Vergine
- Saint day: 8 September
- Website: Official website

Usini is a town and comune in the Metropolitan City of Sassari, Sardinia, Italy.
