= Thiesi =

Thiesi Tiesi
- Comune
- Comune di Thiesi
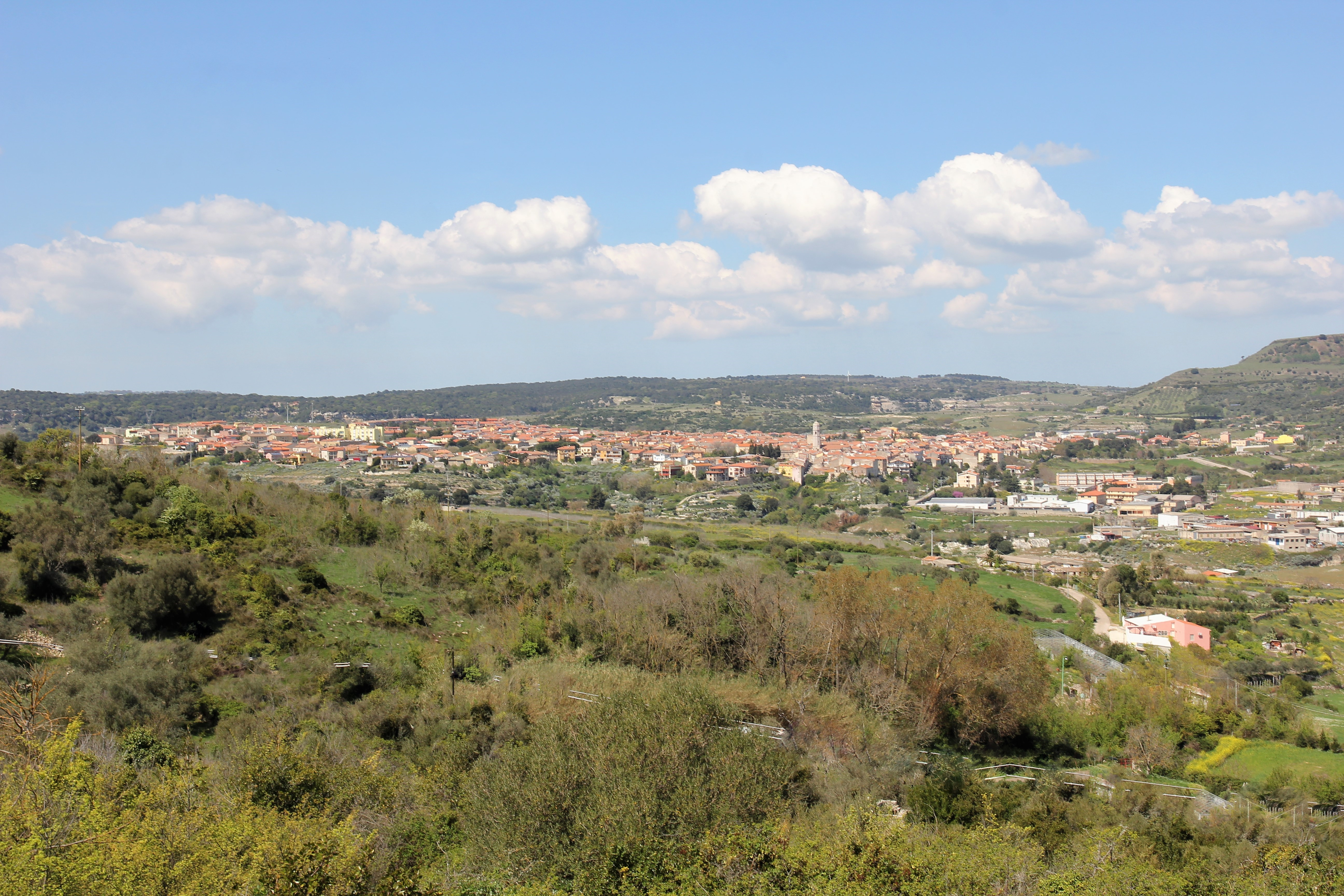

- Location within Sardinia
- Coordinates: 40°31′N 8°43′E
- Country: Italy
- Region: Sardinia
- Metropolitan city: Sassari (SS)

Government
  - Mayor: Gianfranco Soletta (since 2020)

Area
  - Total: 63.83 km^{2} (24.64 sq mi)
- Elevation: 461 m (1,512 ft)

Population (2024)
  - Total: 2,717
  - Density: 42.57/km^{2} (110.2/sq mi)
- Demonym: Thiesini
- Time zone: UTC+1 (CET)
  - Summer (DST): UTC+2 (CEST)
- Postal code: 07047
- Dialing code: 079
- Patron saint: Saint Victoria
- Saint day: December 23

Thiesi (Sardinian: Tiesi) is a town and comune located in the Metropolitan City of Sassari, in Sardinia, Italy. It has a population of 2,717.

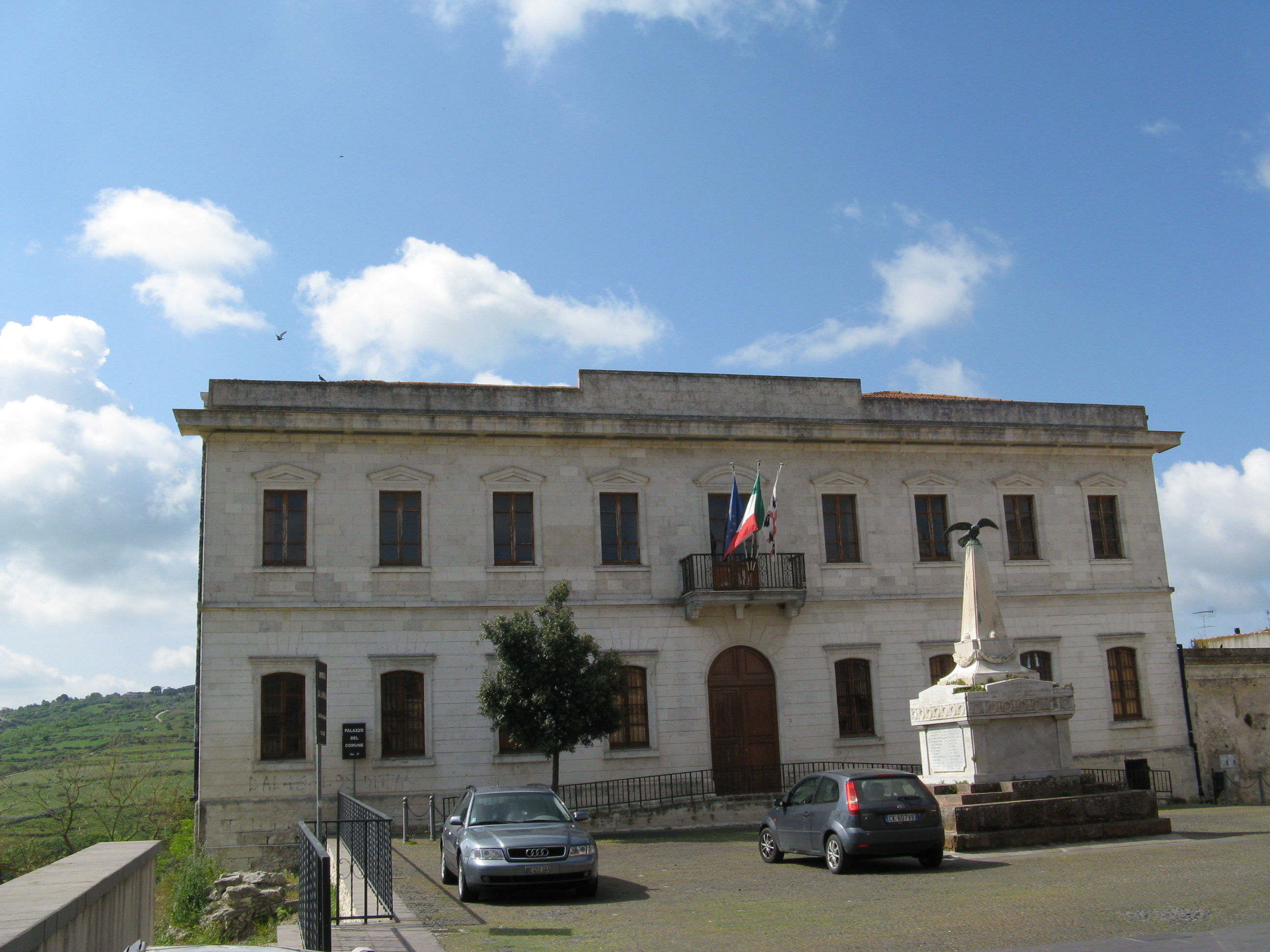
City Hall

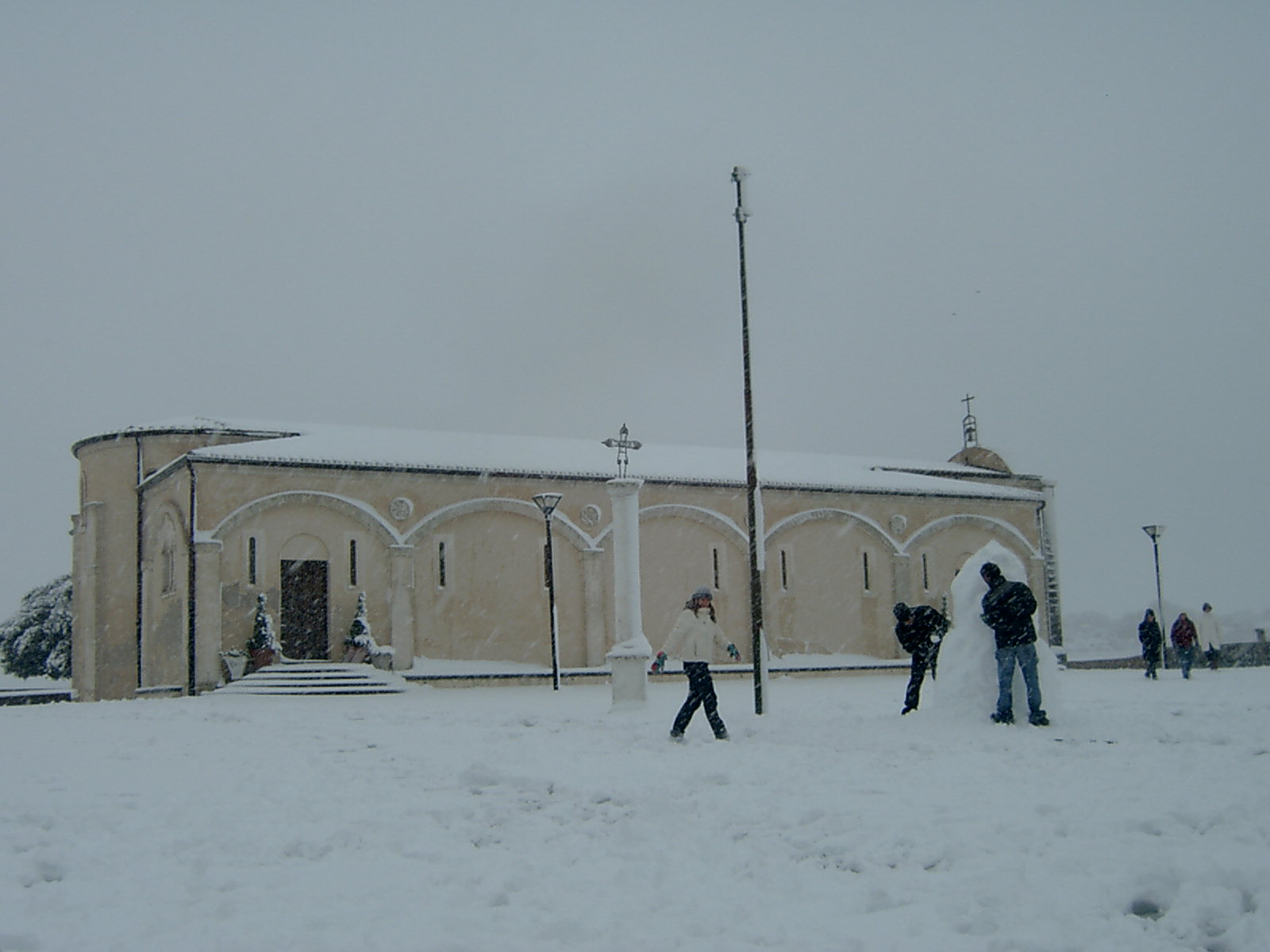
Sanctuary of Seunis

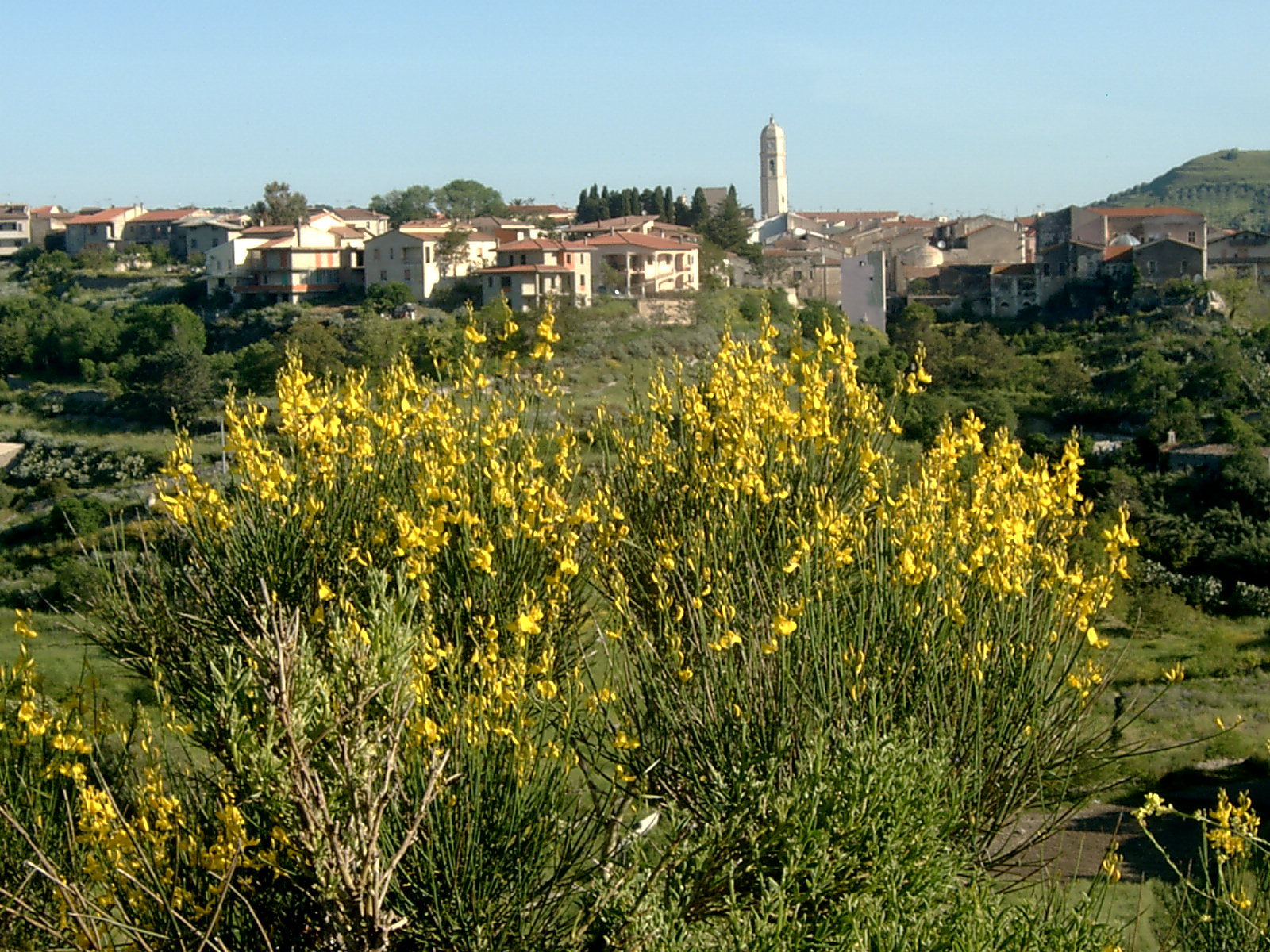
Panorama

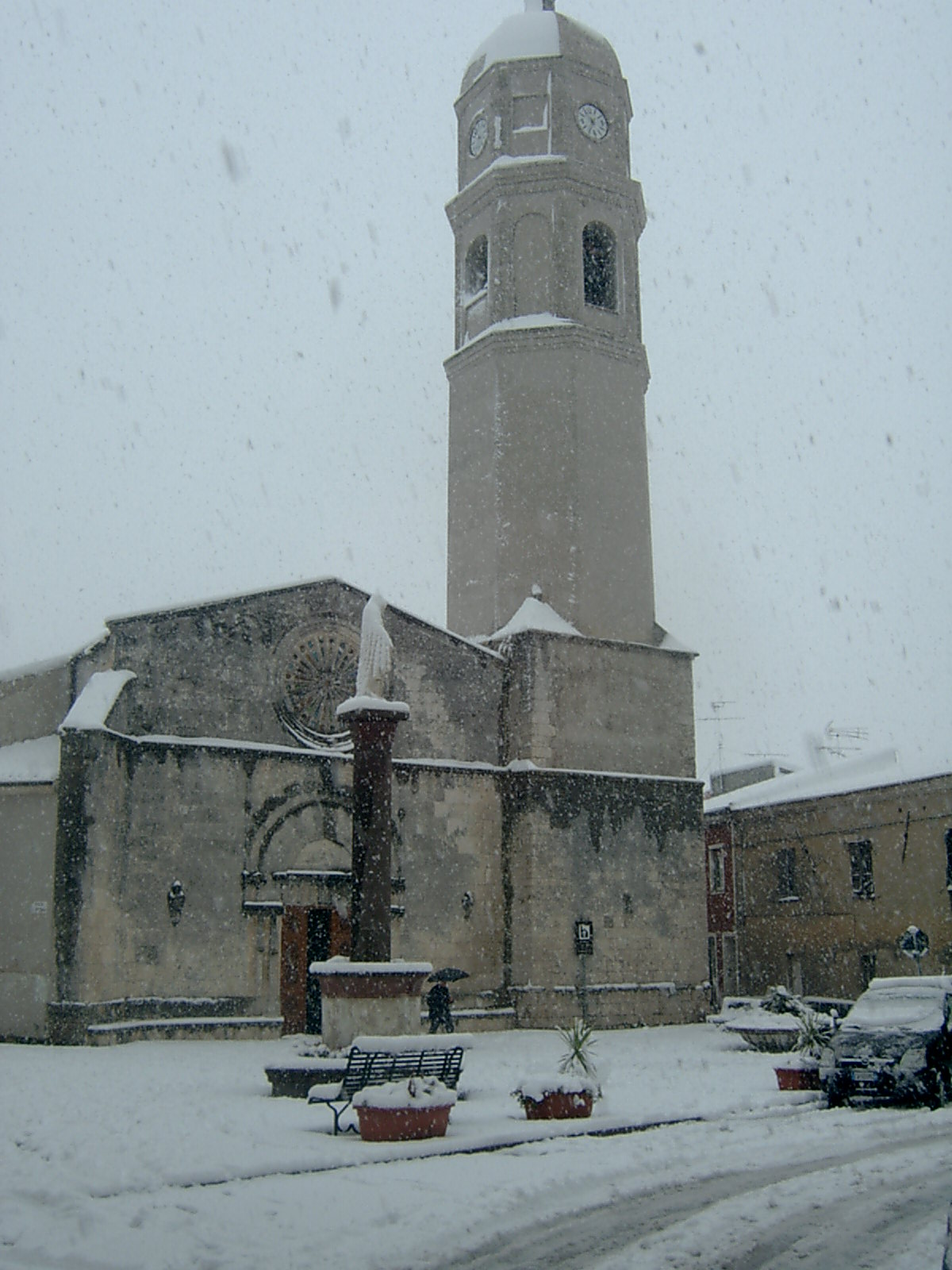
Santa Vittoria
