= Castles of Sardinia =

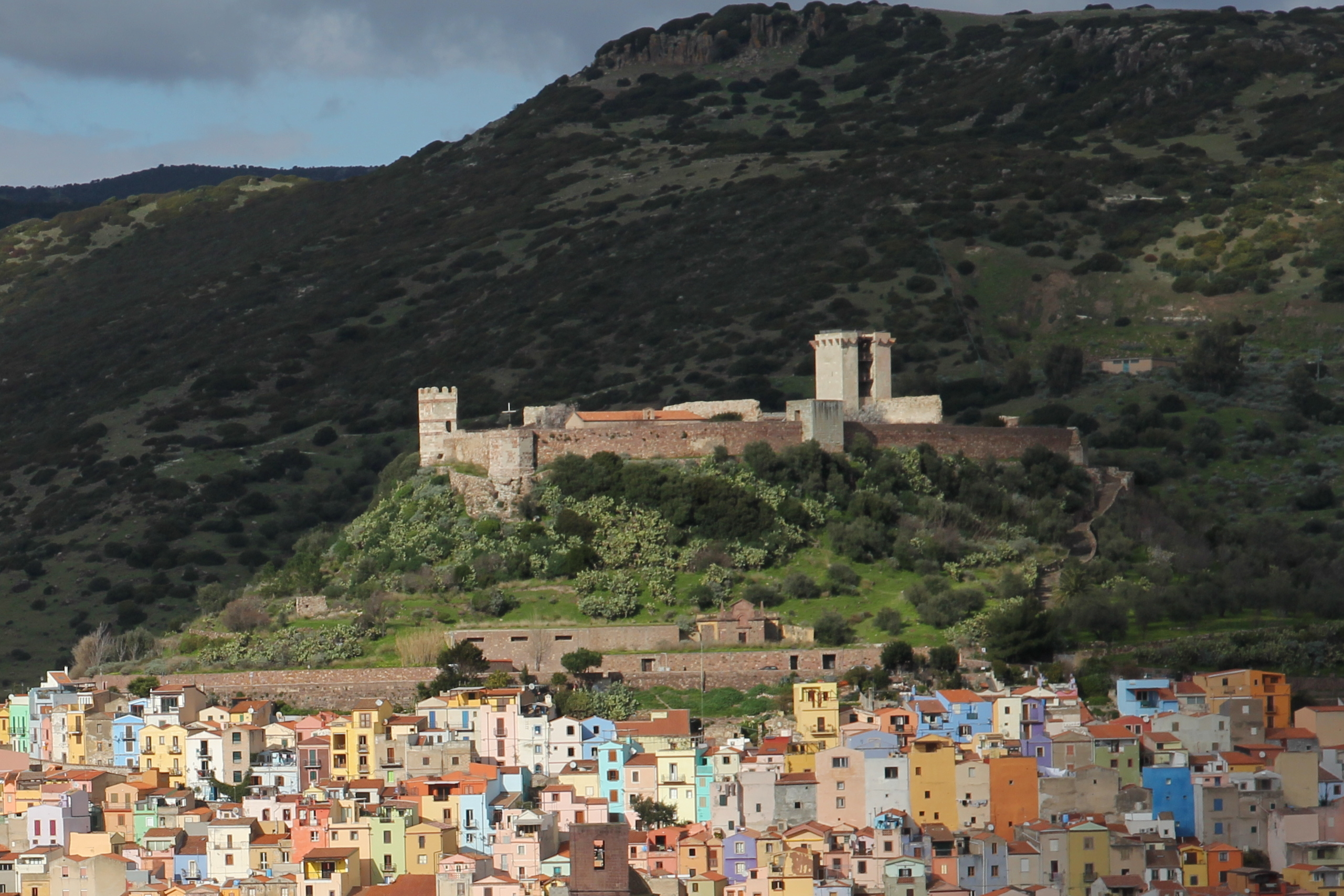
Castle of Serravalle, Bosa

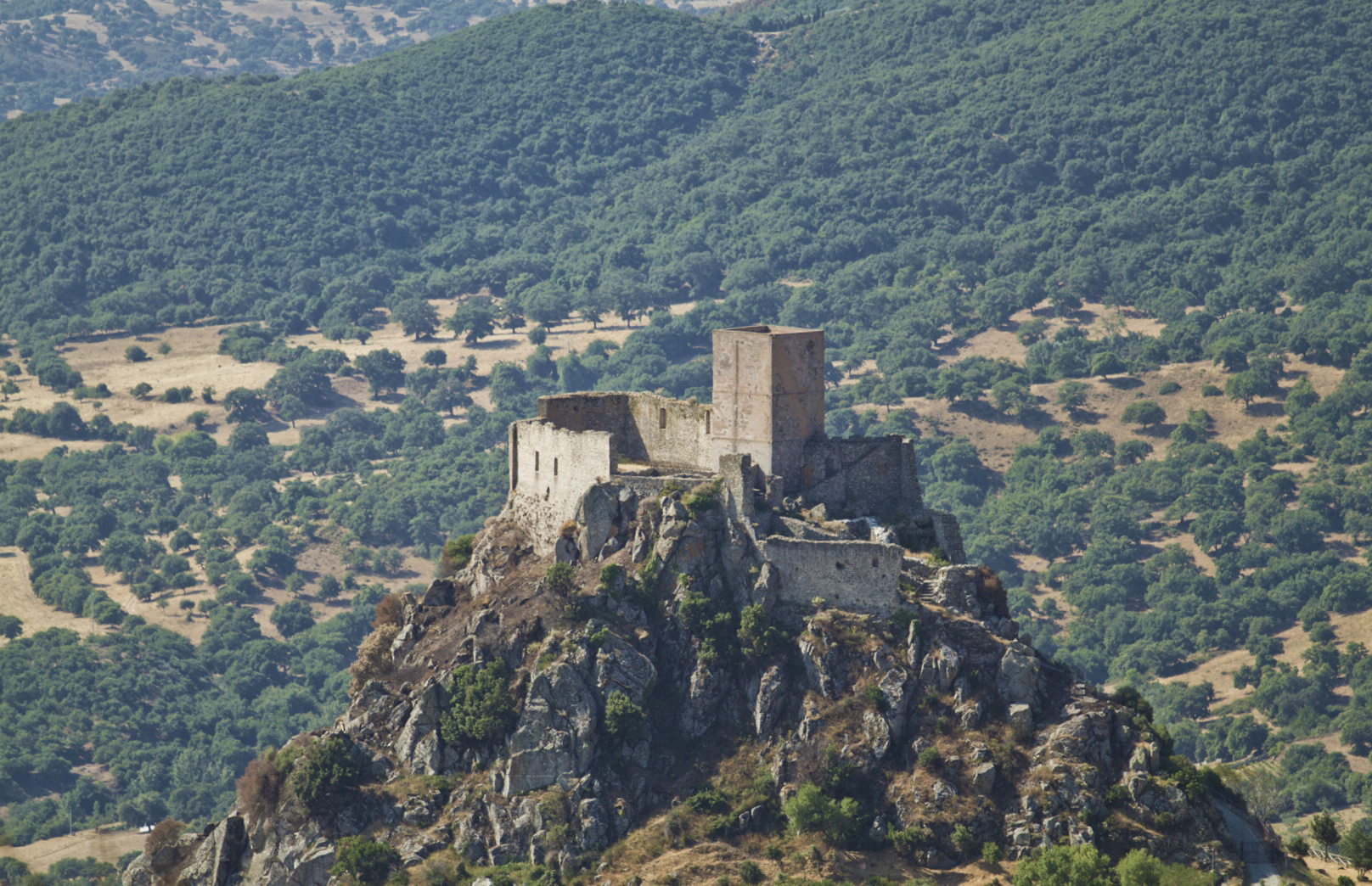
Castle of Burgos

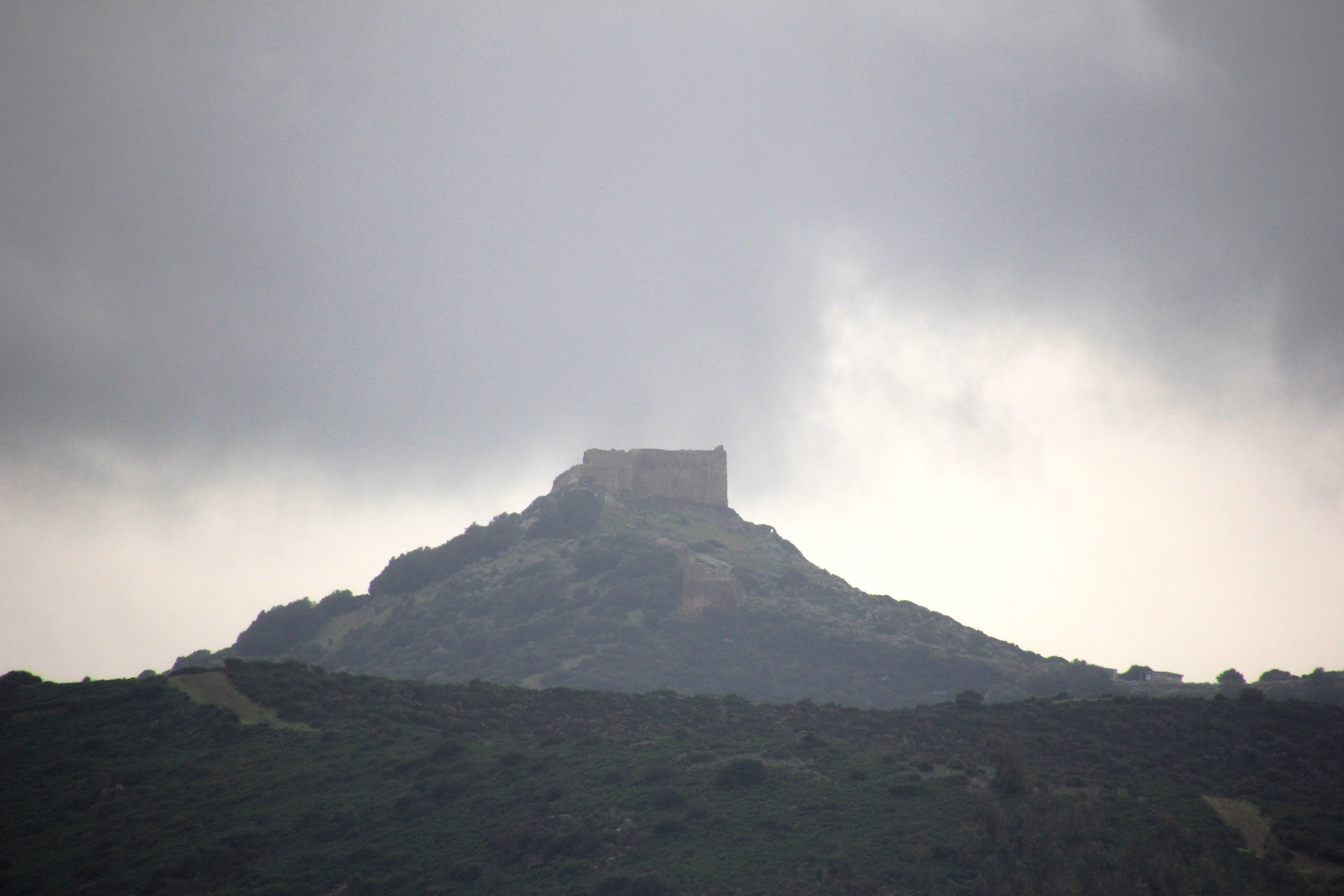
Castle of Monreale, Sardara

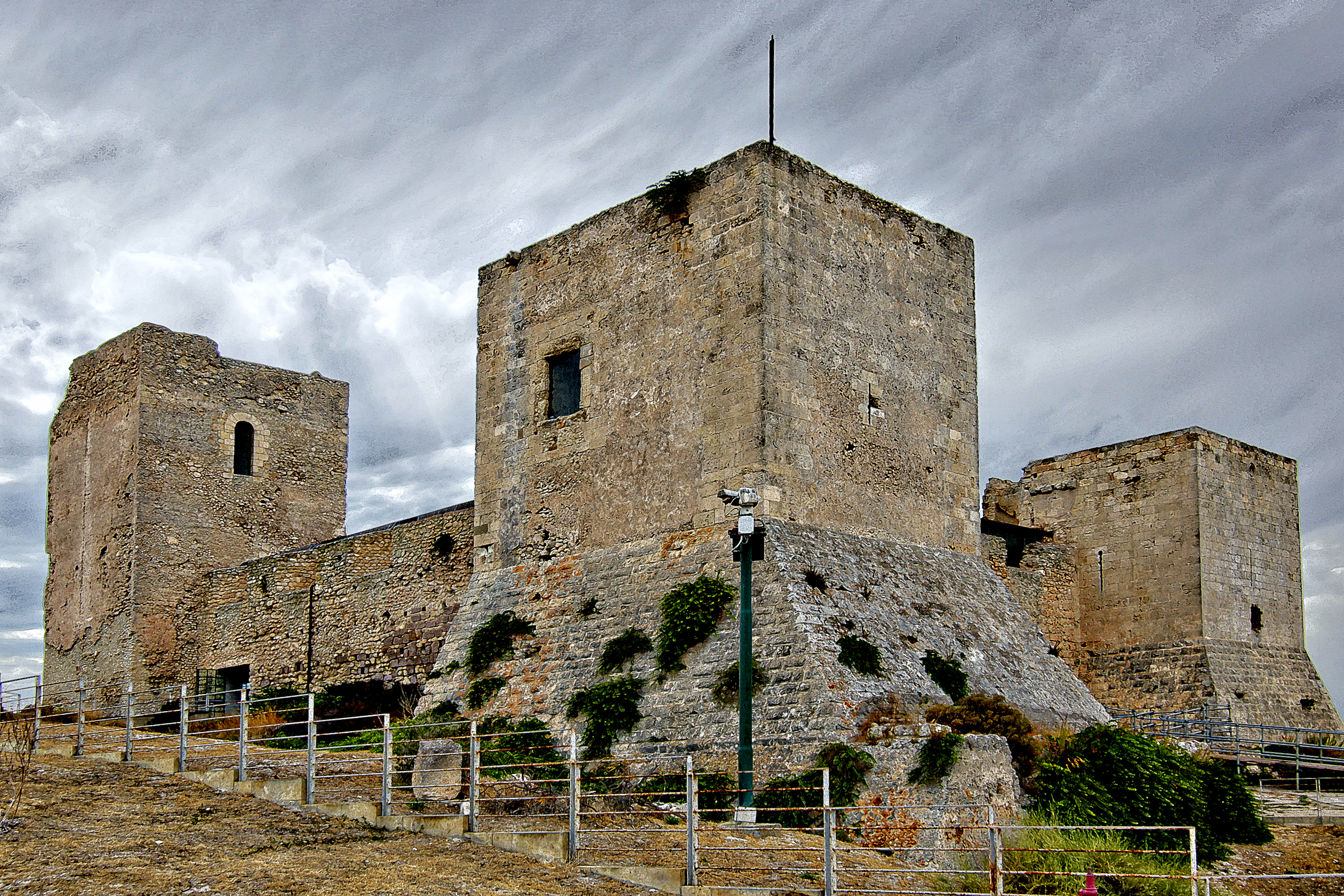
Castle of San Michele, Cagliari

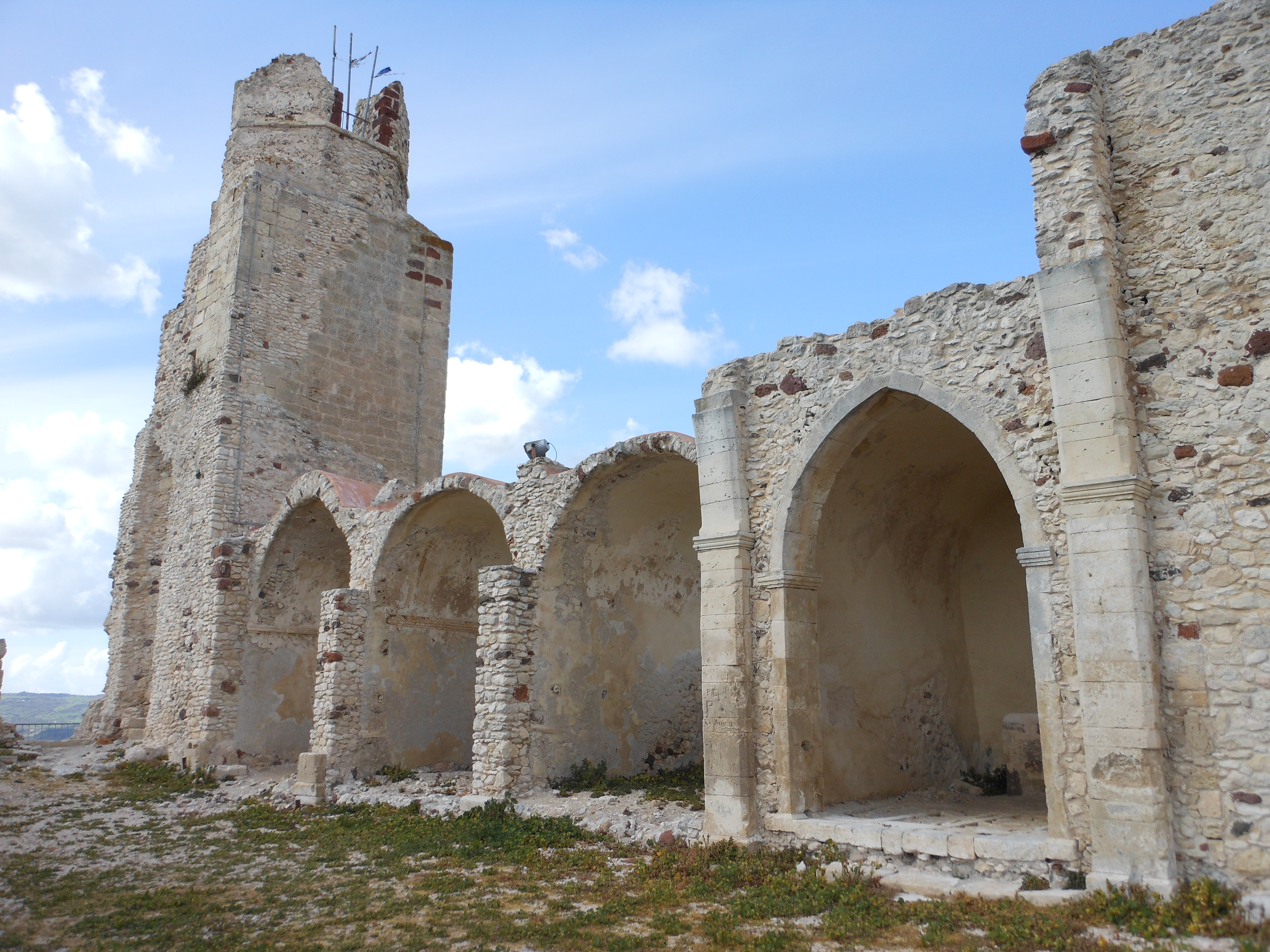
Castle of Chiaramonti

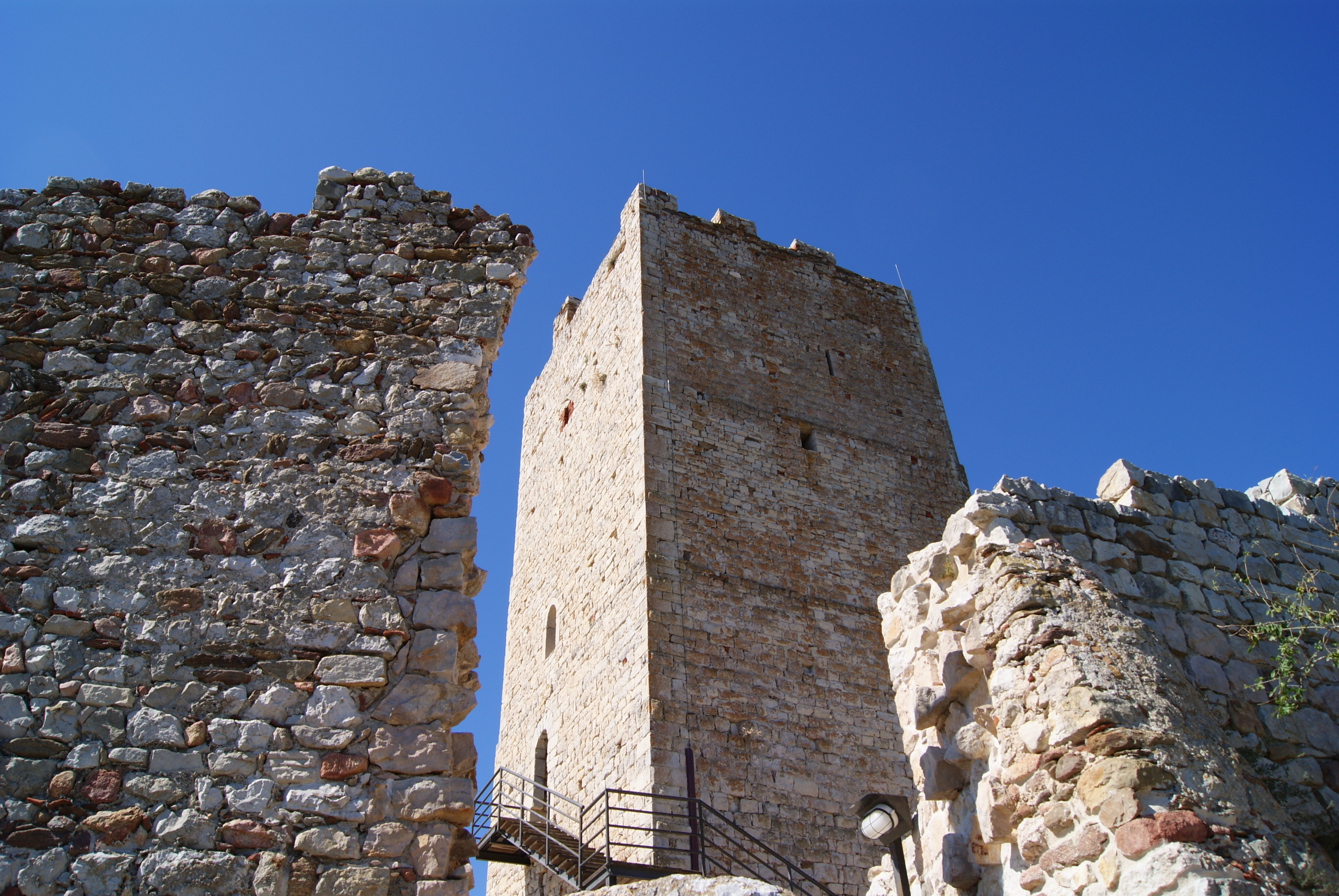
Castle della Fava, Posada

Between extant and gone, there are 82 castles in Sardinia, all built during the Middle Ages. Some date back to the Byzantine period, but most of them were built during the Judicate period and della Gherardesca, Malaspina and Doria rule, especially from the second half of the 13th century onwards.

Built mainly for strategic military purposes, they had the function of guarding the judicial borders and the most important communication routes. With the unification of Sardinia under the Aragonese their importance faded away and over time almost all of them fell into ruin.

== List ==
No.	name	comune	province	judicate	curatoria	date/period	condition
1	Castle of Acquafredda	Siliqua	Sud Sardegna	Cagliari	Sigerro	13th century	in ruins
2	Castle of Arcuentu	Arbus	Sud Sardegna	Arborea	Monreale	11th century	in ruins
3	Castle of Ardara	Ardara	Sassari	Torres	Oppia	11th century	ruins of one tower
4	Castle of Balariana	Luogosanto	Sassari	Gallura	Gallura	11th century	some ruins
5	Castle of Baratuli	Monastir	Sud Sardegna	Cagliari	Dolia	after 1258	in ruins
6	Castle of Barumele	Ales	Oristano	Arborea	Usellus	Byzantine period	in ruins
7	Castle of Bonvehì (or Bonuighinu)	Mara	Sassari	Torres	Cabudabbas	probably 12th century	ruins of one tower
8	Castle of Bulzi	Bulzi	Sassari	Torres	Anglona	12th century	some ruins
9	Castle of Capu Abbas (o Civita)	Olbia	Sassari	Gallura	Fundimonte	13th century	in ruin
10	Castle of Capula	Siligo	Sassari	Torres	Meilogu	13th century	few ruins
11	Castle of Casa di Regno (Mar'e Pontis)	Cabras	Oristano	Arborea	Campidano Maggiore	late Byzantine	few traces
12	Castle ofi Casteddu Etzu	Fordongianus	Oristano	Arborea	Barigadu	Byzantine	few ruins
13	Castle of Castel Pisano	unknown	Sassari	Torres	Nurra	unknown	completely gone
14	Castle of Castel Rosso	Perfugas	Sassari	Torres	Anglona	12th century	completely gone
15	Castle of Casteldoria	Santa Maria Coghinas	Sassari	Torres	Anglona	12th century	ruins of the walls and a tower
16	Castle of Castro	Oschiri	Sassari	Torres	Montacuto	Byzantine	ruins
17	Castle of Castrum Sulcitanum	Sant'Antioco	Sud Sardegna	Cagliari	Sulcis	Byzantine	completely gone
18	Castle of Cheremule	Cheremule	Sassari	Torres	Cabudabbas	Judicate	ruins
19	Castle of Chiaramonti	Chiaramonti	Sassari	Torres	Anglona	13th century	ruins
20	Castle Corallo	Gavoi	Nuoro	Arborea	Barbagia di Ollolai	Judicate	some ruins
21	Castle of Crasta	Monti	Sassari	Torres	Montacuto	Judicate	few ruins
22	Castle of Cugato	Oschiri	Sassari	Torres	Monteacuto	unknown	completely gone
23	Castle of Erguri	Buddusò	Sassari	Torres	Montacuto	Judicate	completely gone
24	Castle of Essola	unknown	Sassari	Torres	Nurra	probably Judicate	completely gone
25	Castle of Fava	Posada	Nuoro	Gallura	Posada	Judicate	good condition
26	Castle of Figulinas	Florinas	Sassari	Torres	Figulinas	very ancient	completely gone
27	Castle of Funtana Menta	Senis	Oristano	Arborea	Parte Valenza	Judicate	one tower in good condition
28	Castle of Ghilarza	Ghilarza	Oristano	Arborea	Guilcer	15th century	very good
29	Castle of Gioiosa Guardia	Villamassargia	Sud Sardegna	Cagliari	Sigerro	probably Judicate	ruins
30	Castle of Girapala	Paulilatino	Oristano	Arborea	Guilcier	Judicate	completely gone
31	Castle of Goceano (Castle of Burgos)	Burgos	Sassari	Torres	Goceano	1127–1129	walls and a tower
32	Castle of Gulana	Olzai	Nuoro	Arborea	Barbagia di Ollolai	unknown	completely gone
33	Castle of Laconi	Laconi	Oristano	Arborea	ParteValenza	probably Byzantine	ruins
34	Castle of Longonsardo	Santa Teresa Gallura	Sassari	Gallura	Taras	14th century	few ruins
35	Castle of Osilo (o dei Malaspina)	Osilo	Sassari	Torres	Montes	13th century	a portion in good condition
36	Castle of Malvicino	Villaputzu	Sud Sardegna	Cagliari	Sarrabus	13th century	ruins
37	Castle of Marmilla	Las Plassas	Sud Sardegna	Arborea	Arborea	from the 10th century	perimeter walls
38	Castle of Medusa	Asuni	Oristano	Arborea	Mandrolisai	Judicate	ruins
39	Castello dell'Asinara	Porto Torres	Sassari	Torres	Nurra	probably 16th century	scarce
40	Castle of Mondragone	Porto Torres	Sassari	Torres	Nurra	undetermined	completely gone
41	Castle of Monreale	Sardara	Sud Sardegna	Arborea	Bonorcili	13th century	perimeter walls
42	Castle of Montacuto	Berchidda	Sassari	Torres	Monteacuto	probably 11th century	ruins
43	Castle of Monteforte	Sassari	Sassari	Torres	Nurra	Judicate	few ruins
44	Castle of Monteleone	Monteleone Rocca Doria	Sassari	Torres	Monteleone	13th century	few ruins
45	Castle of Montesanto	Mores	Sassari	Torres	Oppia	13th century	completely gone
46	Castle of Montezuighe	Ittireddu	Sassari	Torres	Montacuto	late 13th century	few ruins
47	Castle of Montiferru (CastedduEzzu)	Cuglieri	Oristano	Torres	Montiferru	11th century	remains of perimeter walls and a tower
48	Castle of Murgunulis	Usellus	Oristano	Arborea	Parte Usellus	uncertain	completely gone
49	Castle of Narbolia	Narbolia	Oristano	Arborea	Campidano di Milis	Judicate	completely gone
50	Castle of Nora	Pula	Sud Sardegna	Cagliari	Nora	Byzantine	completely gone
51	Castle of Ogliastra	Lotzorai	Nuoro	Cagliari	Ogliastra	Judicate	partially in ruins
52	Castle of Oliena	Oliena	Nuoro	Gallura	Orosei	probably 11th century	completely gone
53	Castle of Olomene	Pattada	Sassari	Torres	Montacuto	various periods	numerous ruins
54	Castle of Olova	Luras	Sassari	Gallura	Gemini	Judicate	few ruins
55	Castle of Orisetto (Barigadu)	Neoneli	Oristano	Arborea	Barigadu	Byzantine	few ruins
56	Castle of Oristano	Oristano	Oristano	Arborea		Judicate	completely gone
57	Castle of Orosei	Orosei	Nuoro	Gallura	Gallura	Judicate	keep intact
58	Castle of Orvei	Tula	Sassari	Gallura	Montacuto	Judicate	ruins of a few buildings
59	Castle of Ozula (Palattu ezzu)	Sennori	Sassari	Torres	Romangia	undetermined	façade and courtyard verified
60	Castle of Padulaccia	Telti	Sassari	Gallura	Fundimonte	probably Byzantine	ruins of the walls
61	Castle of Palmas	San Giovanni Suergiu	Sud Sardegna	Cagliari	Sols	Judicate	one tower in poor condition
62	Castle of Pedres	Olbia	Sassari	Gallura	Fundimonte	13th century	ruins of the walls and a few towers
63	Castle of Pontes	Galtellì	Nuoro	Gallura	Galtellì	12th century	parts of the walls and a tower
64	Castle of Quirra	Villaputzu	Sud Sardegna	Cagliari	Quirra	Judicate	few ruins
65	Castle of Re Baldo	Luogosanto	Sassari	Gallura	Balariana	11th century	significant ruins
66	Castle of Roccaforte	Giave	Sassari	Torres	Caputabbas	14th century	completely gone
67	Castello della Rosa	Jerzu	Nuoro	Cagliari	Ogliastra	11th century	few ruins
68	Castle of Salvaterra	Iglesias	Sud Sardegna	Cagliari	Cixerri	13th century	few ruins
69	Castle of San Michele	Cagliari	Cagliari	Cagliari	Campidano di Cagliari	Judicate	good condition
70	Castle of Sanluri	Sanluri	Sud Sardegna	Cagliari	Nuraminis	11th century	good condition
71	Castle of Sant'Isidoro	Teulada	Sud Sardegna	Cagliari	Sols	Byzantine	few ruins
72	Castle of Santisconata	Domus de Maria	Sud Sardegna	Cagliari	Nora	unknown	few ruins
73	Castle of Sa Prisoni Bezza	Macomer	Nuoro	Torres	Marghine	12th century	completely gone
74	Castle of Sassai (o di Orguglioso)	Silius	Sud Sardegna	Cagliari	Gerrei	Judicate	good condition
75	Castle of Sassari	Sassari	Sassari	Torres	Romangia	14th century	completely gone
76	Castle of Segariu	Segariu	Sud Sardegna	Cagliari	Trexenta	12th century	few ruins
77	Castle of Serla	Norbello	Oristano	Arborea	Guilcier	Judicate	completely gone
78	Castle of Serravalle	Bosa	Oristano	Torres	Planargia	12th century	good condition
79	Castle of Sorra (Sorres)	Torralba	Sassari	Torres	Meilogu	14th century	completely gone
80	Castle of Tissilo	Ussassai	Nuoro	Cagliari	Barbagia di Seulo	undetermined	few ruins
81	Castle of Tului	Tratalias	Sud Sardegna	Cagliari	Sols	Judicate	completely gone
82	Castle of Uras	Uras	Oristano	Arborea	Bonorzuli	unknown	completely gone
83	Castle of Villasor	Villasor	Sud Sardegna	Cagliari	Gippi	15th century	good condition

== Bibliography ==
- Francesco Floris, ed. (2007). Enciclopedia della Sardegna. Sassari: Newton&Compton editore.
