= Regiment "Cavalleggeri di Sardegna" =

Inactive Italian Army cavalry unit

- Reggimento "Cavalleggeri di Sardegna"
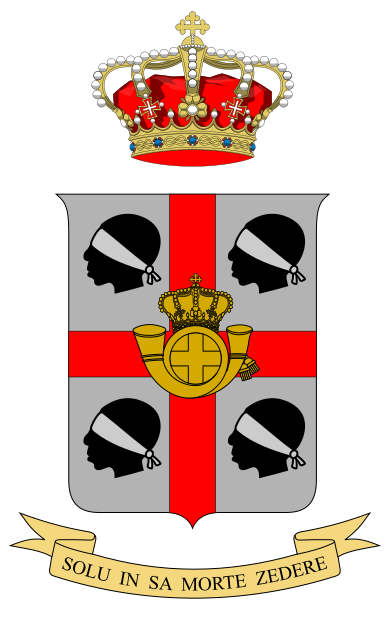
- Regimental coat of arms
- Active: 3 Jan. 1726 — 2 June 1819; 3 March 1832 — 21 April 1853; Dec. 1914 — 21 Nov. 1919; 10 Sept. 1936 — 5 Dec. 1944
- Country: Kingdom of Italy
- Branch: Royal Italian Army
- Garrison/HQ: Cagliari
- Motto: "Solo in sa morte zedere"
- Anniversaries: 7 July 1918 – Battle of Fier
- Decorations: 1× Silver Medal of Military Valor

Insignia
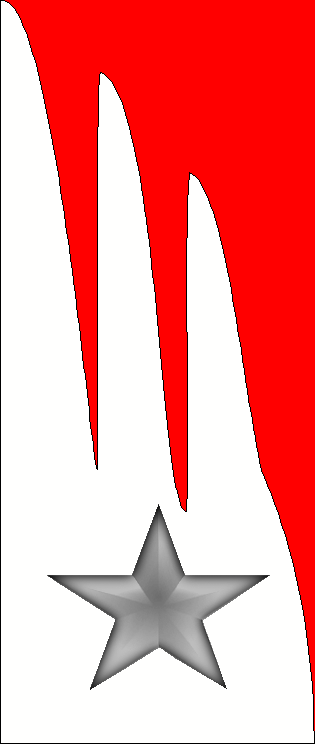
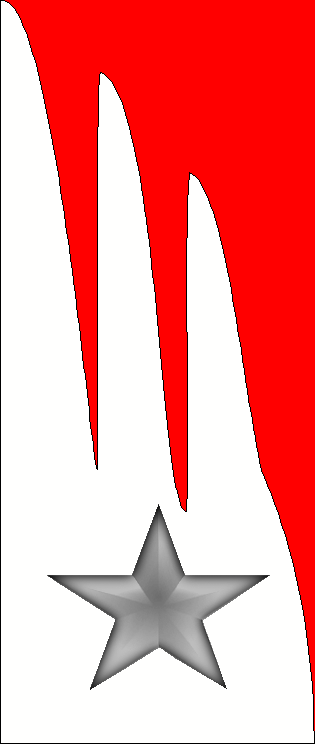
- Regimental gorget patches

The Regiment "Cavalleggeri di Sardegna" (Italian: Reggimento "Cavalleggeri di Sardegna" – "Chevau-légers of Sardinia") is an inactive cavalry unit of the Italian Army named for the island of Sardinia. In 1726, the Royal Sardinian Army formed the Dragoons of Sardinia, which were tasked with maintaining public order on the recently acquired island of Sardinia. In 1776, the unit was renamed Corps of Light Dragoons of Sardinia and in 1808, during the exile of King Victor Emmanuel I on the island, the corps was renamed Regiment "Cavalleggeri di Sardegna" (Regiment "Chevau-légers of Sardinia"). In 1819, the regiment was merged with the Corps of Musketeers of Sardinia to form the Corps of Royal Hunters of Sardinia. In 1822, the corps was disbanded and its personnel transferred to the Royal Carabinieri Corps of Sardinia. Due to the sharp increase of brigandage on Sardinia, the Regiment "Cavalleggeri di Sardegna" was reformed in 1832. In 1853, the regiment was once more disbanded and its personnel transferred to the Royal Carabinieri Corps of Sardinia. In December 1914, shortly before Italy's entry into World War I, the Royal Italian Army formed the X Sardinian Group in Ozieri, which consisted of two squadrons recruited on the island. In October 1915, the X Sardinian Group was disbanded and the remaining personnel assigned to the 19th Sardinian Squadron, which was sent to the Albanian front. In April 1916, the 19th Sardinian Squadron was attached to the Regiment "Cavalleggeri di Lodi" (15th), with which the squadron served until the end of the war. After the end of the war, the 19th Sardinian Squadron was disbanded.

In 1936, the Squadron "Cavalleggeri di Sardegna" was formed in Cagliari with Sardinian personnel. The squadron received the name of the Regiment "Cavalleggeri di Sardegna" and the traditions of the 19th Sardinian Squadron. In spring 1940, the squadron was expanded to III Squadrons Group "Cavalleggeri di Sardegna". Initially the squadrons group was assigned to the 30th Infantry Division "Sabauda" and then in June 1943 to the 184th Infantry Division "Nembo". In September 1943, the squadrons group was transferred to the XXXIII Coastal Brigade and in March 1944, to the 47th Infantry Division "Bari". On 5 December 1944, the Squadrons Group "Cavalleggeri di Sardegna" was disbanded. The unit's anniversary falls on 7 July 1918, the day the 19th Sardinian Squadron distinguished itself in the Battle of Fier in Albania, for which it was awarded a Silver Medal of Military Valor. As the regiment is a Chevau-léger unit, its enlisted personnel is addressed as "Chevau-léger" (Italian: Cavalleggero).

== History ==
In 1701, the Duke of Savoy Victor Amadeus II joined the War of the Spanish Succession. The war ended in 1713 with the Peace of Utrecht, which transferred the Kingdom of Sicily and parts of the Duchy of Milan to Savoy. In October 1713, Victor Amadeus II and his wife, Anne Marie d'Orléans, travelled from Nice to Palermo, where, on 24 December 1713, they were crowned in the cathedral of Palermo King and Queen of Sicily. On 1 July 1718, Spain landed troops on Sicily and tried to recover the Kingdom of Sicily from Savoy rule. On 2 August 1718, Britain, France, Austria, and Savoy formed an alliance to defeat Spain in the War of the Quadruple Alliance. The war ended in 1720 with the Treaty of The Hague, which restored the position prior to 1717, but with Savoy and the Austria exchanging the Kingdom of Sardinia and the Kingdom of Sicily.

Initially, King Victor Amadeus II sent the Cavalry Regiment "Piemonte Reale", the Royal Fusiliers Regiment, the Regiment of "Savoia", the Regiment of "Saluzzo", and a Swiss mercenary regiment to garrison the island of Sardinia. On 3 January 1726, the Royal Sardinian Army formed three dragoon companies in Pinerolo in Piedmont, whose personnel was recruited among the veterans of the army's five cavalry regiments. The new unit, which fielded 560 men, was named Dragoons of Sardinia (Italian: Dragoni di Sardegna) and in June of the same year sent to Sardinia, where the companies were dispatched to Sassari, Nuoro, and Oristano, while the unit's headquarter was established in Cagliari. The three companies were further divided into smaller detachments and patrols, which were tasked with fighting brigands and upholding the King's authority in rural Sardinia.

By 1750, the Dragoons of Sardinia maintained detachments in Tempio, Nulvi, Ozieri, Padria, Chiaramonti, Bono, Bortigali, Bolotana, Orosei, and Isili. On 21 September 1764, the Dragoons of Sardinia were reduced to two companies. In 1776, the Dragoons of Sardinia were renamed Corps of Light Dragoons of Sardinia (Italian: Corpo dei Dragoni Leggeri di Sardegna). In 1778, the corps formed two new companies, and the corps' four companies were grouped into two squadrons.

=== French Revolutionary Wars ===
On 21 September 1792, French forces invaded the Duchy of Savoy and on 29 September the County of Nice. Due to these unprovoked attacks King Victor Amadeus III joined the War of the First Coalition against the French Republic. On 11 February 1793, 1,200 French soldiers landed on Sardinia at Quartu Sant'Elena. The French then advanced westwards towards Cagliari, but they were driven back by the squadrons of the Light Dragoons of Sardinia. On 3 February 1795, both squadrons were transferred to Piedmont, where they fought against the French. In March 1796, Napoleon Bonaparte arrived in Italy and took command of the French forces, with which he defeated the Royal Sardinian Army in the Montenotte campaign within a month. After the defeat in the Montenotte campaign King Victor Amadeus III was forced to sign the Treaty of Paris, which ceded the Duchy of Savoy and the County of Nice to France and gave the French Revolutionary Army free passage through the Kingdom of Sardinia towards the rest of Italy. The Treaty of Paris also imposed a limit of 10,000 troops on the Royal Sardinian Army, which was forced disband three of its cavalry units located at the time in Piedmont: the Cavalry Regiment "Aosta", the Regiment "Dragoni del Chiablese", and the two squadrons of the Corps of Light Dragoons of Sardinia. On 26 October 1796, the two squadrons were disbanded and the four Light Dragoons of Sardinia companies were transferred to other regiments: the 1st Company to the Regiment "Dragoni di Sua Maestà", the 2nd Company to the Regiment "Cavalleggeri di Sua Maestà", the 3rd Company to the Regiment "Dragoni di Piemonte", and the 4th Company to the Regiment "Dragoni della Regina". However soon thereafter much of the personnel returned to Sardinia, where the four companies of the Corps of Light Dragoons of Sardinia were reformed.

On 29 November 1798, the War of the Second Coalition began and French forces invaded Piedmont. Already on 6 December 1798, the French occupied Turin and took King Charles Emmanuel IV prisoner. On 8 December 1798, the King was forced to sign a document of abdication, which also ordered his former subjects to recognise French laws and his troops to obey the orders of the French Revolutionary Army. Afterwards, King Charles Emmanuel IV was released and went into exile on the island Sardinia, while his former territories became the French controlled Piedmontese Republic. On 9 December 1798, the Sardinian troops were released from their oath of allegiance to the King and sworn to the Piedmontese Republic. The only exceptions were the Regiment of Sardinia and the Corps of Light Dragoons of Sardinia, which were both based in Sardinia and thus out of reach of the French Army.

On 21 January 1800, the Corps of Light Dragoons of Sardinia was expanded to six companies, which were grouped into three squadrons. On 4 June 1802, King Charles Emmanuel IV abdicated in favor of his brother Victor Emmanuel I. On 13 October 1808, the Corps of Light Dragoons of Sardinia was renamed Regiment "Cavalleggeri di Sardegna" (Regiment "Chevau-légers of Sardinia"). The regiment consisted of six squadrons and fielded 538 men and 530 horses. In 1812, the regiment was reduced to 390 men, with 65 men per squadron. In November 1814, the six squadrons were grouped into three divisions. On 11 April 1814, Napoleon abdicated and one month later, on 20 May 1814, King Victor Emmanuel I returned from exile in Sardinia to Turin. On 13 June 1814, one of the regiment's division was sent to Piedmont as the first cavalry unit of the reformed Royal Sardinian Army.

=== Restauration ===
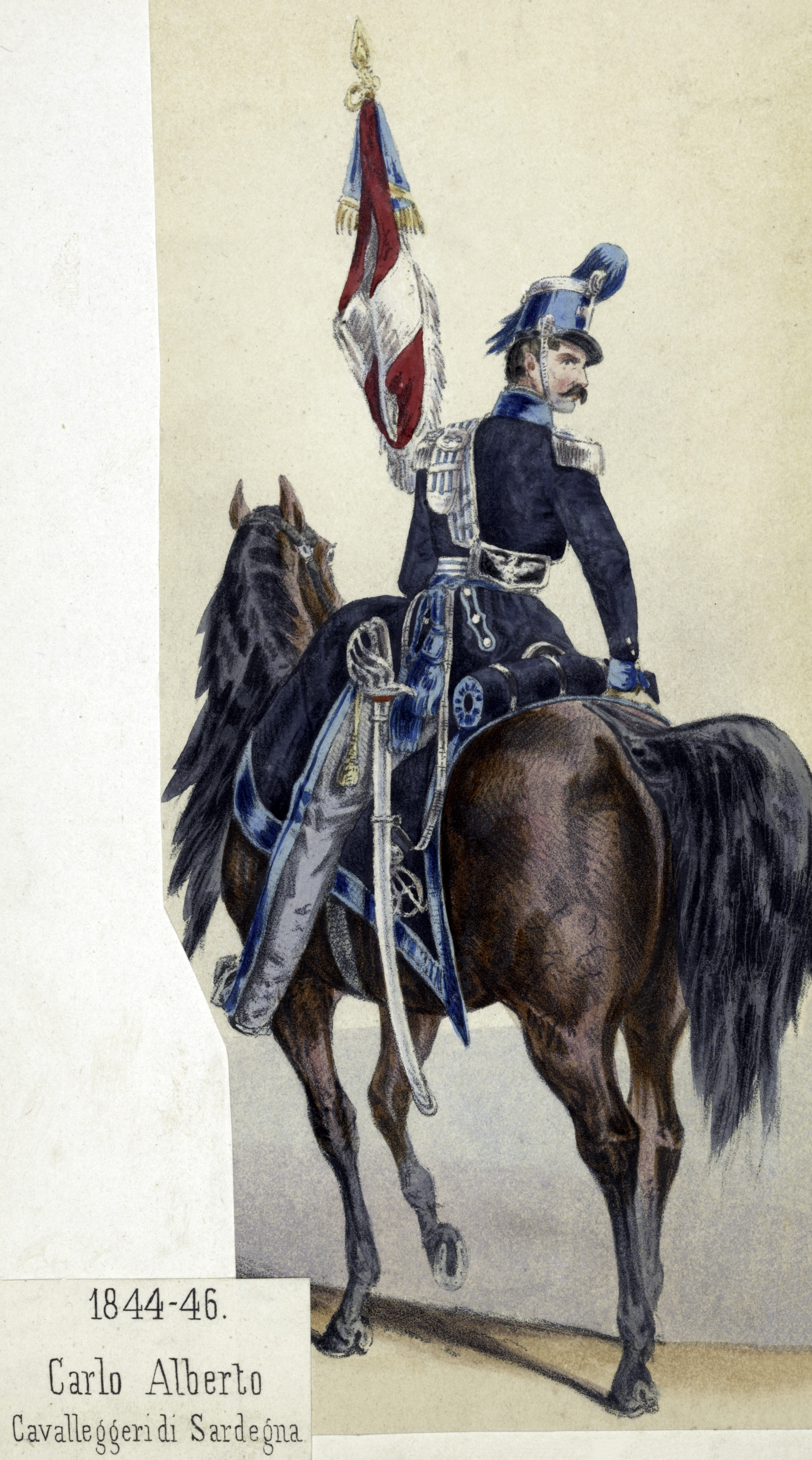
Regiment "Cavalleggeri di Sardegna" standard-bearer in the regiment's uniform 1844–46

In 1818, the Piemontese government decided to disband the Royal Genoese Gendarmerie, which had maintained public order in the annexed Republic of Genoa, and assign the task to maintain public order in Genoa to the Royal Carabinieri Corps. On 4 July 1818, the Royal Genoese Gendarmerie was disbanded and its personnel used to form the Corps of Musketeers of Sardinia (Italian: Corpo dei Moschettiere di Sardegna). The corps consisted of three companies and was sent to Sardinia to maintain public order on the island. On 2 June 1819, the Regiment "Cavalleggeri di Sardegna" and the Corps of Musketeers of Sardinia were merged to form the Corps of Royal Hunters of Sardinia (Italian: Corpo dei Cacciatori Reali di Sardegna). The corps, which consisted of a staff, four companies on foot, and four companies on horse, fielded 24 officers and 677 troops.

On 16 October 1822, King Charles Felix decreed to form the Royal Carabinieri Corps of Sardinia, which would incorporate the personnel of the Corps of Royal Hunters of Sardinia. On 1 April 1823, two Royal Carabinieri divisions were formed in Cagliari and Sassari with the personnel of the Corps of Royal Hunters of Sardinia, which was disbanded on the same day. The Royal Carabinieri Corps of Sardinia fielded 425 Carabinieri on horse and 100 Carabinieri on foot.

Due to a sharp increase of brigandage on Sardinia, King Charles Albert ordered on 3 March 1832 to reform the Regiment "Cavalleggeri di Sardegna". The reformed regiment incorporated the personnel of the Royal Carabinieri Corps of Sardinia and then consisted of two divisions, which fielded four squadrons, which were further divided into 13 detachments and 60 posts distributed across the island. The regiment's staff consisted of seven officers, two surgeons, one veterinaria, and 49 non-commissioned officers and soldiers. Each of the regiment's four squadrons consisted of four officers, 25 non-commissioned officers, 65 chevau-légers, and some 40 men on foot. The regiment's posts were as follows:

- Regiment "Cavalleggeri di Sardegna", in Cagliari
  - I Division, in Cagliari
    - 1st Squadron
      - with detachments in Cagliari, Iglesias, and Oristano
      - with posts in Cagliari, Iglesias, Selargius, San Pantaleo, Senorbì, Monastir, Sanluri, Siliqua, Sant'Antioco, and Villacidro
    - 2nd Squadron
      - with detachments in Laconi, Busachi, and Lanusei
      - with posts in Laconi, Busachi, Lanusei, Isili, Mandas, Nurri, Sini, Pauli Gerrei, Sorgono, Meana, Ghilarza, Villagrande Strisaili, Urzulei, and Aritzo
  - II Division, in Sassari
    - 3rd Squadron
      - with detachments in Sassari, Tempio, Ozieri, and Macomer
      - with posts in Sassari, Ozieri, Macomer, Alghero, Villanova Monteleone, Ittiri, Torralba, Nulvi, Sedini, Chiaramonti, Ploaghe, Thiesi, Bortigiadas, Calangianus, Terranova, Mores, Pattada, Buddusò, Berchidda, Monti, Pozzomaggiore, Bonorva, Santu Lussurgiu, and Cuglieri
    - 4th Squadron
      - with detachments in Nuoro, Dorgali, and Bono
      - with posts in Nuoro, Dorgali, Bono, Fonni, Orgosolo, Orosei, Gavoi, Bitti, Siniscola, Bolotana, Ottana, and Orotelli

On 21 April 1853, the Regiment "Cavalleggeri di Sardegna" was once more disbanded and its personnel used to reform the Royal Carabinieri Corps of Sardinia. The reformed corps, which continued to use the uniforms of the Regiment "Cavalleggeri di Sardegna", fielded 32 officers, 480 non-commissioned officers and soldiers on horse, 20 recruits on horse, 308 non-commissioned officers and soldiers on foot, 15 recruits on foot, and 480 horses. The corps consisted of a staff in Cagliari and two divisions, which fielded six companies and twelve lieutenancies that oversaw 114 stations. One division was based in Sassari, with its companies in Sassari, Alghero, and Nuoro, while the other division was based in Cagliari, with its companies based in Cagliari and Isili. One of the companies in Cagliari was responsible for the city of Cagliari, while the other was tasked maintaining public order in the rural areas around Cagliari. The lieutenancies were based in Iglesias, San Pantaleo, Sanluri, Oristano, Lanusei, Sorgono, Cuglieri, Tempio, Ozieri, Bono, Nulvi, and Dorgali.

In 1859, the Kingdom of Sardinia and the French Empire fought the Second Italian War of Independence against the Austrian Empire. The war concluded with the transfer of Lombardy from the Austrian Empire to the French Empire, which in turn ceded Lombardy to the Kingdom of Sardinia. During the war Sardinian forces also occupied the Duchy of Modena and Reggio, Duchy of Parma and Piacenza, Grand Duchy of Tuscany, and the Papal Legations, which were annexed by Sardinia on 18 March 1860. In May of the same year Giuseppe Garibaldi's Expedition of the Thousand landed in Sicily, which led to the annexation of the Kingdom of the Two Sicilies on 27 January 1861. Three days earlier, on 24 January 1861, King Victor Emmanuel II ordered that the Royal Carabinieri Corps of Sardinia should be merged into the Royal Carabinieri Corps. On 17 March of the same year, King Victor Emmanuel II proclaimed himself King of Italy. On 16 August 1861, the Royal Carabinieri Corps of Sardinia was disbanded and its personnel formed the 3rd Carabinieri Legion, which on 28 July 1867 was renamed Carabinieri Legion of Cagliari. In 1909, the Carabinieri Legion of Cagliari was assigned the traditions of the Regiment "Cavalleggeri di Sardegna".

=== World War I ===
After the outbreak of World War I, the Royal Italian Army formed in December 1914 new cavalry units, including the X Sardinian Group in Ozieri in Sardinia. The group consisted of the 19th Squadron and 20th Squadron, which were both manned by personnel recruited on the island. In October 1915, all new cavalry groups were disbanded, with the exception of the 19th Sardinian Squadron, which was sent to the Principality of Albania, where the Italian XVI Corps established a front along the Vjosa river in southern Albania to protect the important port of Vlorë from the Austro-Hungarian Army, which had occupied the rest of Albania. In April 1916, the 19th Sardinian Squadron was attached to the Regiment "Cavalleggeri di Lodi" (15th).

The front in southern Albania remained static until July 1918, when the Italian forces went on the offensive to push the Austro-Hungarian troops beyond the Seman river. On 7 July 1918, the 15th Infantry Regiment and 16th Infantry Regiment of the Brigade "Savona", the Regiment "Cavalleggeri di Catania" (22nd), the I Group of the Regiment "Cavalleggeri di Palermo" (30th), and the 19th Sardinian Squadron, crossed the Vjosa river and attacked towards Mallakastër and Fier. On 7 July 1918, the 19th Sardinian Squadron charged the Austro-Hungarian airfield at Fier, where the squadron's chevau-légers shot down an airplane with their carabines, captured six airplanes on the ground, took over three hundred prisoners, and captured all the material in the camp. The offensive then continued and on 9 July Italian forces reached the Seman river. After a short break the Italian units fell back to the hills South of the river, where they defeated heavy Austro-Hungarian counterattacks on 22 and 25 August 1918.

On 15 September 1918, the Allied Army of the Orient began the Vardar offensive against the Imperial German Army and Bulgarian Army forces on the Macedonian front. On 29 September, Bulgaria signed the Armistice of Salonica and the next day at noon, the Bulgarian Army surrendered. With the Bulgarian surrender, the Austro-Hungarian position in Albania became untenable and consequently, in early October 1918, Italian units observed large fires along the entire Austro-Hungarian line. Italian patrols sent forward to reconnoiter, reported that the Austro-Hungarian forces had burned their supplies and fled Albania. Italian cavalry units were sent to pursue the fleeing Austro-Hungarians and the 19th Sardinian Squadron advanced to Durrës and Shkodër. For its conduct during the Italian offensive on the Seman river and for the capture of the airfield at Fier the 19th Sardinian Squadron was awarded a Silver Medal of Military Valor.

=== Interwar years ===
After the war's end the Royal Italian Army reduced its cavalry forces and on 21 November 1919, 14 cavalry regiments and the 19th Sardinian Squadron were disbanded. The traditions of the X Sardinian Group and the 19th Sardinian Squadron were assigned to the Regiment "Cavalleggeri di Lodi" (15th). On 1 July 1920, the Italian cavalry was reduced further and the Regiment "Cavalleggeri di Lodi" (15th) was disbanded. On the same day, the traditions of the X Sardinian Group and the 19th Sardinian Squadron were assigned to the Regiment "Lancieri di Firenze" (9th).

On 10 September 1936, the Royal Italian Army formed the Squadron "Cavalleggeri di Sardegna" in Cagliari with personnel recruited in Sardinia. The squadron consisted of a command, a command platoon, four cavalry platoons, and a machine gunners platoon. The squadron received the name of the Regiment "Cavalleggeri di Sardegna" and the traditions of the 19th Sardinian Squadron.

=== World War II ===
In spring 1940, the Squadron "Cavalleggeri di Sardegna" was expanded and mobilized as III Squadrons Group "Cavalleggeri di Sardegna". The squadrons group was attached to the 30th Infantry Division "Sabauda" and consisted of a command, a command unit, and three cavalry squadrons. In October 1940, the squadrons group added a connections platoon and a machine gunners platoon. In 1941, the group disbanded one of its cavalry squadrons. On 25 March 1942, the squadrons group was reorganized and consisted afterwards of a command, a command platoon, two cavalry squadrons, and a machine gunners squadrons. In February 1943, the command platoon was expanded to command unit and in spring of the same year the squadrons group reformed its 3rd Squadron. In June 1943, the squadrons group was attached to the 184th Infantry Division "Nembo".

In the evening of 8 September 1943, the Armistice of Cassibile, which ended hostilities between the Kingdom of Italy and the Anglo-American Allies, was announced by General Dwight D. Eisenhower on Radio Algiers and by Marshal Pietro Badoglio on Italian radio. Germany reacted by invading mainland Italy, while in Sardinia the German 90th Panzergrenadier Division retreated towards Corsica. On 10 September 1943, the squadrons group was attached to the XXXIII Coastal Brigade. In October 1943, the squadrons group disbanded its 3rd Squadron and joined the Italian Co-belligerent Army. On 15 March 1944, the squadrons group was assigned to the 47th Infantry Division "Bari". On 21 September 1944, the 47th Infantry Division "Bari" was disbanded and the squadrons group, which by then had been transferred most of its troops and horses to other units, was assigned to the Military Command of Sardinia. On 5 December 1944, the III Squadrons Group "Cavalleggeri di Sardegna" was disbanded.
