= Nulvi =

Nulvi Nùivi (Sardinian)
- Comune
- Comune di Nulvi
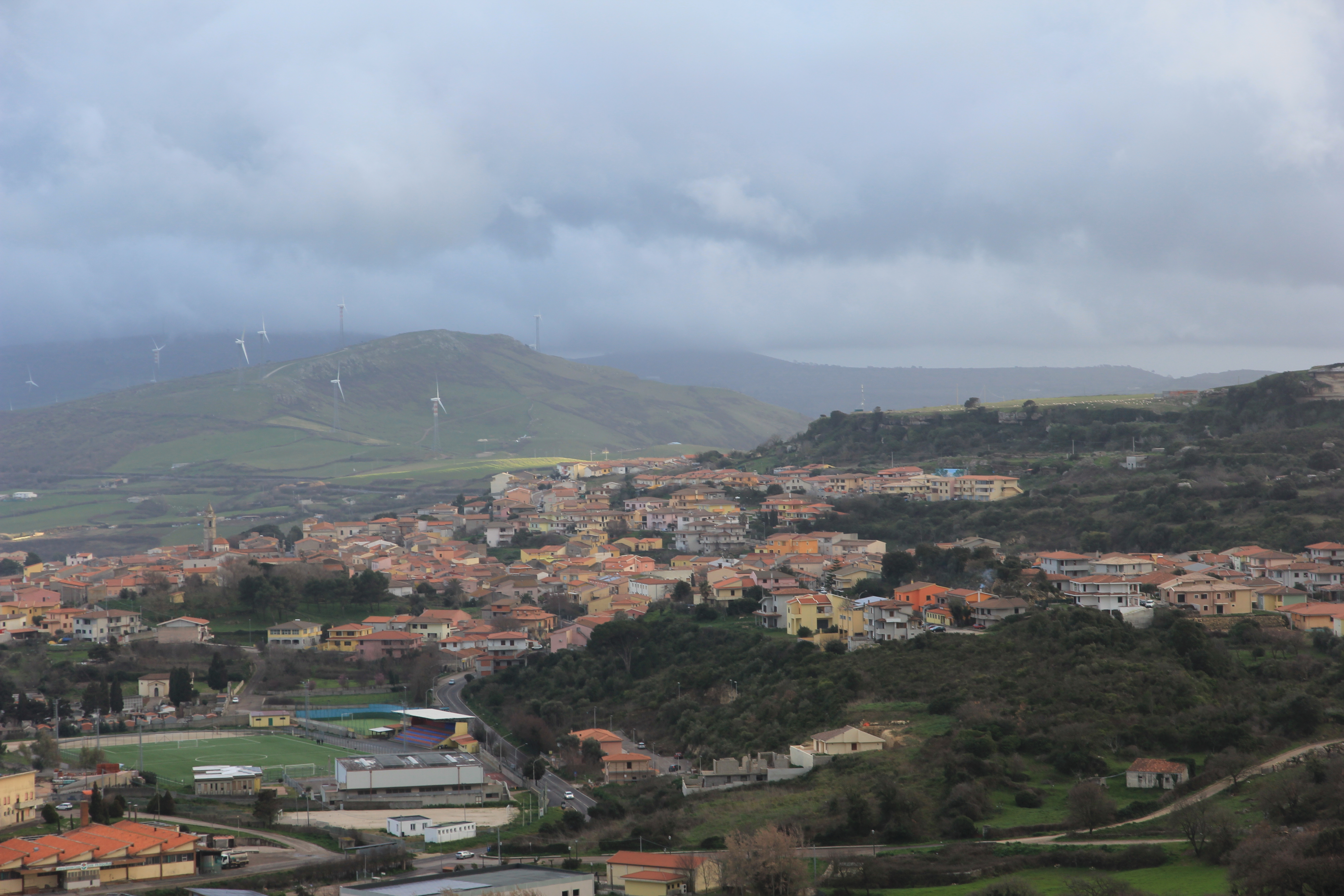
- View of Nulvi

- Location within Sardinia
- Coordinates: 40°47′N 8°45′E
- Country: Italy
- Region: Sardinia
- Metropolitan city: Sassari (SS)

Government
  - Mayor: Antonello Cubaiu

Area
  - Total: 67.38 km^{2} (26.02 sq mi)
- Elevation: 478 m (1,568 ft)

Population (2026)
  - Total: 2,572
  - Density: 38.17/km^{2} (98.86/sq mi)
- Demonym: Nulvesi
- Time zone: UTC+1 (CET)
  - Summer (DST): UTC+2 (CEST)
- Postal code: 07032
- Dialing code: 079
- Website: Official website

Nulvi (Sardinian: Nùivi) is a town and comune (municipality) in the Metropolitan City of Sassari in the autonomous island region of Sardinia in Italy, located about 180 kilometres (110 mi) north of Cagliari and about 20 kilometres (12 mi) northeast of Sassari. It is one of the main centers of the Anglona historical regione. It has 2,572 inhabitants.

Nulvi borders the municipalities of Chiaramonti, Laerru, Martis, Osilo, Ploaghe, Sedini, and Tergu.

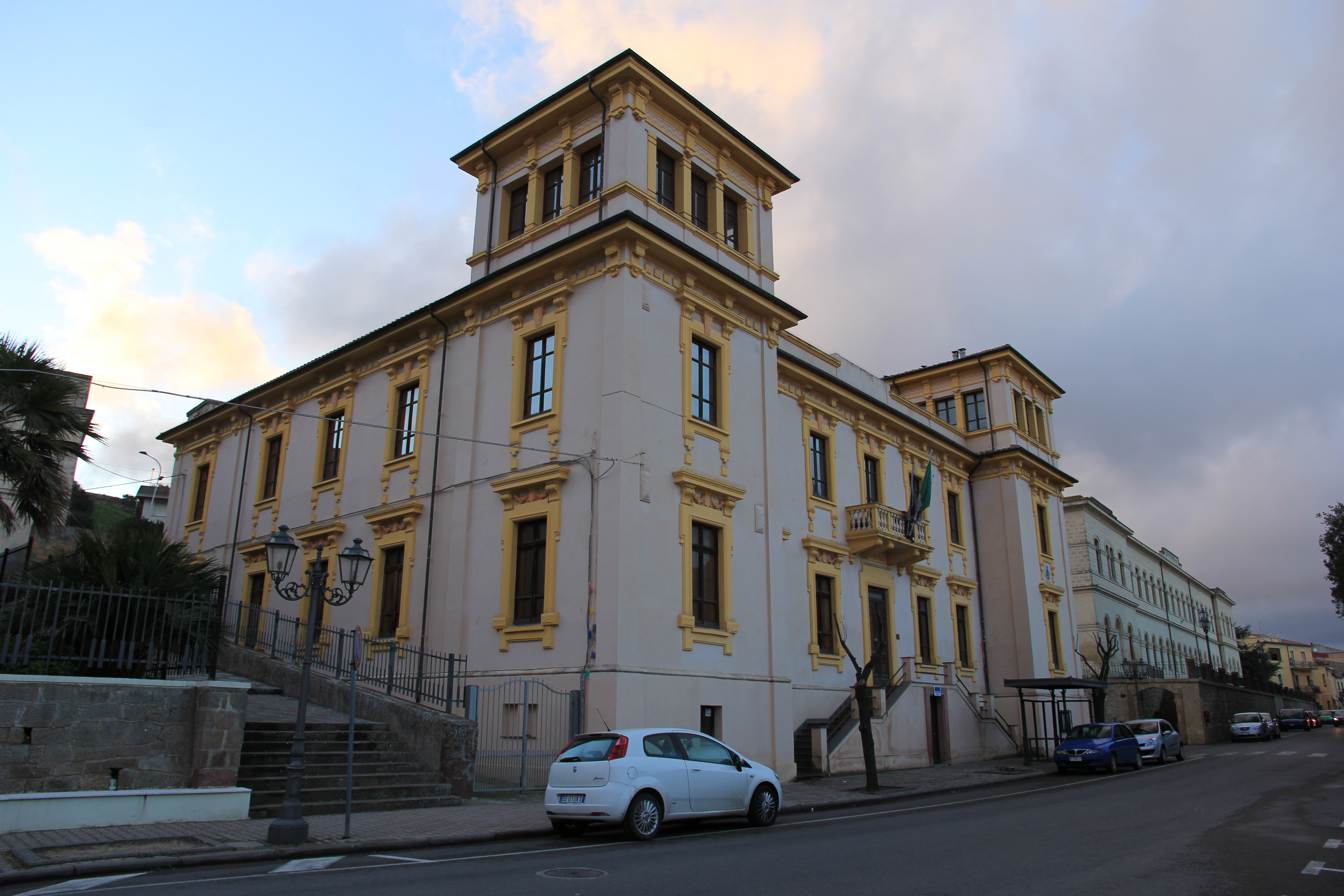
Town hall

== Demographics ==
As of 2026, the population is 2,572, of which 50.2% are males, and 49.8% are females. Minors make up 14.3% of the population, and seniors make up 26.4%.

Historical population

Year	Pop.	±%
1861	2,925	—
1871	3,236	+10.6%
1881	3,166	−2.2%
1901	3,616	+14.2%
1911	3,816	+5.5%
1921	3,649	−4.4%
1931	3,726	+2.1%
1936	3,791	+1.7%

Year	Pop.	±%
1951	4,066	+7.3%
1961	3,978	−2.2%
1971	3,449	−13.3%
1981	3,189	−7.5%
1991	3,078	−3.5%
2001	3,007	−2.3%
2011	2,851	−5.2%
2021	2,648	−7.1%

Source: ISTAT

=== Immigration ===
As of 2025, immigrants make up 3.4% of the population. The 5 largest foreign countries of birth are Germany, France, Argentina, Colombia, and the United Kingdom.
