= Sedini =

Sedini Séddini (Sardinian)
- Comune
- Comune di Sedini
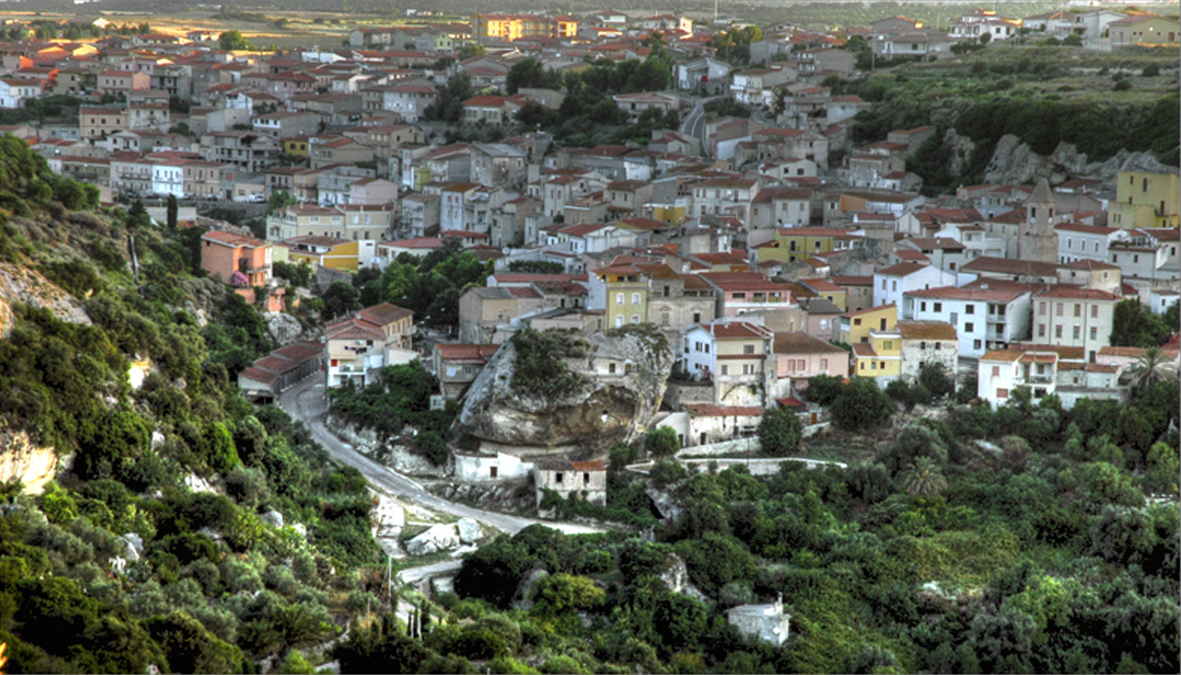
- View of Sedini

- Coat of arms

- Location within Sardinia
- Coordinates: 40°51′N 8°49′E
- Country: Italy
- Region: Sardinia
- Metropolitan city: Sassari (SS)
- Frazioni: Littigheddu

Government
  - Mayor: Salvatore Carta

Area
  - Total: 40.51 km^{2} (15.64 sq mi)
- Elevation: 350 m (1,150 ft)

Population (2026)
  - Total: 1,183
  - Density: 29.20/km^{2} (75.63/sq mi)
- Demonym: Sedinesi
- Time zone: UTC+1 (CET)
  - Summer (DST): UTC+2 (CEST)
- Postal code: 07035
- Dialing code: 079
- Website: Official website

Sedini (Sassarese: Séddini) is a town and comune (municipality) in the Metropolitan City of Sassari in the autonomous island region of Sardinia in Italy, located about 180 kilometres (110 mi) north of Cagliari and about 25 kilometres (16 mi) northeast of Sassari, in the traditional subregion of Anglona. It has 1,183 inhabitants.

Sedini borders the municipalities of Bulzi, Castelsardo, Laerru, Nulvi, Santa Maria Coghinas, Tergu, and Valledoria.

== Demographics ==
As of 2026, the population is 1,183, of which 48.4% are males, and 51.6% are females. Minors make up 11.6% of the population, and seniors make up 28.7%.

Historical population

Year	Pop.	±%
1861	1,064	—
1871	1,345	+26.4%
1881	1,458	+8.4%
1901	1,878	+28.8%
1911	1,675	−10.8%
1921	1,658	−1.0%
1931	1,946	+17.4%
1936	2,045	+5.1%

Year	Pop.	±%
1951	2,288	+11.9%
1961	2,186	−4.5%
1971	1,750	−19.9%
1981	1,542	−11.9%
1991	1,543	+0.1%
2001	1,461	−5.3%
2011	1,378	−5.7%
2021	1,256	−8.9%

Source: ISTAT

=== Immigration ===
As of 2025, immigrants make up 1.6% of the population. The 5 largest foreign countries of birth are Romania, Colombia, the Netherlands, Argentina, and the Democratic Republic of the Congo.

== Main sights ==
- Church of San Nicola di Silanis, built before 1122
