= San Nicola di Silanis =

Church building in Sedini, Italy

Church of San Nicola di Silanis San Nicola di Silanis (in Italian)
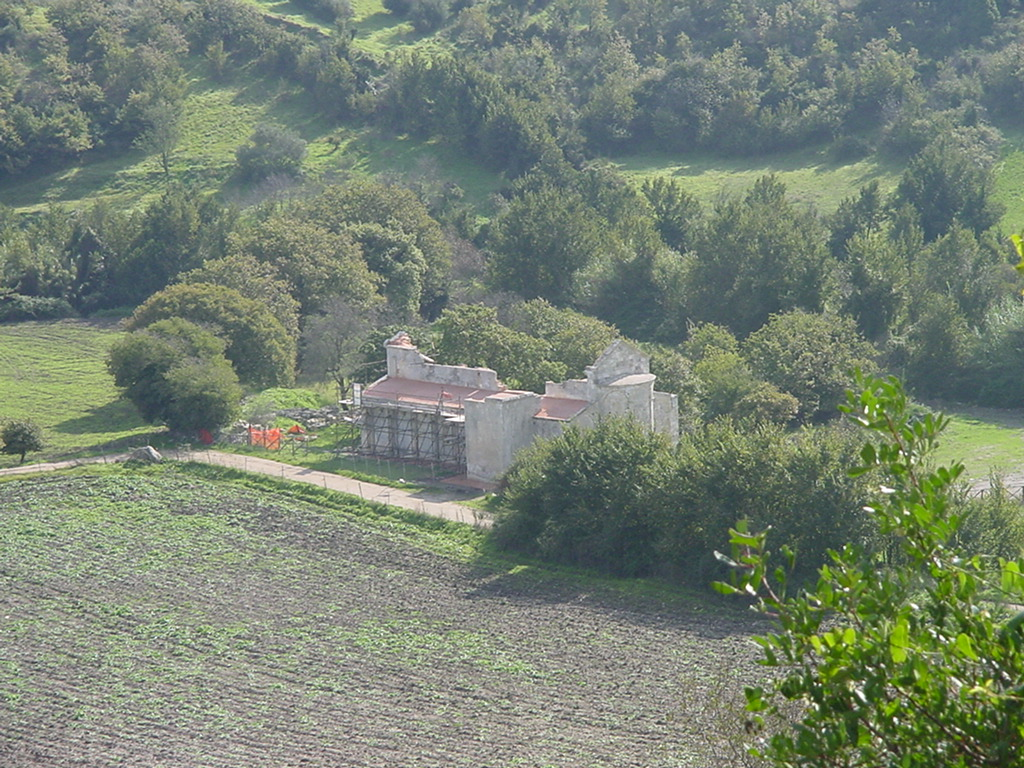
- View of the church

Religion
- Affiliation: Roman Catholic
- Province: Archdiose of Sassari
- Rite: Latin Rite
- Status: ruins

Location
- Location: Sedini, Italy
- Interactive map of Church of San Nicola di Silanis; San Nicola di Silanis (in Italian)
- Coordinates: 40°50′06″N 8°49′30″E

Architecture
- Type: Church
- Style: Romanesque
- Groundbreaking: 12th century

The Chiesa di San Nicola di Silanis (English: "Church of San Nicola di Silanis") is a church in a state of ruins in the comune of Sedini, northern Sardinia, Italy.

== History and description ==
The church was built before 1122, when it is mentioned in a deed of donation in favor of the abbey of Montecassino, by the spouses Furatu de Gitil and Susanna de Zori, whose names appear carved on the facade of the church. Its architecture, influenced by the Basilica of San Gavino in Porto Torres presents a synthesis between the First Romanesque and Pisan Romanesque ways: in particular there are several similarities with the cultural environment of Lucca at that time. This adhesion to that cultural model is also highlighted in the classical taste that emerges in the decorations of the capitals Corinthians on the facade and in the surviving column of the presbytery, and in particular in the pediment where, in the decorations of the frame, appear Egg-and-dart completely similar to those present in the canopy of the side portal of the church of Sant'Alessandro, Lucca.

== Bibliography ==
- Frank Pittui, "Fra i ruderi i frammenti di un sogno medievale. Note sulla chiesa di San Nicola di Silanos. Sedini", in L'almanacco gallurese 2004–2005.
- Aldo Sari, Un antico priorato cassinese in Anglona: S. Nicola di Solio, in “L'Anglona. Periodico politico-culturale della Comunità Montana n. 2, Anno IV, n. 1, maggio-giugno 2005.
- Frank Pittui, "Note sulle genealogie e la poetica della chiesa di San Nicola di Silanos. Sedini.", in Sacer, 12, 2005
- R. Coroneo, Architettura romanica dalla metà del Mille al primo ‘300, collana “Storia dell'arte in Sardegna”, Nuoro, Ilisso, 1993.
- Renata Serra, Sardegna Romanica, Jaca Book, Milano, 1988 ISBN 88-16-60096-9
- Silva R., La chiesa di Sant'Alessandro Maggiore in Lucca, Lucca, 1987
- Raffaello Delogu, L'architettura del medioevo in Sardegna, Roma, 1953 (ristampa anastatica, Sassari, 1992)
- I. Pellizzaro, La chiesa di San Nicola di Silanos e l'architettura romanica in Sardegna, Padova, 1936
