= Sassarese language =

Italo-Dalmatian language of Sardinia

Sassarese
- sassaresu, turritanu
- Pronunciation: [sasːaˈrezu]
- Native to: Italy
- Region: Sardinia
- Ethnicity: Sardinians and Corsicans of Sassari
- Native speakers: (100,000 cited 1999)
- Language family: Indo-European: Italic; Latino-Faliscan; Latin; Romance; Italo-Western; Italo-Dalmatian; Italo-Romance; Tuscan; Corsican; Sassarese
- Writing system: Latin (Italian alphabet)

Official status
- Recognised minority language in: Sardinia (Italy))

Language codes
- ISO 639-3: sdc
- Glottolog: sass1235
- ELP: Sassarese Sardinian
- Linguasphere: 51-AAA-pe
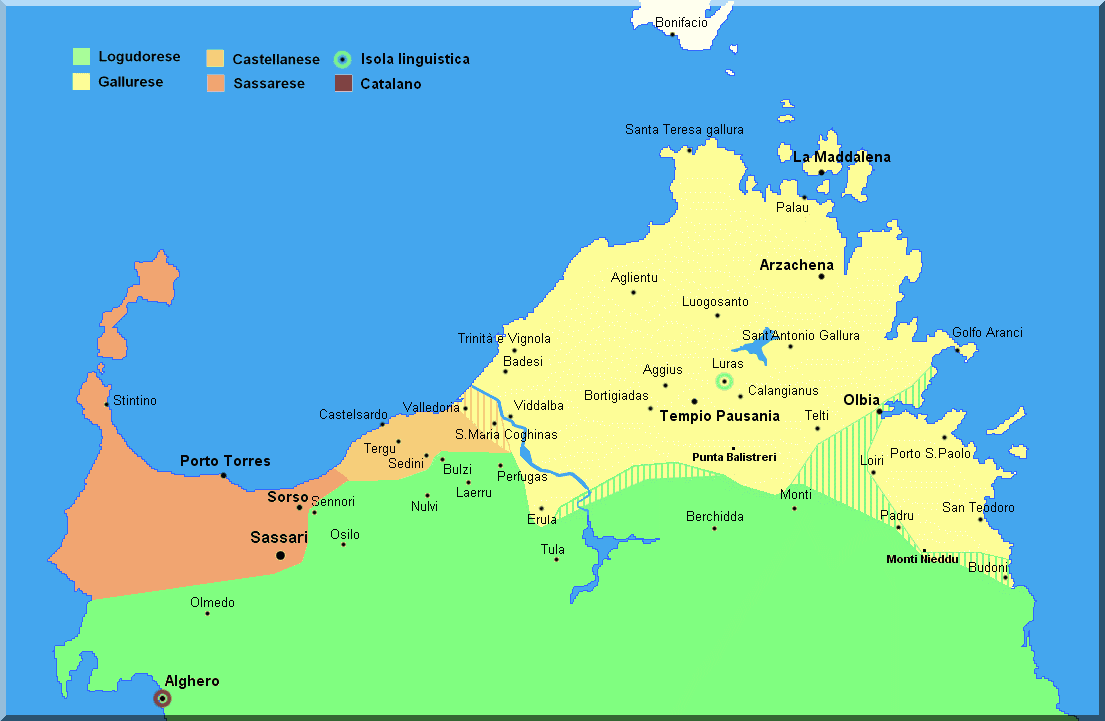
- Languages of northern Sardinia

Sassarese (natively sassaresu [sasːaˈrezu] or turritanu; Sardinian: tataresu [tataˈɾezu]) is an Italo-Dalmatian language spoken in coastal areas of northwestern Sardinia, Italy. Closely related to Gallurese and Corsican, it has its roots in medieval Tuscan because of Sassari's historic ties with Tuscany and geographical proximity to Corsica, despite the robust Sardinian influences (in terms of vocabulary and phonology, as well as syntax). Due to its origins, Sassarese has several similarities to the Italian language.

Sassarese is spoken by approximately 100,000 people, out of a total population of 175,000 in its area. Large Sassarese-speaking communities are present in Sassari, Stintino, Sorso, and Porto Torres. The Sassarese varieties transitioning to Gallurese, known as the Castellanesi dialects, can be heard in Castelsardo, Tergu, and Sedini.

Sassarese emerged as an urban lingua franca in the late part of the age of the Judicates (13th–14th century), based on a mixture of different languages – namely Sardinian, Corsican/Tuscan, and Ligurian. The neighbouring Logudorese dialects of Sardinian exercised a significant influence on the modern linguistic development, along with some Catalan and Spanish vocabulary. There exist many modern and older works both on and in Sassarese, and a number of cultural, social, and theatre events are held regularly in connection with it.

In 1943 the German linguist Max Leopold Wagner wrote:

... A vernacular which, by all indications, was gradually formed from the 16th century, after several very deadly plagues decimated the city's population; the bulk of the survivors were of Pisan and Corsican origin, there were even Genovese. Thus, this hybrid dialect was born, and is now spoken in Sassari, Porto Torres and Sorso, whose base is Tuscan-shifted with traces of Genovese, in addition to not a few Sardinian words.

== Official status ==
Sassarese is recognized as an official language by the regional government of Sardinia:

The same value attributed to the Sardinian culture and language is recognised referring to the relative territory, to the culture and Catalan language of Alghero, the Tabarchino of the islands of Sulcis, the Sassarese and Gallurese dialect.

— Autonomous Region of Sardinia., Art. 2, paragraph 4, Regional Law from 15 Oct 1997 about the "Promotion and valorization of the culture and language of Sardinia".

== Text sample: Extract from the Gospel of Matthew, Mat. 10:15-22 ==
Sassarese: "Ebagneliu sigundu Matteju"	Italian: "Vangelo secondo Matteo".
Vi diggu in viriddai: Sodoma, e Gomorra in la dì di lu giudiziu sarani megliu trattaddi di chissa ziddai. Eccu eju vi mandu cumenti peguri in mezu a li lupi. Sìaddi dunca prudenti comu li silpenti, e simplizi comu li culombi. Gualdeddibi però dall’omini. Palchì vi hani a fà cumparì in li cunzilj, e vi hani a frultà in li so’ sinagoghi: E vi hani a cunduzì dananzi a li presidi, e a li re par amori meju, pal tiltimognu d’eddis, e di li nazioni. Candu però v’hani a cunsignà in manu an eddi, no vi puniddi in pena di lu chi, e di lu comu abeddi a fabiddà: palchì vi sarà daddu in chissu mumentu lu chi abeddi a dì. Palchì no seddi voi li chi fabiddeddi, ma l’Ilpiritu di lu voltru Babbu è lu chi fabedda in voi. Lu fraddeddu però ha a pultà lu fraddeddu a la molti, e lu babbu lu figliolu: e li figlioli s’hani a vultà contra li babbi, e l’hani a dà la molti: E sareddi in odiu a tutti pal mutibu di lu me’ innomu: ca però ha a pilsivarà finza a la fini, chiltu sarà salvu.	In verità io vi dico: nel giorno del giudizio la terra di Sòdoma e Gomorra sarà trattata meno duramente di quella città. Ecco: io vi mando come pecore in mezzo a lupi; siate dunque prudenti come i serpenti e semplici come le colombe. Guardatevi dagli uomini, perché vi consegneranno ai tribunali e vi flagelleranno nelle loro sinagoghe; e sarete condotti davanti a governatori e re per causa mia, per dare testimonianza a loro e ai pagani. Ma, quando vi consegneranno, non preoccupatevi di come o di che cosa direte, perché vi sarà dato in quell’ora ciò che dovrete dire: infatti non siete voi a parlare, ma è lo Spirito del Padre vostro che parla in voi. Il fratello farà morire il fratello e il padre il figlio, e i figli si alzeranno ad accusare i genitori e li uccideranno. Sarete odiati da tutti a causa del mio nome. Ma chi avrà perseverato fino alla fine sarà salvato.

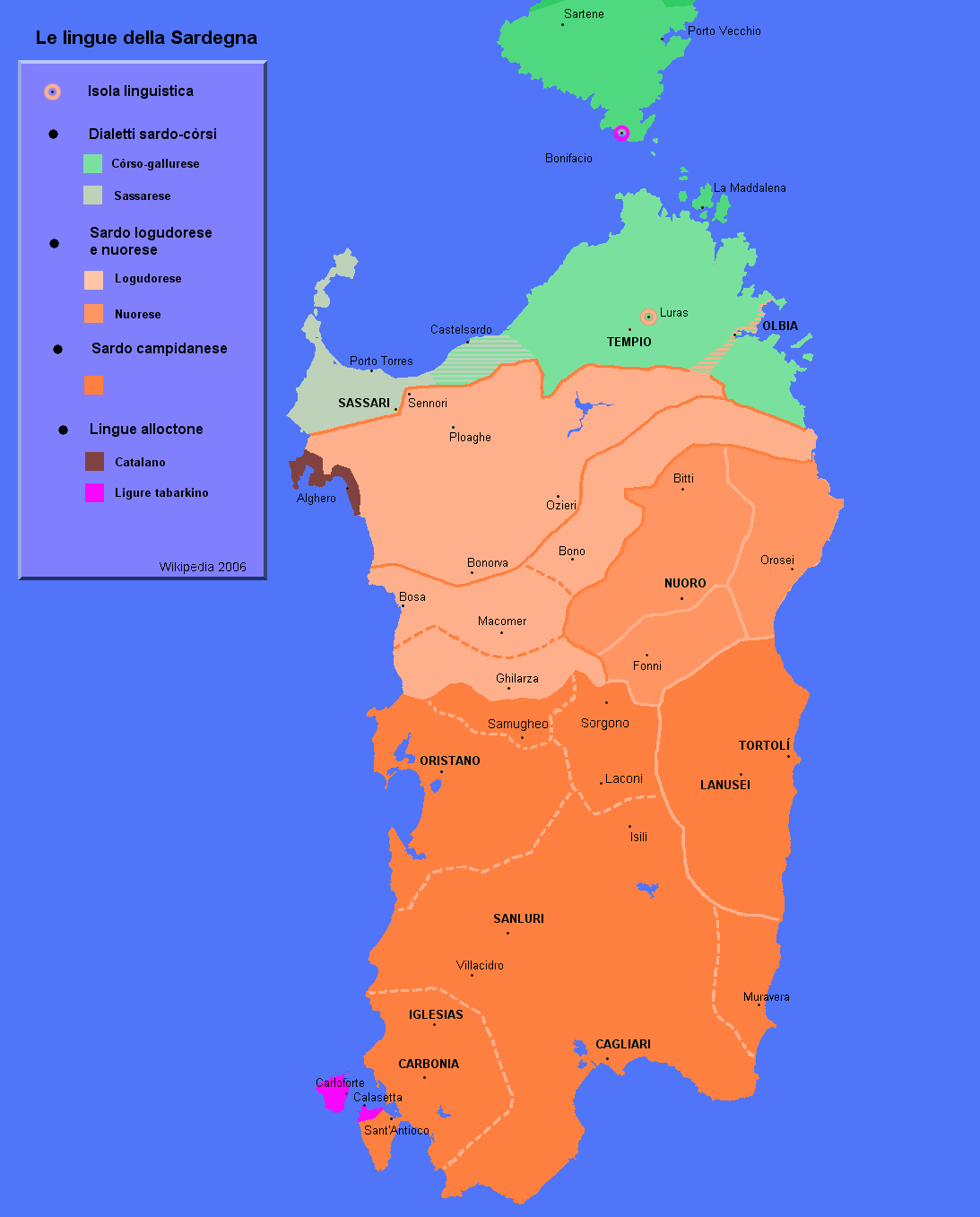
(in Italian) Sassarese compared to Sardinian dialects

(in Italian) Sassarese compared to Corsican dialects

== See also ==
- Sardinian, Corsican and Gallurese languages
- Sardinia, Sassari (Porto Torres, Sorso, Stintino, Castelsardo, Sedini and Tergu)
