= Santa Maria Coghinas =

Santa Maria Coghinas Cuzina (Sardinian) Cuzina (Gallurese)
- Comune
- Comune di Santa Maria Coghinas
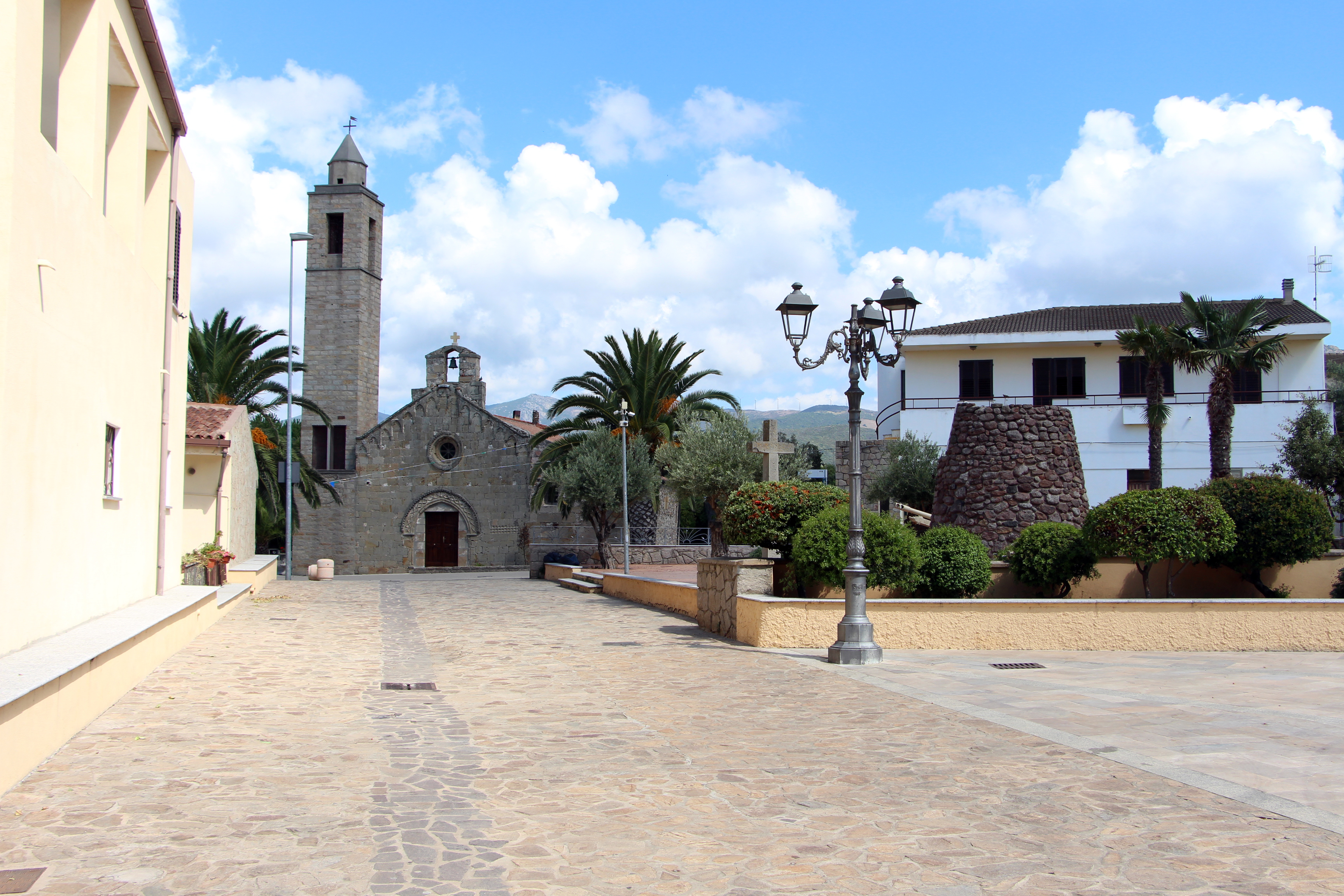
- Romanesque-Gothic church of Madonna delle Grazie

- Location within Sardinia
- Coordinates: 40°54′N 8°52′E
- Country: Italy
- Region: Sardinia
- Metropolitan city: Sassari (SS)
- Frazioni: Buroni, La Scalitta, Longareddu, Isolana, La Multa Bianca

Government
  - Mayor: Pietro Carbini

Area
  - Total: 22.97 km^{2} (8.87 sq mi)
- Elevation: 21 m (69 ft)

Population (2026)
  - Total: 1,346
  - Density: 58.60/km^{2} (151.8/sq mi)
- Demonym: Coghinesi or Cozinesi
- Time zone: UTC+1 (CET)
  - Summer (DST): UTC+2 (CEST)
- Postal code: 07030
- Dialing code: 079
- Website: Official website

Santa Maria Coghinas (Sardinian and Gallurese: Cuzina) is a town and comune (municipality) in the Metropolitan City of Sassari in the autonomous island region of Sardinia in Italy, located about 190 kilometres (120 mi) north of Cagliari and about 35 kilometres (22 mi) northeast of Sassari, in the Anglona traditional region, on the banks of Coghinas river. It has 1,346 inhabitants.

Santa Maria Coghinas borders the municipalities of Bortigiadas, Bulzi, Perfugas, Sedini, Valledoria, and Viddalba. It is known since the early 11th century as part of the giudicato of Torres. It became a municipality in 1983.

Sights include the Doria castle and the Romanesque-Gothic church of Madonna delle Grazie.

== Demographics ==
As of 2026, the population is 1,346, of which 52.2% are males, and 47.8% are females. Minors make up 11.9% of the population, and seniors make up 30.2%.

Historical population

Year	Pop.	±%
1861	237	—
1871	300	+26.6%
1881	325	+8.3%
1901	418	+28.6%
1911	492	+17.7%
1921	486	−1.2%
1931	571	+17.5%
1936	850	+48.9%

Year	Pop.	±%
1951	888	+4.5%
1961	1,596	+79.7%
1971	1,465	−8.2%
1981	1,459	−0.4%
1991	1,466	+0.5%
2001	1,439	−1.8%
2011	1,430	−0.6%
2021	1,309	−8.5%

Source: ISTAT

=== Immigration ===
As of 2025, immigrants make up 7.8% of the population. The 5 largest foreign countries of birth are Pakistan, Romania, Argentina, Morocco, and Switzerland.
