= Laerru =

- Comune
- Comune di Laerru
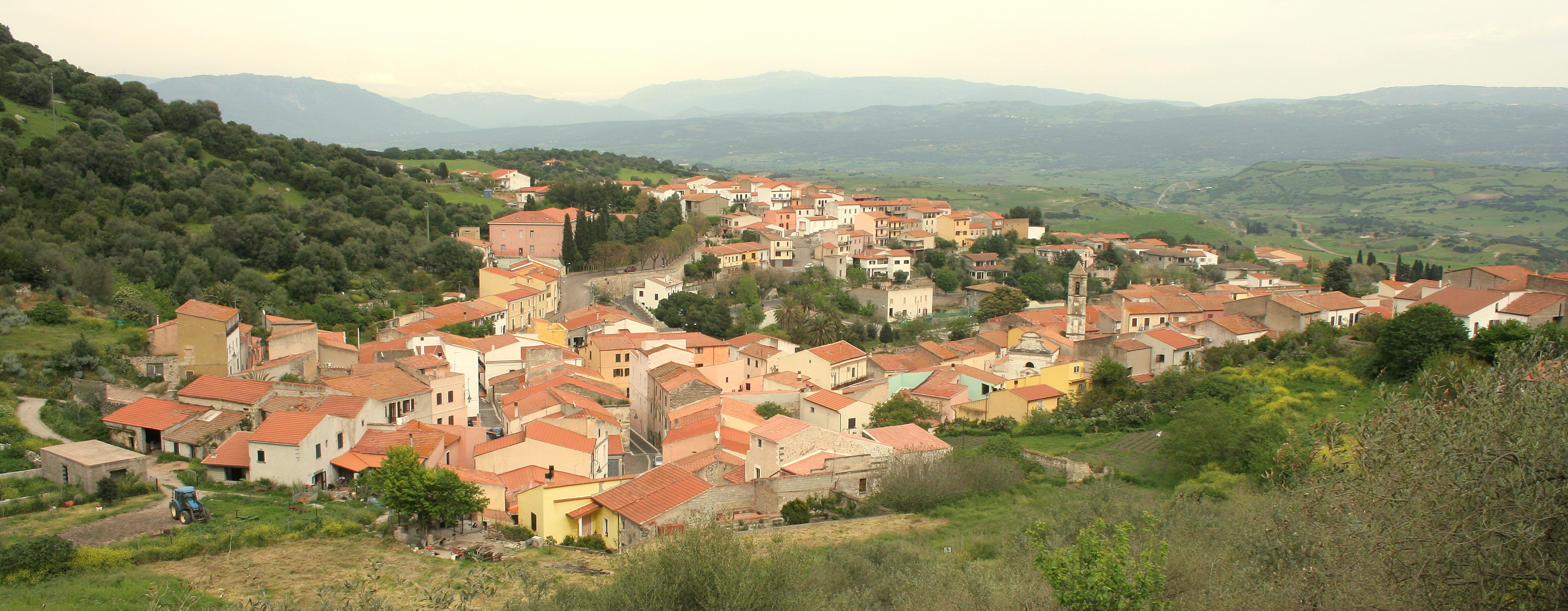
- View of Laerru

- Location within Sardinia
- Coordinates: 40°49′N 8°50′E
- Country: Italy
- Region: Sardinia
- Metropolitan city: Sassari (SS)

Government
  - Mayor: Pietro Moro

Area
  - Total: 19.85 km^{2} (7.66 sq mi)
- Elevation: 165 m (541 ft)

Population (2026)
  - Total: 806
  - Density: 40.6/km^{2} (105/sq mi)
- Demonym: Laerresi
- Time zone: UTC+1 (CET)
  - Summer (DST): UTC+2 (CEST)
- Postal code: 07030
- Dialing code: 079
- Website: Official website

Laerru is a village and comune (municipality) in the Metropolitan City of Sassari in the autonomous island region of Sardinia in Italy, located about 180 kilometres (110 mi) north of Cagliari and about 25 kilometres (16 mi) northeast of Sassari. It has 806 inhabitants.

Laerru borders the municipalities of Bulzi, Martis, Nulvi, Perfugas, and Sedini.

== Demographics ==
As of 2026, the population is 806, of which 50.5% are male, and 49.5% are female. Minors make up 8.8% of the population, and seniors make up 28.9%.

Historical population

Year	Pop.	±%
1861	701	—
1871	784	+11.8%
1881	819	+4.5%
1901	1,073	+31.0%
1911	1,103	+2.8%
1921	1,130	+2.4%
1931	1,029	−8.9%
1936	1,161	+12.8%

Year	Pop.	±%
1951	1,463	+26.0%
1961	1,521	+4.0%
1971	1,232	−19.0%
1981	1,166	−5.4%
1991	1,115	−4.4%
2001	1,029	−7.7%
2011	945	−8.2%
2021	859	−9.1%

Source: ISTAT

=== Immigration ===
As of 2025, immigrants make up 5.2% of the population. The 5 largest foreign countries of birth are France, Germany, Romania, Morocco, and Poland.
