= Martis =

Martis Martis (Sardinian)
- Comune
- Comune di Martis
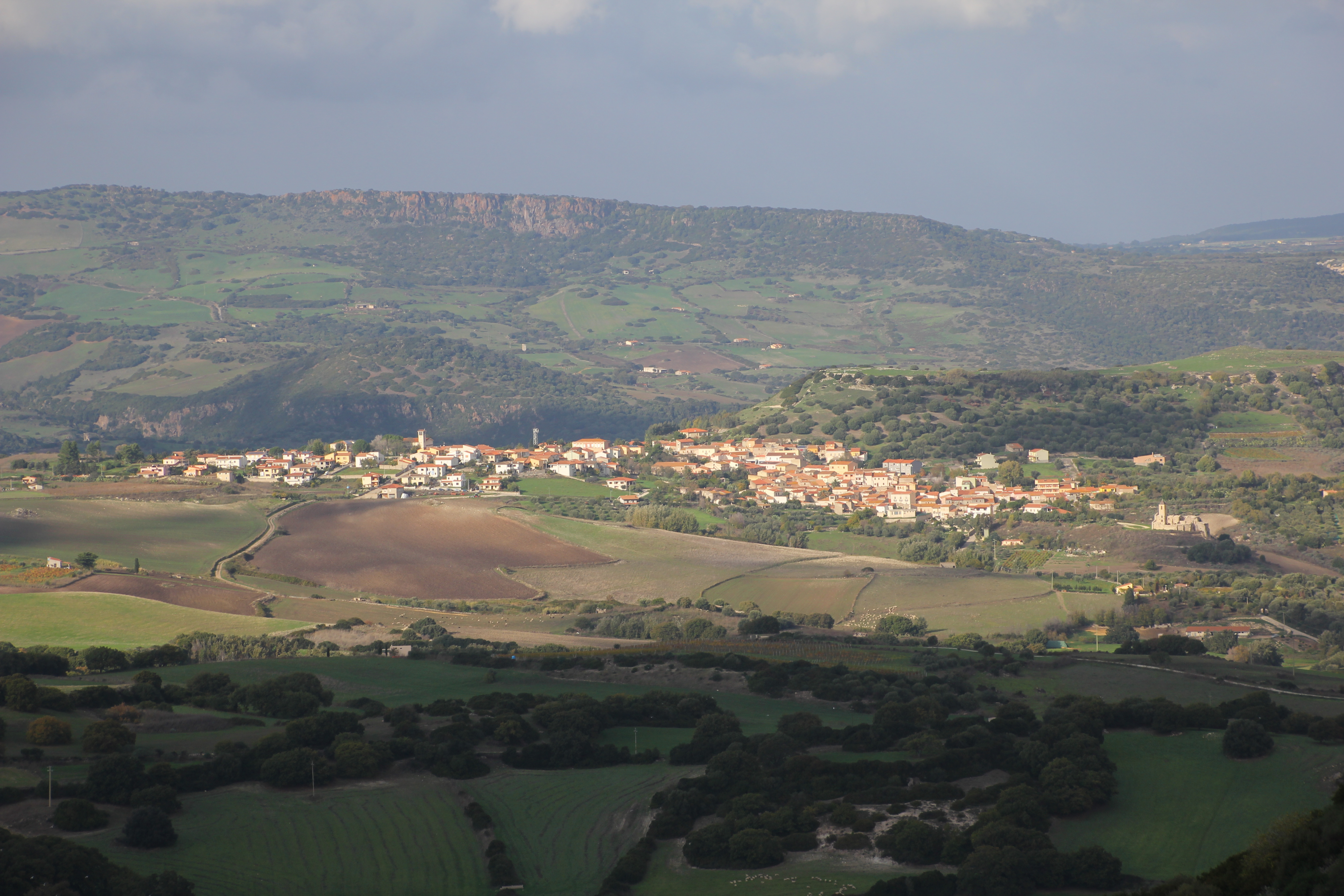
- View of Martis

- Location within Sardinia
- Coordinates: 40°47′N 8°49′E
- Country: Italy
- Region: Sardinia
- Metropolitan city: Sassari (SS)

Area
  - Total: 22.96 km^{2} (8.86 sq mi)

Population (2026)
  - Total: 455
  - Density: 19.8/km^{2} (51.3/sq mi)
- Time zone: UTC+1 (CET)
  - Summer (DST): UTC+2 (CEST)
- Postal code: 07030
- Dialing code: 079

Martis (Sardinian: Martis or Maltis) is a village and comune (municipality) in the Metropolitan City of Sassari in the autonomous island region of Sardinia in Italy, about 180 kilometres (110 mi) north of Cagliari and about 25 kilometres (16 mi) east of Sassari. It has 455 inhabitants.

Martis borders the municipalities of Chiaramonti, Laerru, Nulvi, and Perfugas.

== Demographics ==
As of 2026, the population is 455, of which 50.1% are male, and 49.9% are female. Minors make up 10.5% of the population, and seniors make up 34.3%.

Historical population

Year	Pop.	±%
1861	922	—
1871	854	−7.4%
1881	887	+3.9%
1901	1,056	+19.1%
1911	1,285	+21.7%
1921	1,068	−16.9%
1931	1,080	+1.1%
1936	1,040	−3.7%

Year	Pop.	±%
1951	1,253	+20.5%
1961	1,220	−2.6%
1971	810	−33.6%
1981	751	−7.3%
1991	665	−11.5%
2001	630	−5.3%
2011	553	−12.2%
2021	470	−15.0%

Source: ISTAT

=== Immigration ===
As of 2025, immigrants make up 3.8% of the population. The 5 largest foreign countries of birth are Germany, the United Kingdom, Albania, the Czech Republic, and France.
