= Perfugas =

Perfugas Pèifugas (Sardinian) Pelfica (Gallurese)
- Comune
- Comune di Perfugas
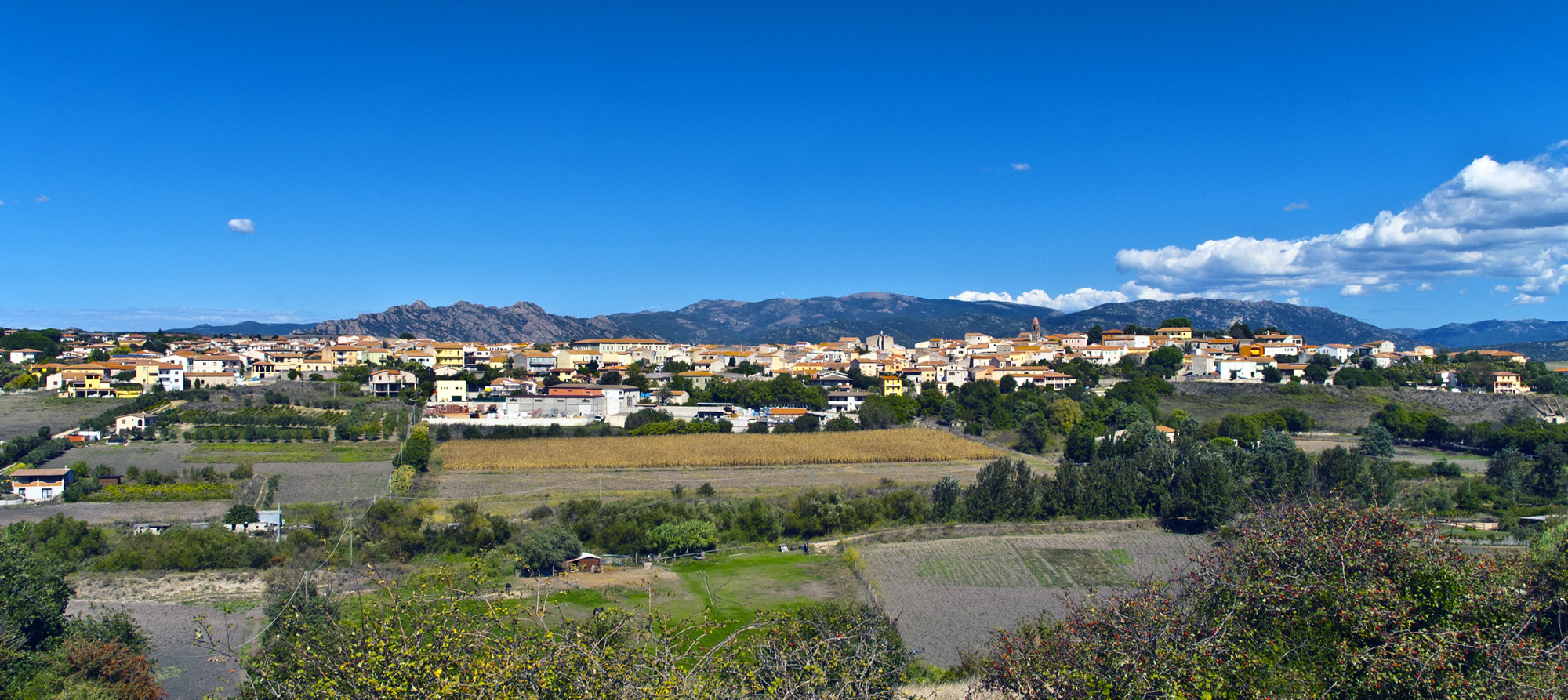
- View of Perfugas

- Location within Sardinia
- Coordinates: 40°50′N 8°53′E
- Country: Italy
- Region: Sardinia
- Metropolitan city: Sassari (SS)

Government
  - Mayor: Domenico Decandia

Area
  - Total: 60.88 km^{2} (23.51 sq mi)
- Elevation: 90 m (300 ft)

Population (2026)
  - Total: 2,212
  - Density: 36.33/km^{2} (94.10/sq mi)
- Demonym: Perfughesi
- Time zone: UTC+1 (CET)
  - Summer (DST): UTC+2 (CEST)
- Postal code: 07034
- Dialing code: 079
- Website: Official website

Perfugas (Sardinian: Pèifugas, Gallurese: Pelfica) is a comune (municipality) in the Metropolitan City of Sassari in the Italian region Sardinia, located about 180 kilometres (110 mi) north of Cagliari and about 30 kilometres (19 mi) northeast of Sassari. It has 2,212 inhabitants.

Perfugas borders the municipalities of Bortigiadas, Bulzi, Chiaramonti, Erula, Laerru, Martis, Santa Maria Coghinas, and Tempio Pausania.

== Demographics ==
As of 2026, the population is 2,212, of which 50.1% are males, and 49.9% are females. Minors make up 12.9% of the population, and seniors make up 30.9%.

Historical population

Year	Pop.	±%
1861	1,023	—
1871	1,171	+14.5%
1881	1,174	+0.3%
1901	1,383	+17.8%
1911	1,736	+25.5%
1921	1,621	−6.6%
1931	1,869	+15.3%
1936	2,079	+11.2%

Year	Pop.	±%
1951	2,723	+31.0%
1961	2,777	+2.0%
1971	2,390	−13.9%
1981	2,531	+5.9%
1991	2,489	−1.7%
2001	2,488	−0.0%
2011	2,415	−2.9%
2021	2,272	−5.9%

Source: ISTAT

=== Immigration ===
As of 2025, immigrants make up 4.5% of the population. The 5 largest foreign countries of birth are Romania, Switzerland, Germany, France, and Morocco.

== Sights ==
Sights include the church of Santa Maria degli Angeli (16th-17tj centuries), home to the so-called retablo of San Giorgio, one of the largest altarpieces in Sardinia, the Catalan Gothic-style church of San Giorgio, and the so-called "Sacred Pit of Predio Canopoli", a nuraghe era archaeological site.
