= Bulzi =

Bulzi Bultzi (Sardinian)
- Comune
- Comune di Bulzi
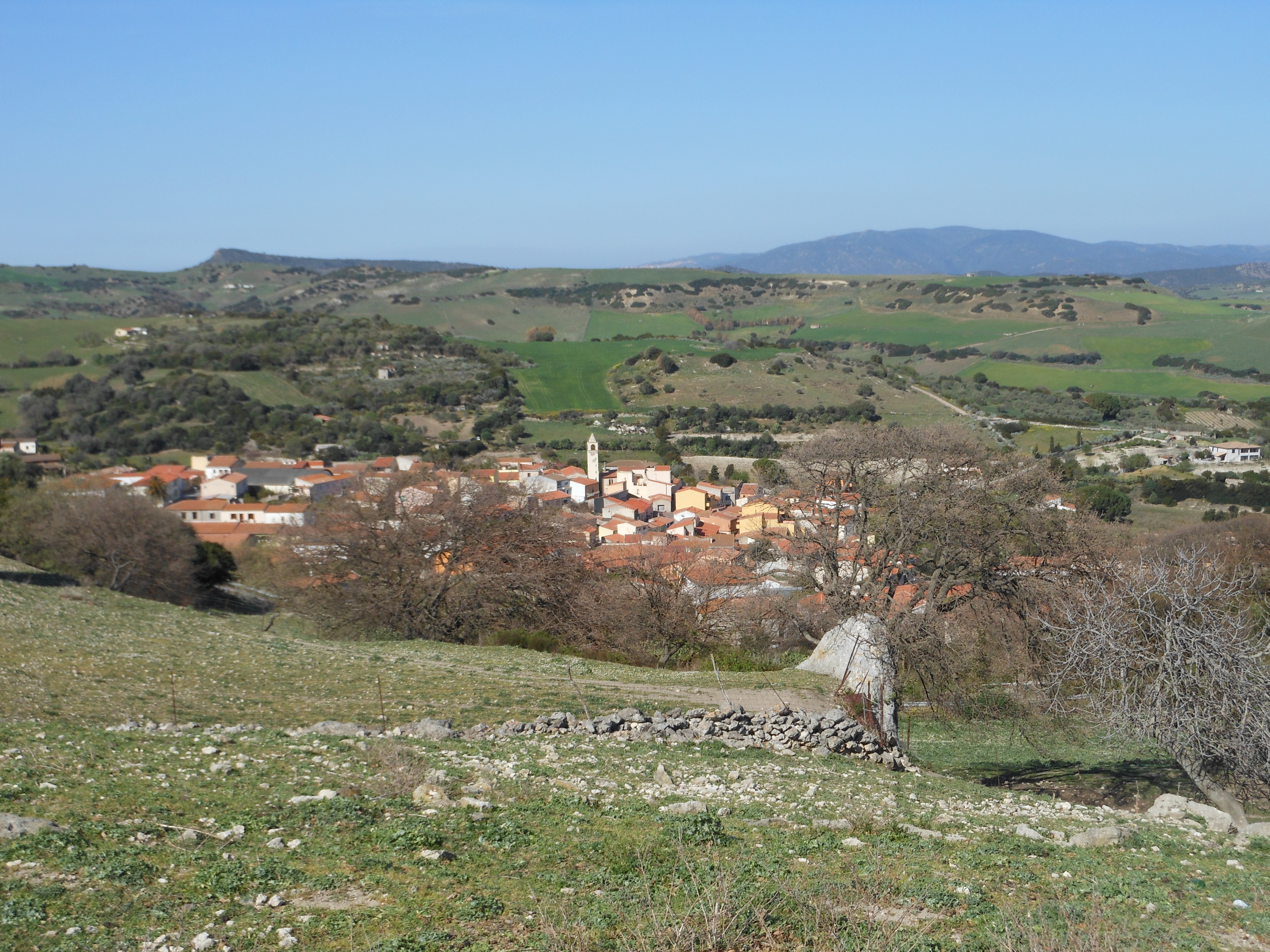
- View of Bulzi

- Location within Sardinia
- Coordinates: 40°51′N 8°50′E
- Country: Italy
- Region: Sardinia
- Metropolitan city: Sassari (SS)

Government
  - Mayor: Edoardo Multineddu

Area
  - Total: 21.67 km^{2} (8.37 sq mi)
- Elevation: 250 m (820 ft)

Population (2026)
  - Total: 507
  - Density: 23.4/km^{2} (60.6/sq mi)
- Demonym: Bulzesi
- Time zone: UTC+1 (CET)
  - Summer (DST): UTC+2 (CEST)
- Postal code: 07030
- Dialing code: 079
- Website: Official website

Bulzi (Sardinian: Bultzi) is a village and comune (municipality) in the Metropolitan City of Sassari in the autonomous island region of Sardinia in Italy, located about 180 kilometres (110 mi) north of Cagliari and about 25 kilometres (16 mi) northeast of Sassari. It has 507 inhabitants.

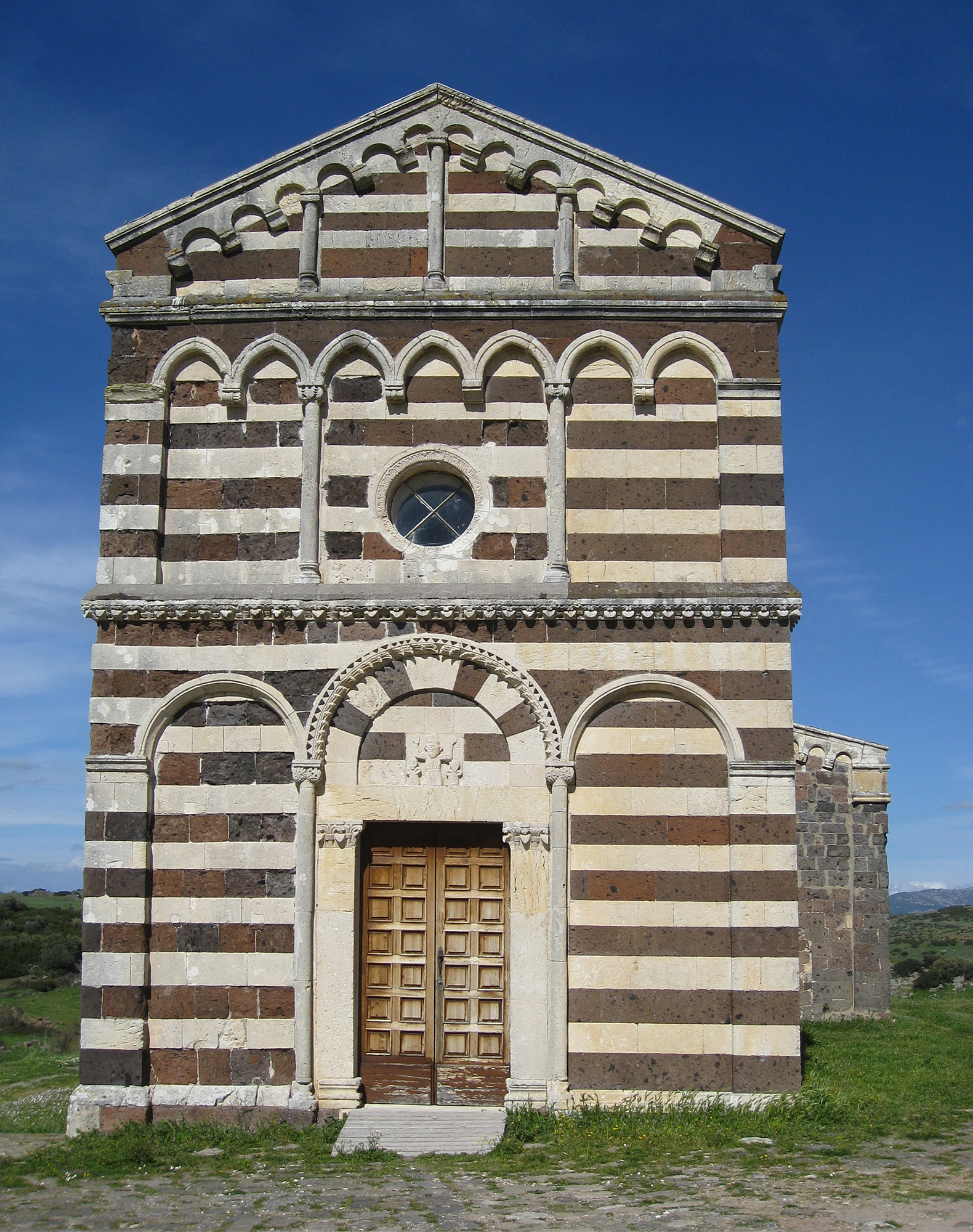
Church of San Pietro del Crocifisso

Sights include the 12th century church of San Pietro del Crocifisso, or San Pietro delle Immagini, an example of Sardinian Romanesque style.

Bulzi borders the municipalities of Laerru, Perfugas, Santa Maria Coghinas, and Sedini.

== Demographics ==
As of 2026, the population is 507, of which 51.7% are male, and 48.3% are female. Minors make up 9.3% of the population, and seniors make up 35.1%.

Historical population

Year	Pop.	±%
1861	588	—
1871	617	+4.9%
1881	644	+4.4%
1901	651	+1.1%
1911	726	+11.5%
1921	701	−3.4%
1931	682	−2.7%
1936	733	+7.5%

Year	Pop.	±%
1951	850	+16.0%
1961	903	+6.2%
1971	809	−10.4%
1981	746	−7.8%
1991	689	−7.6%
2001	634	−8.0%
2011	552	−12.9%
2021	470	−14.9%

Source: ISTAT

=== Immigration ===
As of 2025, immigrants make up 11.3% of the population. The 5 largest foreign countries of birth are Brazil, France, Germany, Switzerland, and Slovakia.
