= Tergu =

Tergu Zelgu
- Comune
- Comune di Tergu
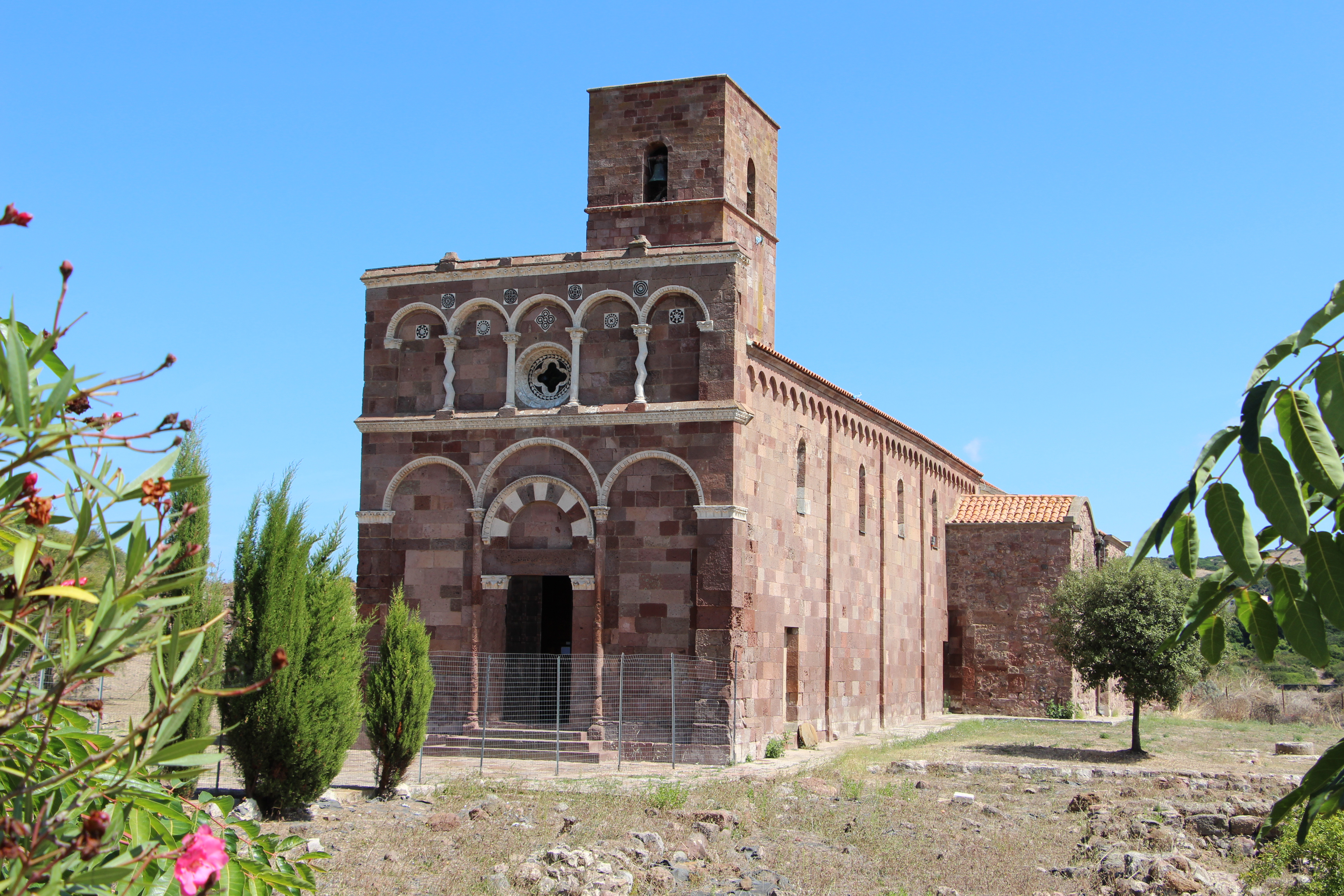
- Nostra Signora di Tergu church

- Location within Sardinia
- Coordinates: 40°52′N 8°43′E
- Country: Italy
- Region: Sardinia
- Metropolitan city: Sassari (SS)

Government
  - Mayor: Luca Ruzzu

Area
  - Total: 36.5 km^{2} (14.1 sq mi)
- Elevation: 284 m (932 ft)

Population (30 November 2014)
  - Total: 589
  - Density: 16.1/km^{2} (41.8/sq mi)
- Demonym: Targulani or Zelgulani
- Time zone: UTC+1 (CET)
  - Summer (DST): UTC+2 (CEST)
- Postal code: 07030
- Dialing code: 079
- Website: Official website

Tergu (Sassarese: Zelgu) is a comune (municipality) in the Metropolitan City of Sassari in the Italian region Sardinia, located about 190 kilometres (120 mi) north of Cagliari and about 20 kilometres (12 mi) northeast of Sassari in the Anglona historical regiona.

It is home to the Romanesque church of Nostra Signora di Tergu.
