= Ploaghe =

Ploaghe Piaghe
- Comune
- Comune di Ploaghe
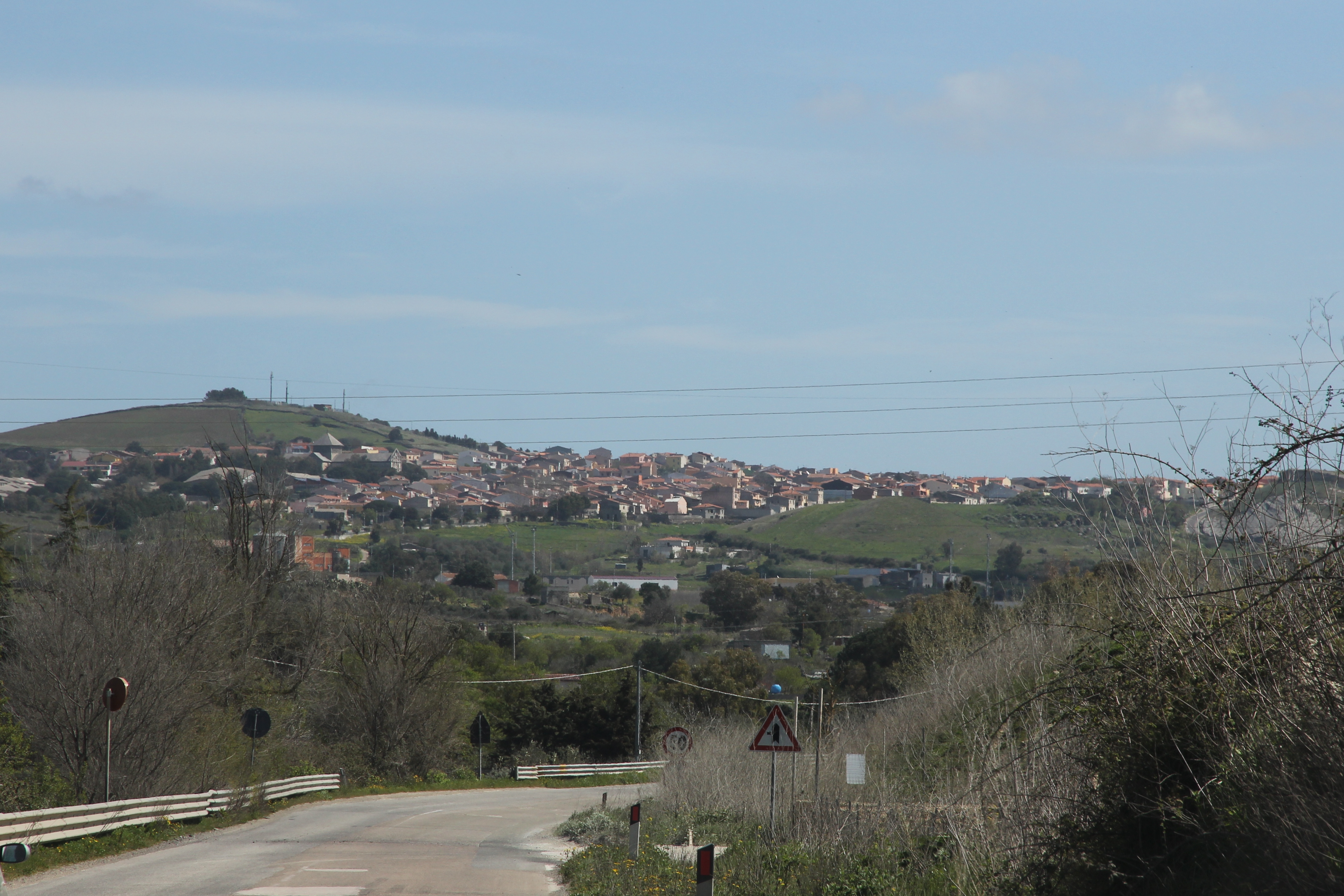
- View of Ploaghe

- Location within Sardinia
- Coordinates: 40°40′N 8°45′E
- Country: Italy
- Region: Sardinia
- Metropolitan city: Sassari (SS)

Government
  - Mayor: Carlo Sotgiu

Area
  - Total: 96.27 km^{2} (37.17 sq mi)
- Elevation: 427 m (1,401 ft)

Population (2026)
  - Total: 4,201
  - Density: 43.64/km^{2} (113.0/sq mi)
- Demonym: Ploaghesi
- Time zone: UTC+1 (CET)
  - Summer (DST): UTC+2 (CEST)
- Postal code: 07017
- Dialing code: 079
- Website: Official website

Ploaghe (Sardinian: Piàghe) is a town and comune (municipality) in the Metropolitan City of Sassari in the autonomous island region of Sardinia in Italy, located about 160 kilometres (99 mi) north of Cagliari and about 21 kilometres (13 mi) southeast of Sassari. It has 4,201 inhabitants.

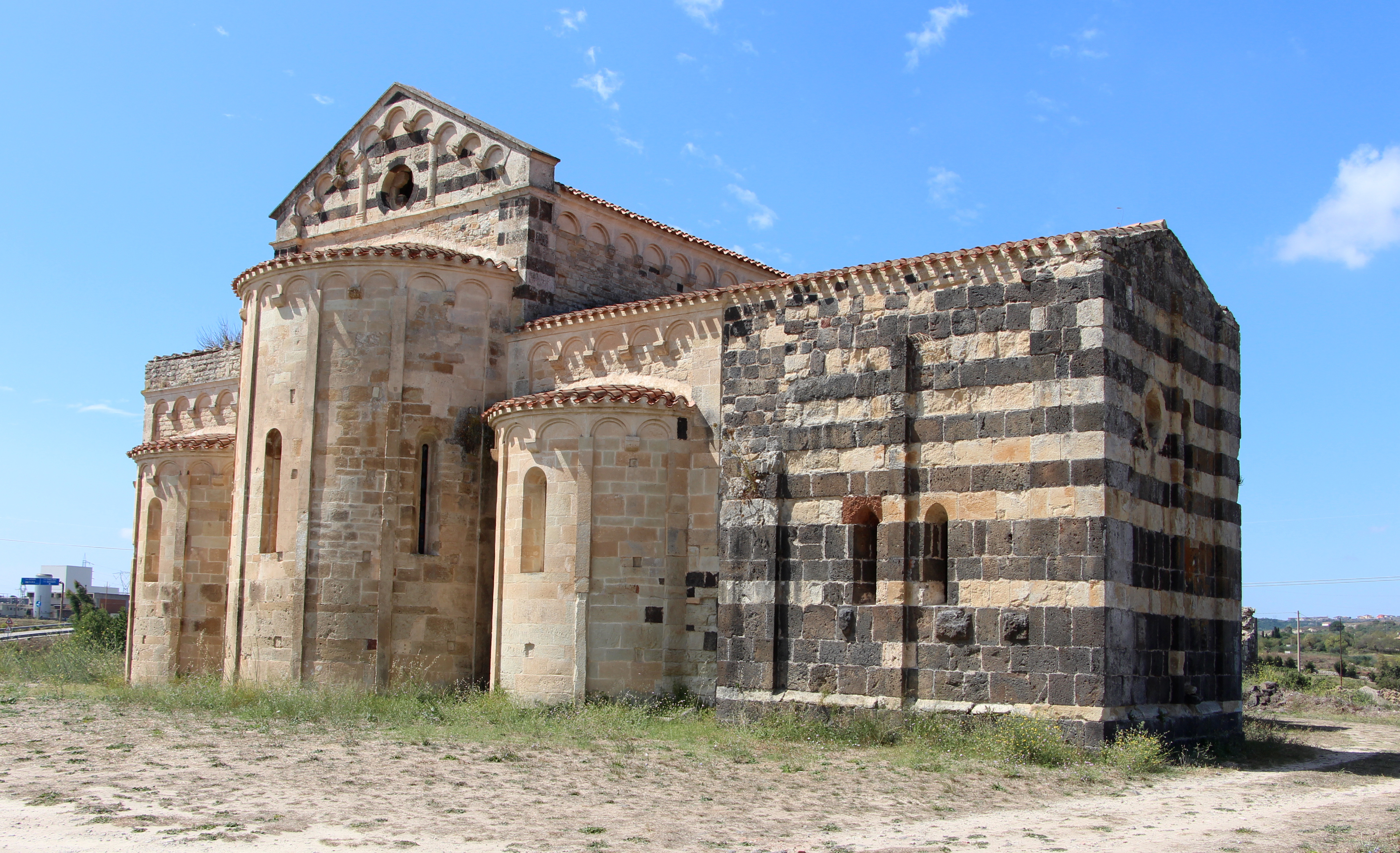
San Michele abbey

Ploaghe borders the municipalities of Ardara, Chiaramonti, Codrongianos, Nulvi, Osilo, and Siligo.

== Demographics ==
As of 2026, the population is 4,201, of which 49.8% are males, and 50.2% are females. Minors make up 13.9% of the population, and seniors make up 28.4%.

Historical population

Year	Pop.	±%
1861	3,038	—
1871	3,526	+16.1%
1881	3,497	−0.8%
1901	4,009	+14.6%
1911	4,136	+3.2%
1921	4,003	−3.2%
1931	4,318	+7.9%
1936	4,522	+4.7%

Year	Pop.	±%
1951	4,972	+10.0%
1961	4,952	−0.4%
1971	4,520	−8.7%
1981	4,676	+3.5%
1991	4,861	+4.0%
2001	4,816	−0.9%
2011	4,653	−3.4%
2021	4,350	−6.5%

Source: ISTAT

=== Immigration ===
As of 2025, immigrants make up 3.8% of the population. The 5 largest foreign countries of birth are Morocco, Romania, France, Switzerland, and Germany.

== Notable people ==
- Andrea Arru (born 2007), actor
- Giovanni Spano (1803-1878), scholar of archaeology, linguist, and politician.
