= Chiaramonti =

Chiaramonti Tzaramònte (Sardinian) Chjaramònti (Gallurese)
- Comune
- Comune di Chiaramonti
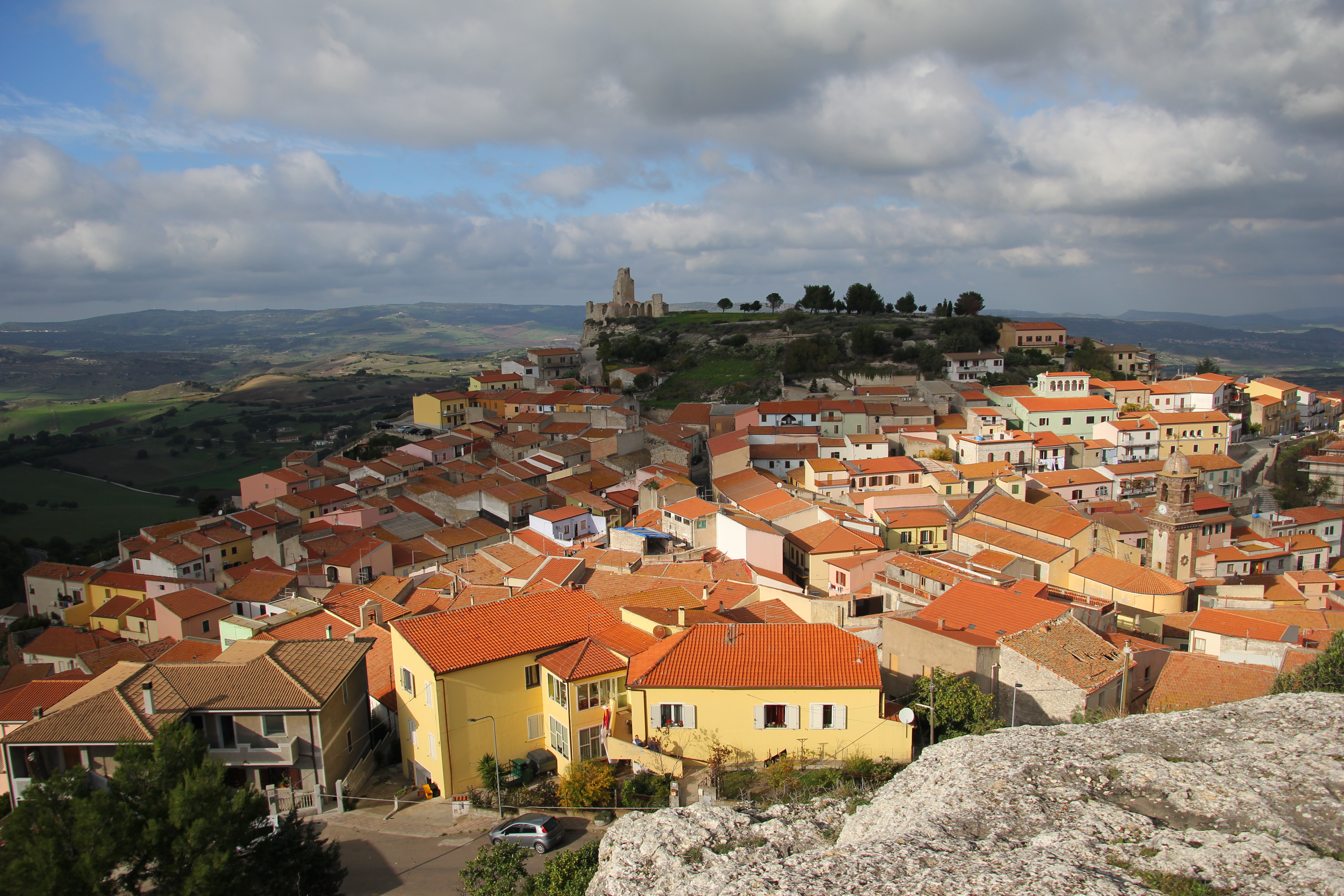
- View of Chiaramonti

- Location within Sardinia
- Coordinates: 40°45′N 8°49′E
- Country: Italy
- Region: Sardinia
- Metropolitan city: Sassari (SS)

Government
  - Mayor: Giovanni Maria Retanda

Area
  - Total: 98.61 km^{2} (38.07 sq mi)
- Elevation: 400 m (1,300 ft)

Population (2026)
  - Total: 1,494
  - Density: 15.15/km^{2} (39.24/sq mi)
- Demonym: Chiaramontesi
- Time zone: UTC+1 (CET)
  - Summer (DST): UTC+2 (CEST)
- Postal code: 07030
- Dialing code: 079
- Website: Official website

Chiaramonti (Sardinian: Tzaramònte, Gallurese: Chjaramònti, literally "Clear Mountains") is a town and comune (municipality) in the Metropolitan City of Sassari in the autonomous island region of Sardinia in Italy, located in the historical region of Anglona about 170 kilometres (110 mi) north of Cagliari and about 25 kilometres (16 mi) east of Sassari. It has 1,494 inhabitants.

Chiaramonti borders the municipalities of Ardara, Erula, Martis, Nulvi, Ozieri, Perfugas, and Ploaghe.

== Demographics ==
As of 2026, the population is 1,494, of which 49.0% are male, and 51.0% are female. Minors make up 11.8% of the population, and seniors make up 29.6%.

Historical population

Year	Pop.	±%
1861	1,802	—
1871	1,746	−3.1%
1881	1,826	+4.6%
1901	2,099	+15.0%
1911	2,340	+11.5%
1921	1,994	−14.8%
1931	2,150	+7.8%
1936	2,289	+6.5%

Year	Pop.	±%
1951	2,694	+17.7%
1961	2,472	−8.2%
1971	2,040	−17.5%
1981	1,989	−2.5%
1991	1,997	+0.4%
2001	1,915	−4.1%
2011	1,735	−9.4%
2021	1,525	−12.1%

Source: ISTAT

=== Immigration ===
As of 2025, immigrants make up 4.5% of the population. The 5 largest foreign countries of birth are Belgium, France, Germany, the United Kingdom, and Romania.
