= Anglona =

Coordinates: 40.9136°N 8.7133°E

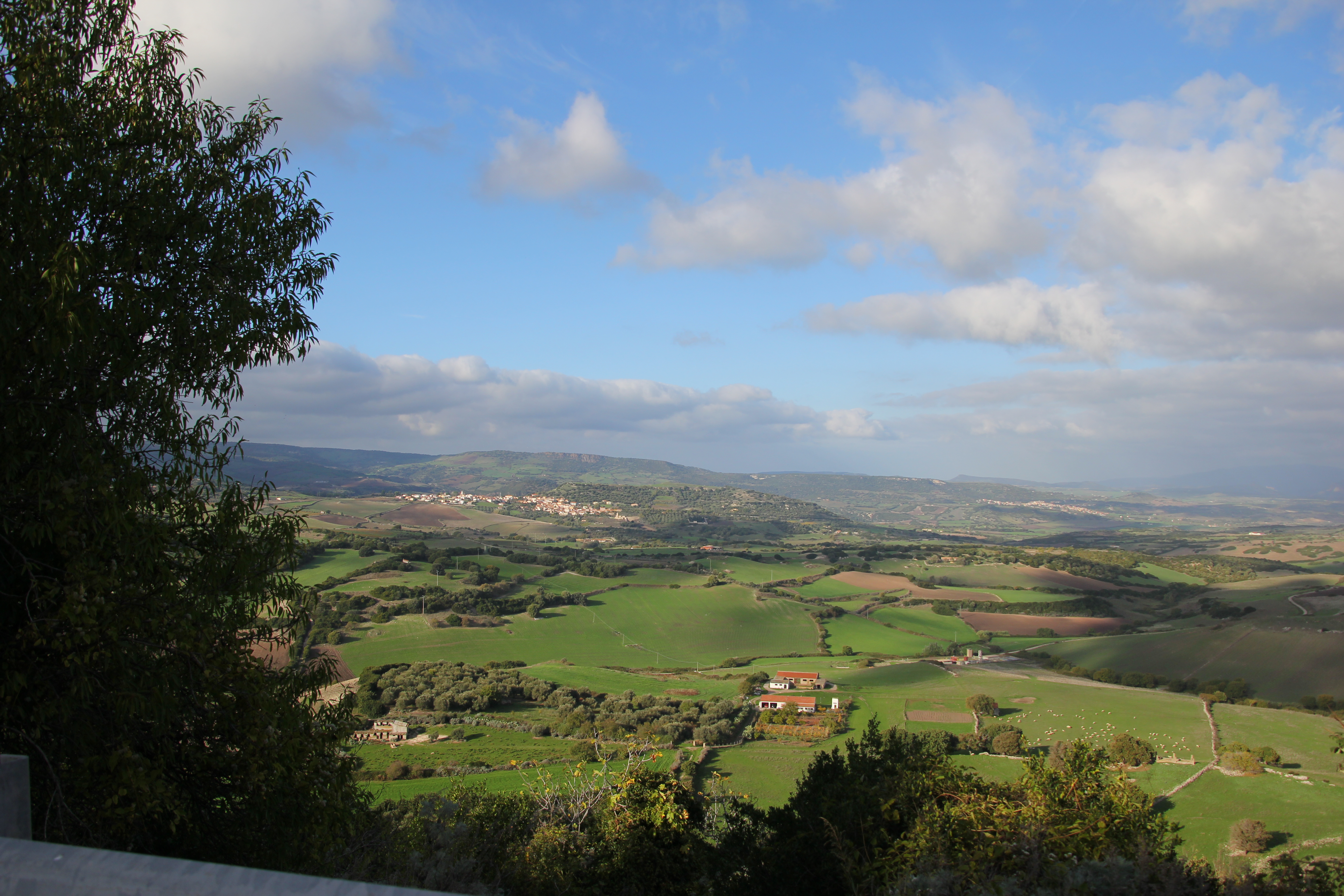
Rural landscape of Anglona

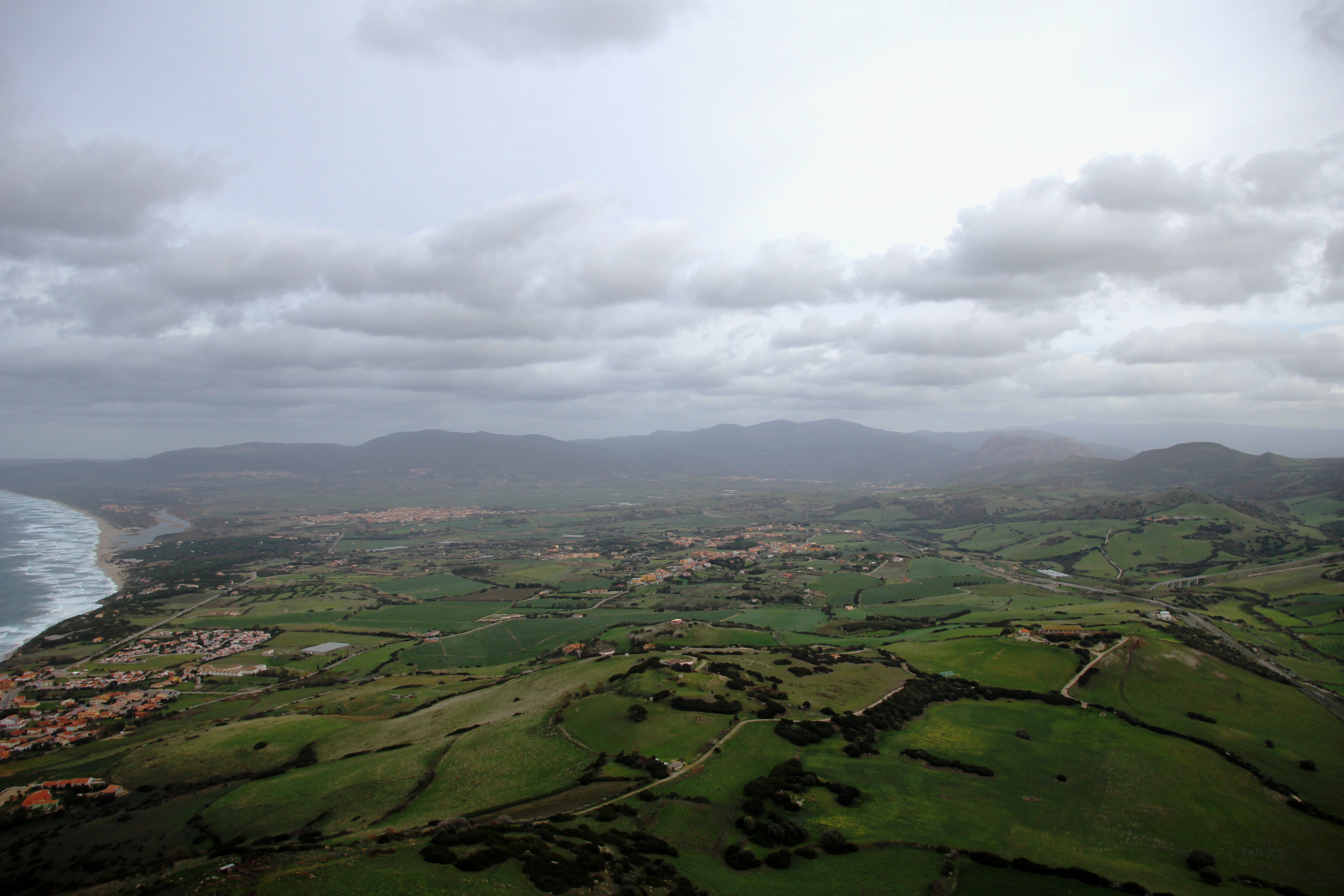
Coastal landscape of Anglona

Anglona is a historical region of northern Sardinia, Italy. Its main center is Castelsardo.

There once was a diocese of Anglona, now part of the Diocese of Tursi-Lagonegro.

== Geography ==
Anglona is bounded by the sea northwards, from east by the Coghinas river, from south by Monte Sassu and from west by the Silis River and the Monte Pilosu.

The territory is characterized by a prevalence of hills, with small plateaus of volcanic or limestone origin, lying over a tuff base. The coast shows beaches intermingled with rocky sectors.

== Economy ==
Economy is mostly based on agriculture, especially after the reclamation of the lower Coghinas valley during the 1920s, which has saved the fertile area from floods. The main crops are artichokes and tomatoes.

Starting from the 1970s, the coastal communes have developed a flourishing tourism industry.
