= Elisabetta Sanna =

Italian Franciscan tertiary declared Blessed

Blessed Elisabetta Sanna TOSF
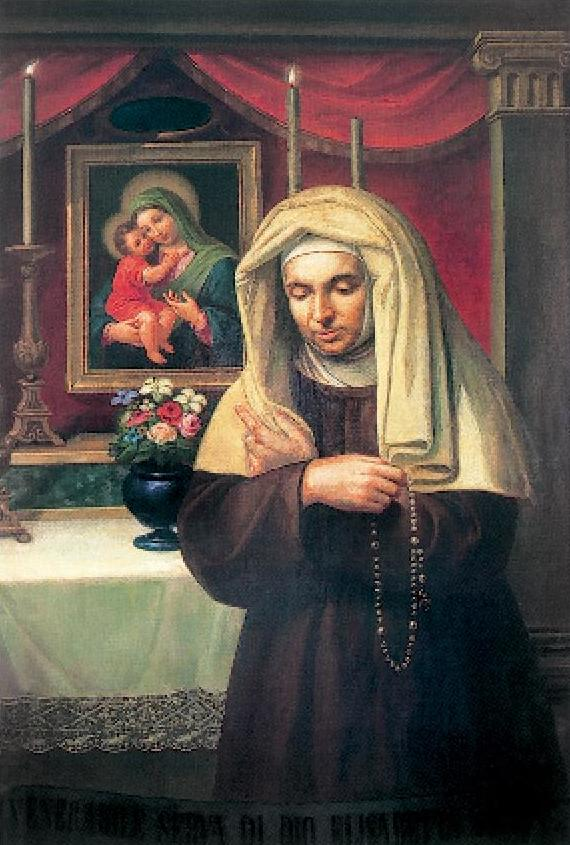
- Image c. 1900

Widow
- Born: Elisabetta Sanna Porcu; 23 April 1788; Codrongianos, Sassari, Kingdom of Sardinia
- Died: 17 February 1857 (aged 68); Rome, Papal States
- Resting place: Church of San Salvatore in Onda, Rome, Italy
- Venerated in: Roman Catholic Church
- Beatified: 17 September 2016, Codrongianos, Italy by Cardinal Angelo Amato, SDB
- Feast: 17 February
- Attributes: religious habit of a Third Order Franciscan, Franciscan crown rosary

'Elisabetta Sanna, (full name Elisabetta Sanna Porcu) (23 April 1788 – 17 February 1857) was an Italian Roman Catholic from Codrongianos Province of Sassari who was a member of both the Third Order of Saint Francis and the Union of the Catholic Apostolate. In the latter she was a friend and compatriot of Vincent Pallotti. As a result of smallpox, Sanna was for the most part disabled and further ailments prevented her from returning to her hometown after departing on a pilgrimage; this forced her to take up residence in Rome where she later died.

Sanna married and bore seven children but was widowed after almost two decades of marriage.

Pope Francis proclaimed her to be venerable in 2014 after determining that she lived a life of heroic virtue. The pope approved the miracle attributed to her intercession in 2016 which allowed for her beatification to occur. Cardinal Angelo Amato presided over the beatification on 17 September 2016.

== Life ==
Sanna was born on 23 April 1788 as the second of five children to poor farmers of harsh economic conditions; a brother was Antonio Luigi. At three months old she contracted smallpox and as a result was never able to again raise her arms. She was able to move her fingers and wrists but could neither bring food to her mouth nor make the sign of the Cross, amongst other things.

She received her confirmation on 27 April 1794 from the Archbishop of Sassari, Giacinto della Torre. She was later entrusted to the care of Lucia Pinna who was a member of the Third Order of Saint Francis. Pinna taught Sanna the importance of frequent praying of the rosary as well as Eucharistic adoration and both proper treatment and love of the poor. Despite being in a strong household of fundamental Christian values she learned the importance of loving Jesus Christ while at school despite the fact that she remained illiterate during her entire life. Not long after, she received her First Communion and her first reconciliation. Each week Sanna attended sessions that her father's cousin Luigi Sanna held in which she learned the basics of the catechism; she encouraged others to follow suit. On one particular occasion Sanna gazed into a crucifix and heard a voice: "Take courage and love me"; she realized that she had received a personal mission to proclaim the message of the Gospel in the spirit of evangelization.

On 13 September 1807 she married Antonio Porcu and the two went on to have seven children. The oldest was born in 1808 and the last was born in 1822 and two died soon after their births. Her husband died on 25 January 1825 when her oldest was seventeen and her last child was three. This meant she had to double the workload in the house in order to provide for her children.

In 1829 Sanna met the priest Giuseppe Valle who soon became her spiritual advisor. The two decided to go on a pilgrimage to the Holy Land and as a result Sanna had to entrust her children to her mother and her brother Antonio Luigi; she also sought the help of her niece and neighbours. Sanna and Valle departed from Porto Torres to Genoa at the end of June 1830 where the pair waited for over a week for a ship to Cyprus. However the two could not continue further to their destination due to the fact that Valle had no visa and was forbidden to keep going. The pair decided to go to Rome and arrived there on 23 July 1830. Valle remained at her side as an assistant until 1839.

Sanna became a professed member of the Third Order of Saint Francis and she devoted herself to following the example of Francis of Assisi. On a visit to Saint Peter's Basilica, she met Camillo Loria who heard her confession; Loria ordered her to return to Sassari but she found with her ailments that she could not return home at all. She soon came into contact with Vincent Pallotti who took her in his care and contacted her brother to tell him that she was unfit to return home. Sanna wept but entrusted herself to God and his providence for sustenance. Around this time she also worked in the house of the future cardinal Giovanni Saglia. Pallotti continued to serve as her spiritual director for almost two decades and he held her in considerable esteem, realizing her to be a true agent of God.

In Rome she educated other children in the catechism and she also prepared them for the sacraments. Her house was open to all women who wanted to learn the religious litanies and the catechism in general. Sanna also visited the ill and comforted them in private homes and in the Hospital for Incurables. She knitted and the result as well as gifts given to her were used to help the poor and the orphans in the two houses that Pallotti founded. She attended several Masses on a frequent basis and also took time for Eucharistic Adoration. People visited her for advice and even Pallotti and his Pallottines visited her for advice too. She soon witnessed the foundation of the Union of the Catholic Apostolate and she became an active member of that organization. With Pallotti's death in 1850 she felt alone more than ever before but she continued to place her complete trust in God despite this great personal loss.

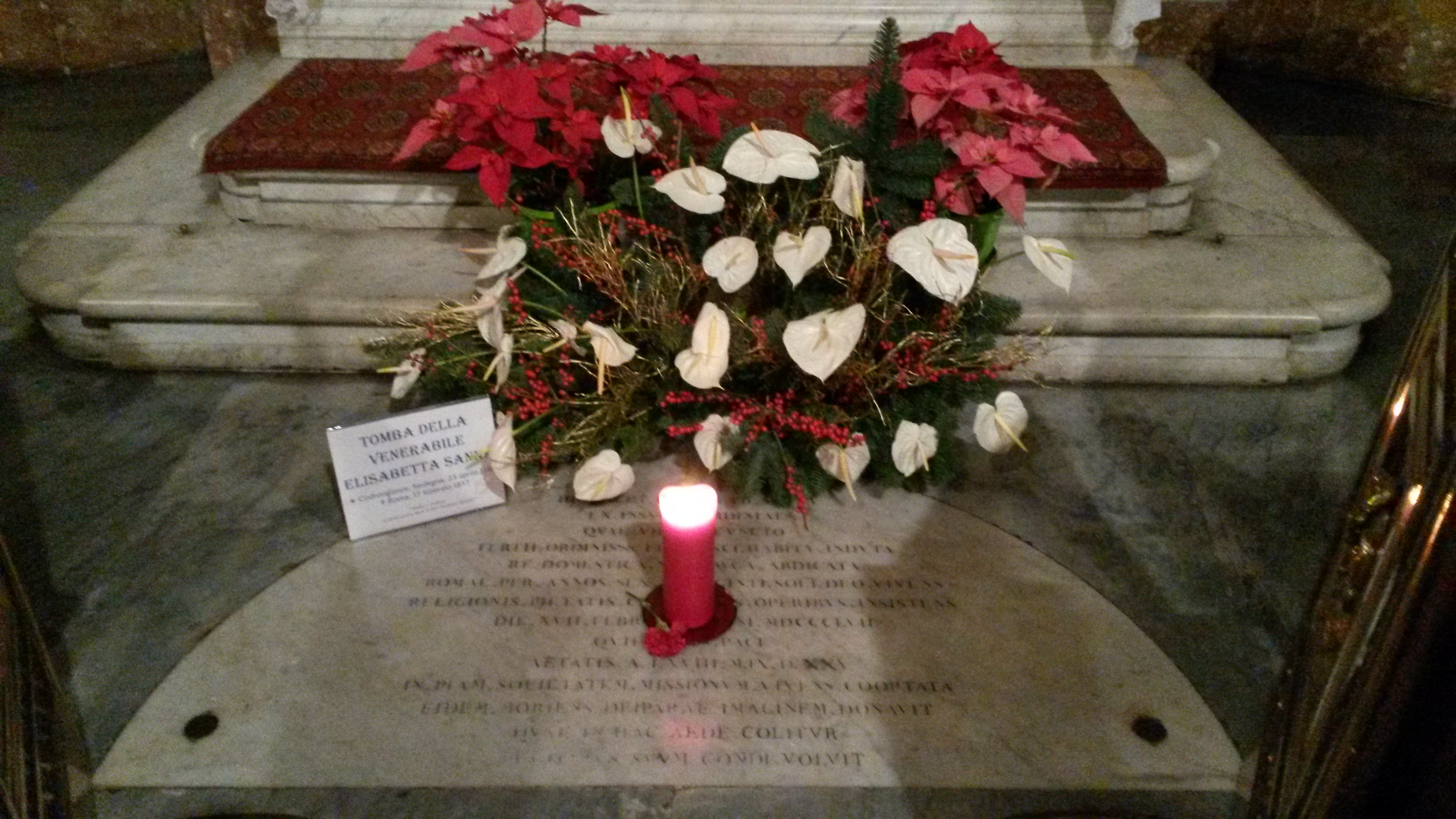
Tomb of Elisabetta Sanna

Elisabetta Sanna died in 1857 and garnered the strong recognition of being a great saint. She was buried in the church of San Salvatore in Onda in Rome.

== Beatification ==
=== Process and Venerable ===
The process for beatification was held on two fronts in both Rome and in Sassari, beginning on 15 June 1857. The cause was formally opened on 22 April 1880 under Pope Leo XIII; this conferred upon Sanna the title Servant of God. Sanna's spiritual writings were approved by theologians on 24 August 1910. The second process was then conducted and was closed before the Congregation of the Causes of Saints revitalized the cause and declared "nihil obstat" (nothing against) to the continuation of the cause on 4 March 1994; on 11 March 1994 the two previous processes were validated so that the next step of the process could commence.

The postulation then submitted the positio to officials for further investigation in 1997 and the cause was moved at once to its historical commission on 22 April 1997 as is the case with older causes. Pope Francis recognized that Sanna had lived a life of heroic virtue on 27 January 2014 and proclaimed that Elisabetta Sanna was therefore venerable.

=== Miracle and beatification ===
A miracle was investigated in the diocese of origin and was validated before it could proceed to the Rome-based medical board; it met and approved the healing as a miracle on 26 March 2015. Theologians followed suit and approved it on 9 June 2015 and transferred it to the members of the Congregation for the Causes of Saints who approved the miracle also on 12 January 2016. The miracle in question concerned a Brazilian girl in 2008 who contracted an aggressive arm tumor and was cured of it as a result of the intercession of Sanna. Pope Francis approved the miracle on 21 January 2016 and this allowed for Elisabetta Sanna to be beatified. On 25 January 2016, it was made public that the potential dates were either 17, 18 or 25 September 2016. Cardinal Angelo Amato presided over the beatification on the pontiff's behalf. The postulator of the cause is Jan Korycki.

== See also ==
- Catholic Church in Italy
- Chronological list of saints and blesseds
- List of beatified people
