= Vagnetti =

Vagnetti is a surname. Notable people with the surname include:

- Fausto Vagnetti (1876–1954), Italian painter
- Marino Vagnetti (1924–?), Sammarinese politician
- Reidar Vågnes (born 1950), Norwegian football coach and former player
