= Filippo Prosperi =

Italian painter (1831–1913)

Filippo Prosperi (July 21, 1831 – 1913) was an Italian painter, mainly of sacred subjects, painted in a Neoclassical and Nazarene styles.

== Biography ==
He was born in Artena. His family had hoped he had chosen a career as a doctor, and for that purpose he was sent to Rome with his paternal uncle for an education. In Rome, he enrolled in philosophy and mathematics at the school of the Apollinare. But he soon gravitated to painting, and worked in the studio of Tommaso Minardi for about six years. In 1857, he was awarded the Clementine Prize for best painting of a human figure for a competition. He completed some designs of works of Raphael in the Vatican that were used for engravings. He also was commissioned to paint frescoes for the churches of the Sanctuary of the Madonna del Divino Amore and of San Salvatore in Onda in Rome. In collaboration with Cesare Mariani, he decorated the church of Santa Lucia del Gonfalone. He was then commissioned in 1862 to fresco the cupola of the restored Vignola Basilica of Santa Maria della Quercia near Viterbo.

In 1872 when the Accademia di San Luca, refused to reform itself into a national institute, the government founded the Institute of Fine Arts at Ripetta. Prosperi was named professor of design and figure. Prosperi also was made honorary associate of various regional academies in Ialy, and named knight, then commendatore of the Order of the Crown of Italy. Among his pupils were Umberto Coromaldi, Giuseppe Sacconi, Fausto Vagnetti, Napoleone Parisani and Giuseppe Zanli.
