= Ittiri =

Ittiri Ìtiri Cannedu (Sardinian)
- Comune
- Comune di Ittiri
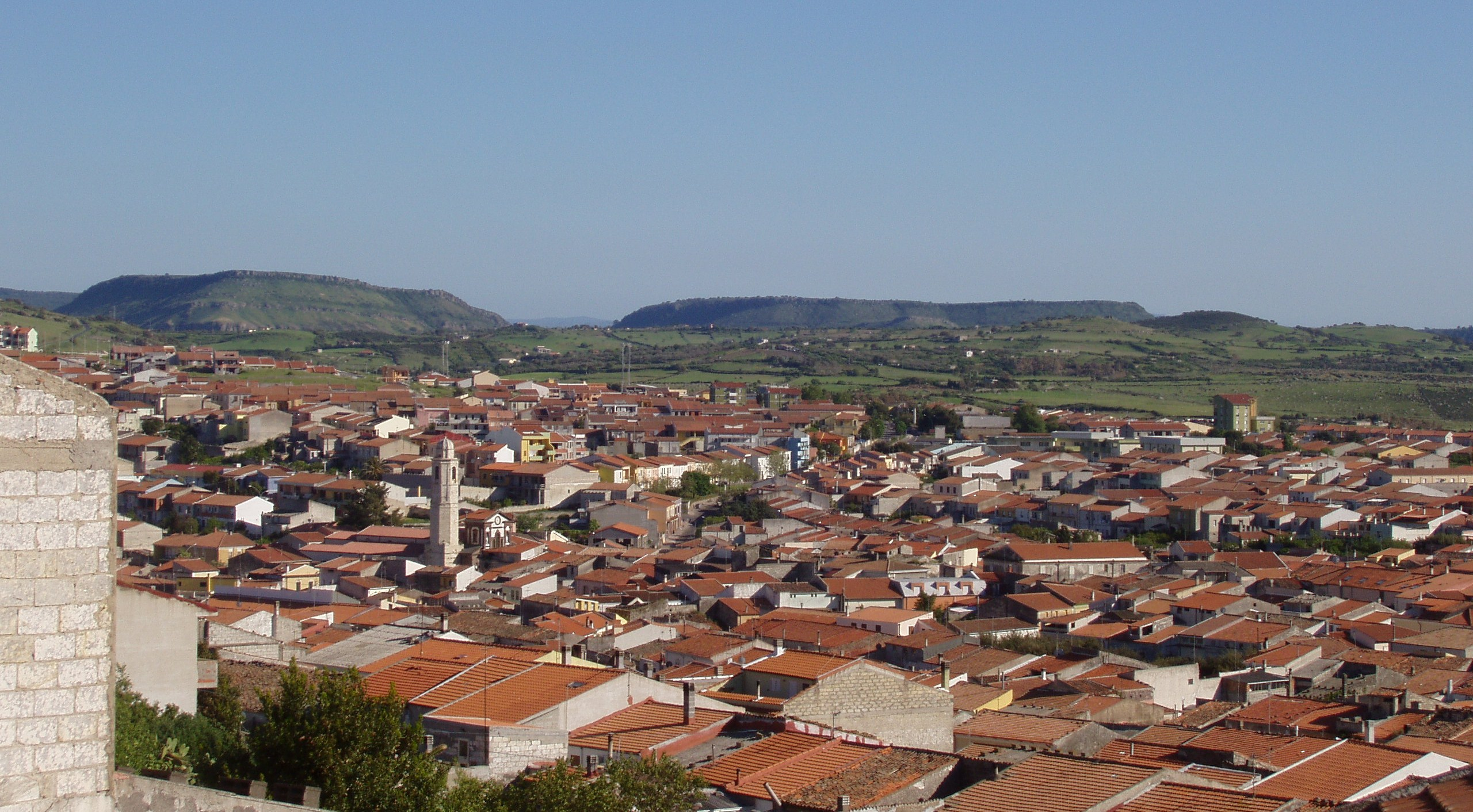
- View of Ittiri

- Location within Sardinia
- Coordinates: 40°36′N 8°34′E
- Country: Italy
- Region: Sardinia
- Metropolitan city: Sassari (SS)

Government
  - Mayor: Baingio Cuccu

Area
  - Total: 111.46 km^{2} (43.03 sq mi)
- Elevation: 400 m (1,300 ft)

Population (2026)
  - Total: 7,730
  - Density: 69.4/km^{2} (180/sq mi)
- Demonym: Ittiresi
- Time zone: UTC+1 (CET)
  - Summer (DST): UTC+2 (CEST)
- Postal code: 07044
- Dialing code: 079
- Patron saint: St. Peter
- Saint day: June 29
- Website: Official website

Ittiri (Sardinian: Ìtiri Cannedu) is a town and comune (municipality) in the Metropolitan City of Sassari in the autonomous island region of Sardinia in Italy, located in the traditional region of Logudoro about 160 kilometres (99 mi) northwest of Cagliari and about 15 kilometres (9 mi) south of Sassari. It has 7,730 inhabitants.

Ittiri borders the municipalities of Banari, Bessude, Florinas, Ossi, Putifigari, Thiesi, Uri, Usini, and Villanova Monteleone.

== Geography ==
Ittiri is located on a plateau at m. 450 on the sea level. The territory, made up of high plateaus mainly of trachytic and basaltic rocks, is rugged, hilly and crossed by valleys destined for cultivation; the most significant mountain ranges are: north-east on the line to Bessude Monte Torru (622 m), Mount Uppas (567 m) and towards Banari Mount Jana (552 m); south to Villanova mount Unturzu (558 m), mountain Alas (517 m), point S'Elighe Entosu (522 m) and mountain Lacusa (503 m).

== Demographics ==
As of 2026, the population is 7,730, of which 49.2% are male, and 50.8% are female. Minors make up 12.6% of the population, and seniors make up 27.3%.

Historical population

Year	Pop.	±%
1861	4,394	—
1871	5,055	+15.0%
1881	5,546	+9.7%
1901	6,979	+25.8%
1911	7,664	+9.8%
1921	7,280	−5.0%
1931	7,829	+7.5%
1936	7,971	+1.8%

Year	Pop.	±%
1951	8,860	+11.2%
1961	8,617	−2.7%
1971	8,821	+2.4%
1981	9,303	+5.5%
1991	9,267	−0.4%
2001	9,050	−2.3%
2011	8,868	−2.0%
2021	8,097	−8.7%

Source: ISTAT

=== Immigration ===
As of 2025, immigrants make up 3.0% of the population. The 5 largest foreign countries of birth are Morocco, France, Germany, Belgium, and China.

== Main sights ==
Characteristic is the historical center where there are several baroque palaces in liberty / deco style with particular balconies and façades of houses embellished by the Ittcherian trachyte; many streets in the center are still paved and in particular the high part of Via Cavour is cobbled.

- Church of San Pietro in Vincoli (13th century, bell tower of 18th century, façade of 19th century).
- Church of San Francesco, former Franciscan convent with a restored Franciscan library annexed.
- Cistercian church of Nostra Signora de Coros, countryside (13th century).
- Cistercian Abbey of Santa Maria de Paulis, countryside (13th century).
- Baronial Palace Sussarellu.
- S'Arcu, old town.
- Hospital G.A. Alivesi (19th century).
- Sa Figu archaeological complex.
- Ochila Necropolis.
- Necropolis and tomb of Musellos.
- Nuraghe Majore of Nuraghe Monte Torru.
- Numerous other nuraghes and Giant tombs sites, and necropolises
- S'Abbadorzu fountain.
- Primary School St. John Bosco.
- Old town with Liberty style façade features.
- Radio museum "Mario Faedda", with annexed antique mill.

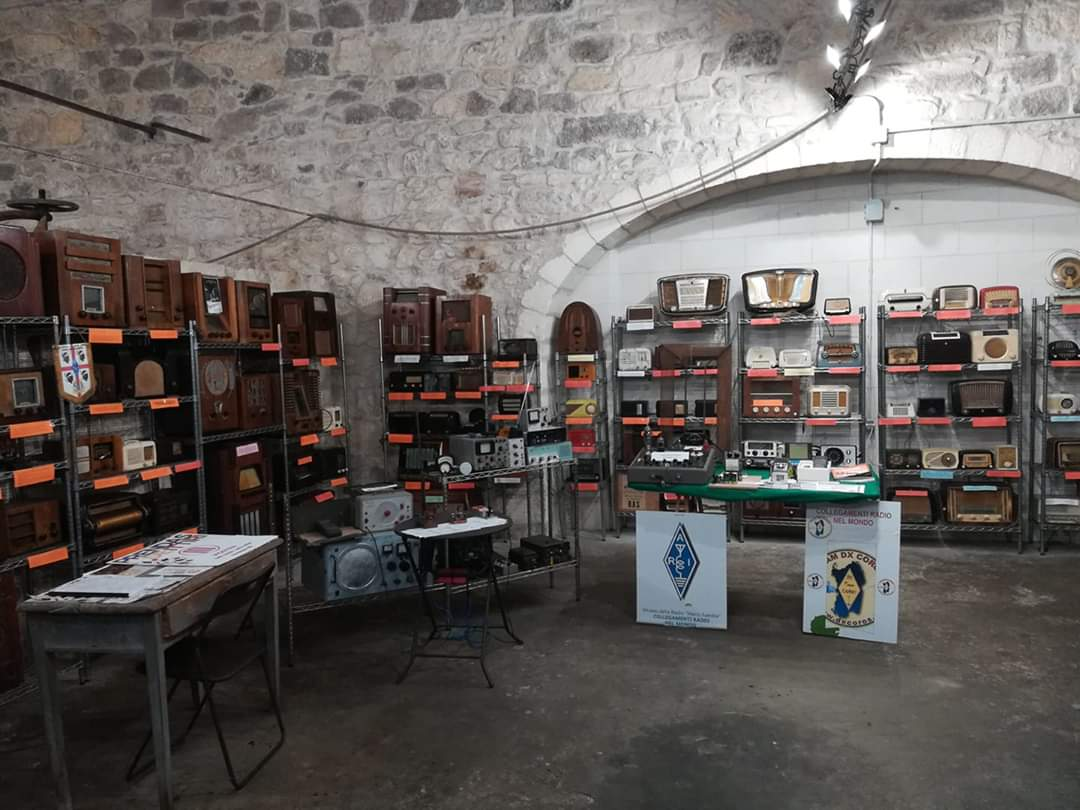
Radio museum "Mario Faedda"

== Honors ==
By decree of April 24, 2000, the President of the Republic granted Ittiri the institutional title of City.

== Economy ==
Ittiri's economy is linked to the agricultural and handicraft sector. There are many farms specializing in the production of vegetables, among which we cite the Sardinian spiky artichoke. In the dairy sector, Ittiri offers a large production of sheep cheese, most exported to United States of America. In the craft sector, at Ittiri there are many companies that produce typical Sardinian sweets, including the famous "Piricchittu" typical sweet originally from Ittiri. In the construction industry, there are many craft businesses, and some deal with local stone processing the trachyte.

== Events ==
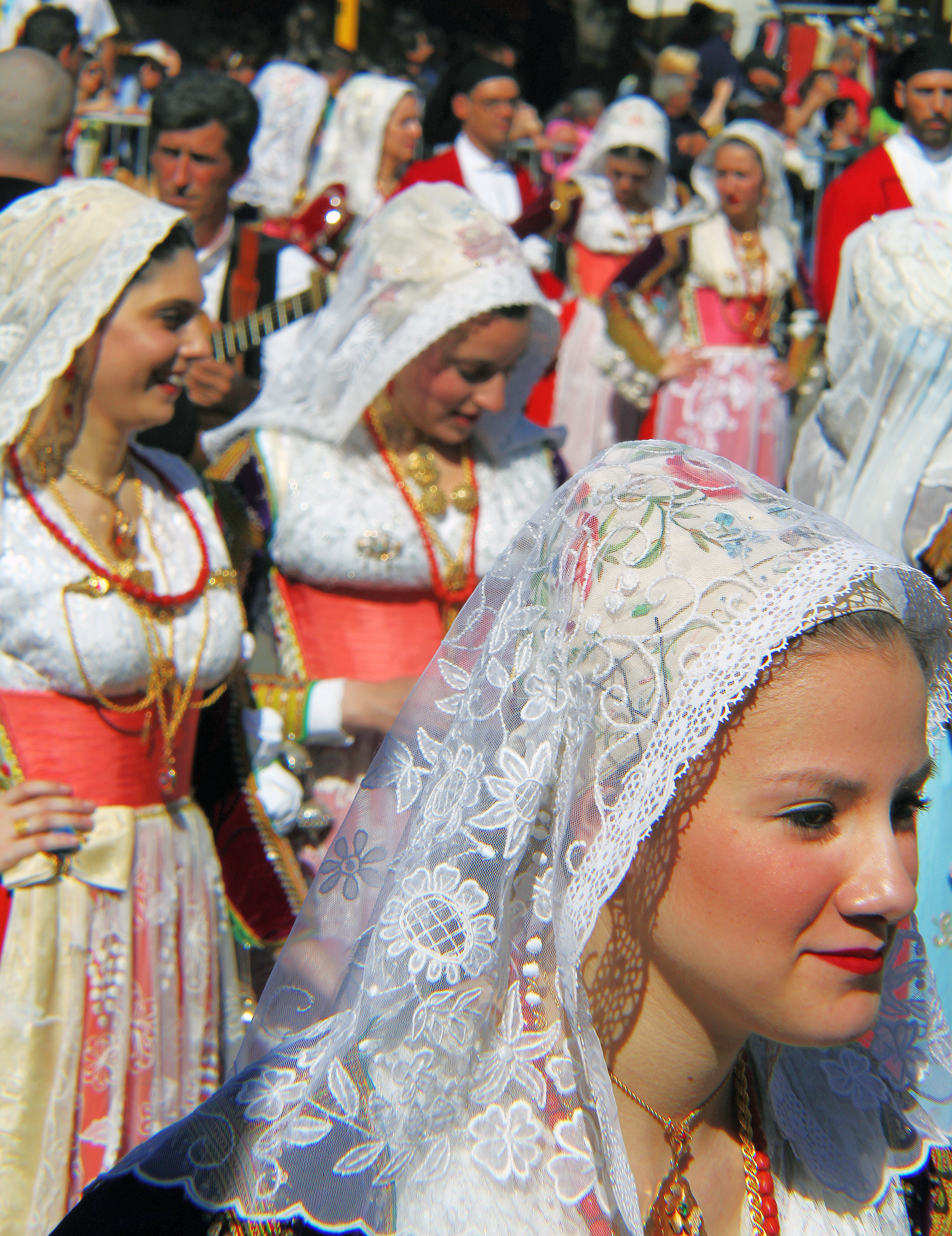
Folk group from Ittiri

- Ittiritmi, the International Music and Ethnic Music Festival (1986), was initially conducted in mid-July, then (since 1991) in the first half of August. The 2015 edition is the 25th edition and every year artists from all over the world perform. For some years, besides music, other artistic forms such as theater, literature and photography have been hosted. The event is organized by the Pro Loco.
- Ittiri Folk Party (since 1986) is generally held in the third week of July. International exhibition of popular music and folk dances, parade in the streets of the city, exhibition of antiques, exhibition and tasting typical local products. The show came to the 32nd edition in 2017 and is organized by the Folklore Association Ittiri Cannedu.
- Prendas (jewels) de Ittiri (2006, late March - early April), the fair of the agro-food products and the Ittirian handicrafts.
- The biennial of trachyte (since 1994), where numerous sculptures have been exhibited in streets and squares.
- Rock 'n' wine, an event that combines a regional wine show (about 40 guest cellars) with the emerging rock band music of northern Sardinia, takes place in the first week of July.
- Cantigos de sos tres Re (since 2003), an itinerant event on the hustle and bustle of ancient traditions, takes place during the Christmas season (last Saturday of December) and is handled by the Boghes and Ammentos Cultural Association.
- CantInCoro (since 1989), Sardinian Cori Traditional Show of Sardinia, organized by the Istituto Folkloristico Cultural Choir of Ittiri, usually takes place on Saturday before Christmas.
- Ittirese Carnival with parades and parties; Summer carnival (from 2013).
- Field Day Coros, amateur radio gathering (since 2014 takes place in September at the Sanctuary of Coros).
