= Muros, Sardinia =

Muros
- Comune
- Comune di Muros
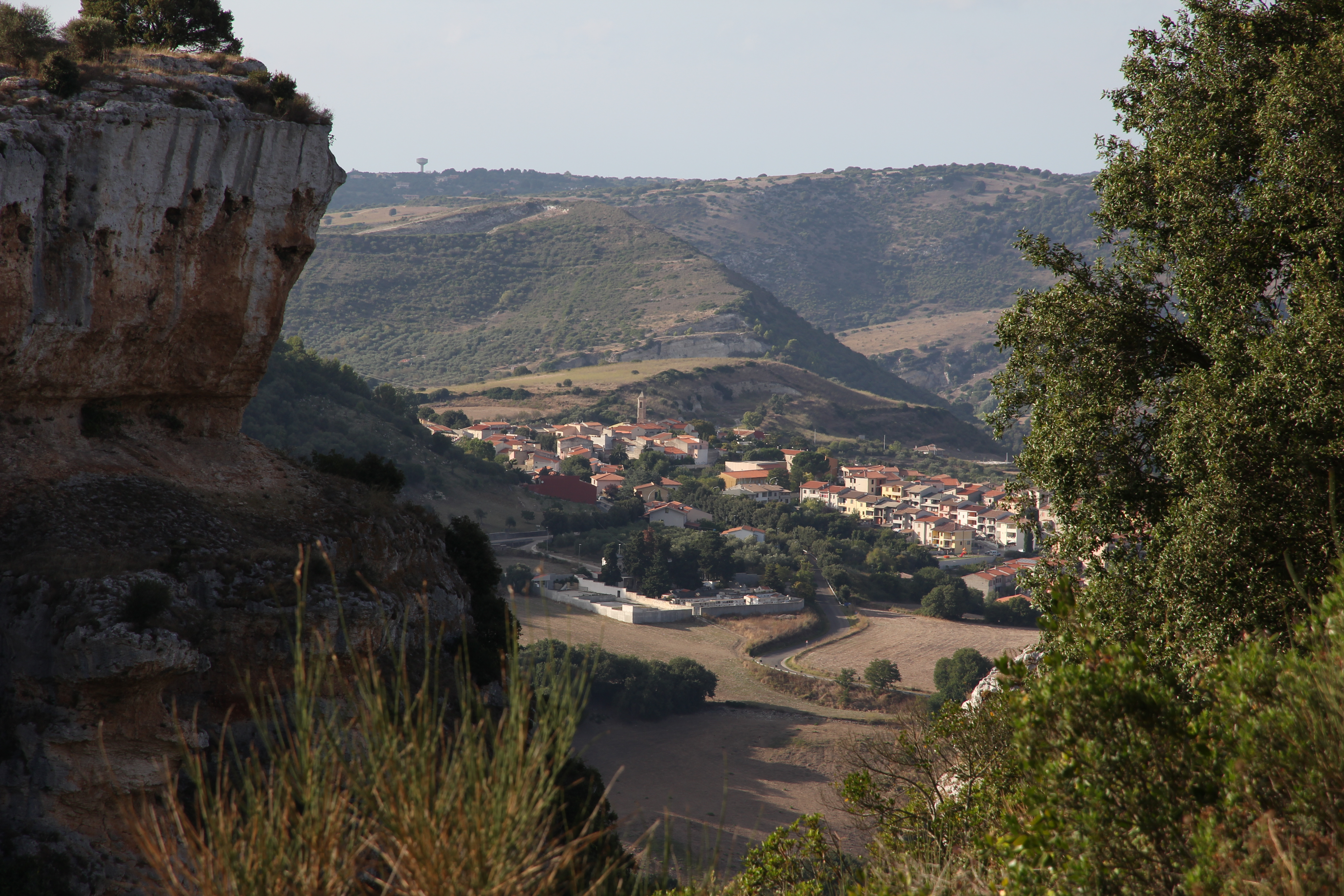
- View of Muros

- Location within Sardinia
- Coordinates: 40°41′N 8°37′E
- Country: Italy
- Region: Sardinia
- Metropolitan city: Sassari (SS)

Area
  - Total: 11.23 km^{2} (4.34 sq mi)

Population (2026)
  - Total: 822
  - Density: 73.2/km^{2} (190/sq mi)
- Time zone: UTC+1 (CET)
  - Summer (DST): UTC+2 (CEST)
- Postal code: 07030
- Dialing code: 079

Muros (Sardinian for 'walls') is a town and comune (municipality) in the Metropolitan City of Sassari in the autonomous island region of Sardinia in Italy, located about 170 kilometres (110 mi) north of Cagliari and about 8 kilometres (5 mi) southeast of Sassari. It has 822 inhabitants.

Muros borders the municipalities of Cargeghe, Osilo, Ossi, and Sassari.

== Demographics ==
As of 2026, the population is 822, of which 49.6% are male, and 50.4% are female. Minors make up 14.6% of the population, and seniors make up 22.5%.

Historical population

Year	Pop.	±%
1861	314	—
1871	357	+13.7%
1881	343	−3.9%
1901	399	+16.3%
1911	489	+22.6%
1921	485	−0.8%
1931	484	−0.2%
1936	468	−3.3%

Year	Pop.	±%
1951	529	+13.0%
1961	591	+11.7%
1971	608	+2.9%
1981	685	+12.7%
1991	775	+13.1%
2001	754	−2.7%
2011	837	+11.0%
2021	830	−0.8%

Source: ISTAT

=== Immigration ===
As of 2025, immigrants make up 3.8% of the population. The 5 largest foreign countries of birth are Germany, Morocco, Tunisia, Belgium, and Romania.
