= Luigi Pallotti =

Italian prelate

His Eminence Luigi Pallotti
- Prefect of the Apostolic Signatura
- Church: Roman Catholic Church
- Appointed: 20 February 1889
- Term ended: 31 July 1890
- Predecessor: Isidoro Verga
- Successor: Vincenzo Vannutelli
- Other post: Cardinal-Deacon of Santa Maria ad Martyres (1887-90)
- Previous posts: Secretary of the Congregation for Studies (1877-80); Substitute for General Affairs (1880-82); Secretary of the Congregation for Extraordinary Ecclesiastical Affairs (1882-85)

Orders
- Created cardinal: 23 May 1887 by Pope Leo XIII
- Rank: Cardinal-Deacon

Personal details
- Born: Luigi Pallotti; 30 March 1829 Albano Laziale, Papal States
- Died: 31 July 1890 (aged 61) Rome, Kingdom of Italy
- Buried: Campo Verano
- Education: Roman College

Luigi Pallotti (30 March 1829 – 31 July 1890) was an Italian prelate of the Catholic Church who worked for a time in the diplomatic service of the Holy See and then in the Roman Curia. He was made a cardinal in 1887.

He was the nephew of Saint Vincent Pallotti (1795–1850), founder of the Pallottines.

== Biography ==
Luigi Pallotti was born in Albano in the Papal States on 30 March 1829. He studied at Collegio Romano and became secretary to Cardinal Karl August von Reisach. He participated in several diplomatic missions of the Holy See, among them as auditor in the nunciature in Spain in 1857, representing Pope Pius IX at the baptism of future King Alfonso XIII in 1886, and joining in the negotiations leading to the Spanish concordat of 1867. The date of his ordination is unknown. He was a junior staff member (assegnatore dei posti) at the First Vatican Council.

Pope Pius IX named him secretary of the Congregation of Studies, where he served from 15 March 1877 to 16 November 1880, the first years of Pope Leo XIII. He was Prefect of Studies at the Roman Seminary from 1879 to 1880.

He was Substitute for General Affairs of the Secretariat of State and secretary of the cipher, (Note: The secretary of the cipher was responsible for the encryption of messages between the Secretariat of State and papal nuncios and delegates.) beginning 16 November 1880.

On 29 October 1882, he became Secretary of the Congregation of Extraordinary Ecclesiastical Affairs.

On 31 July 1885, he was appointed auditor of the Apostolic Camera.

Pope Leo made him a cardinal on 23 May 1887. He received his red biretta and was assigned the deaconry of Santa Maria ad Martyres on 26 May 1887.

On 20 February 1889, Pope Leo named him Prefect of the Apostolic Signatura.

He died of a heart attack in Rome on 3 April 1893.
