= Codrongianos =

Codrongianos Codronzanu (Sardinian) Codronzanos (Sardinian)
- Comune
- Comune di Codrongianos
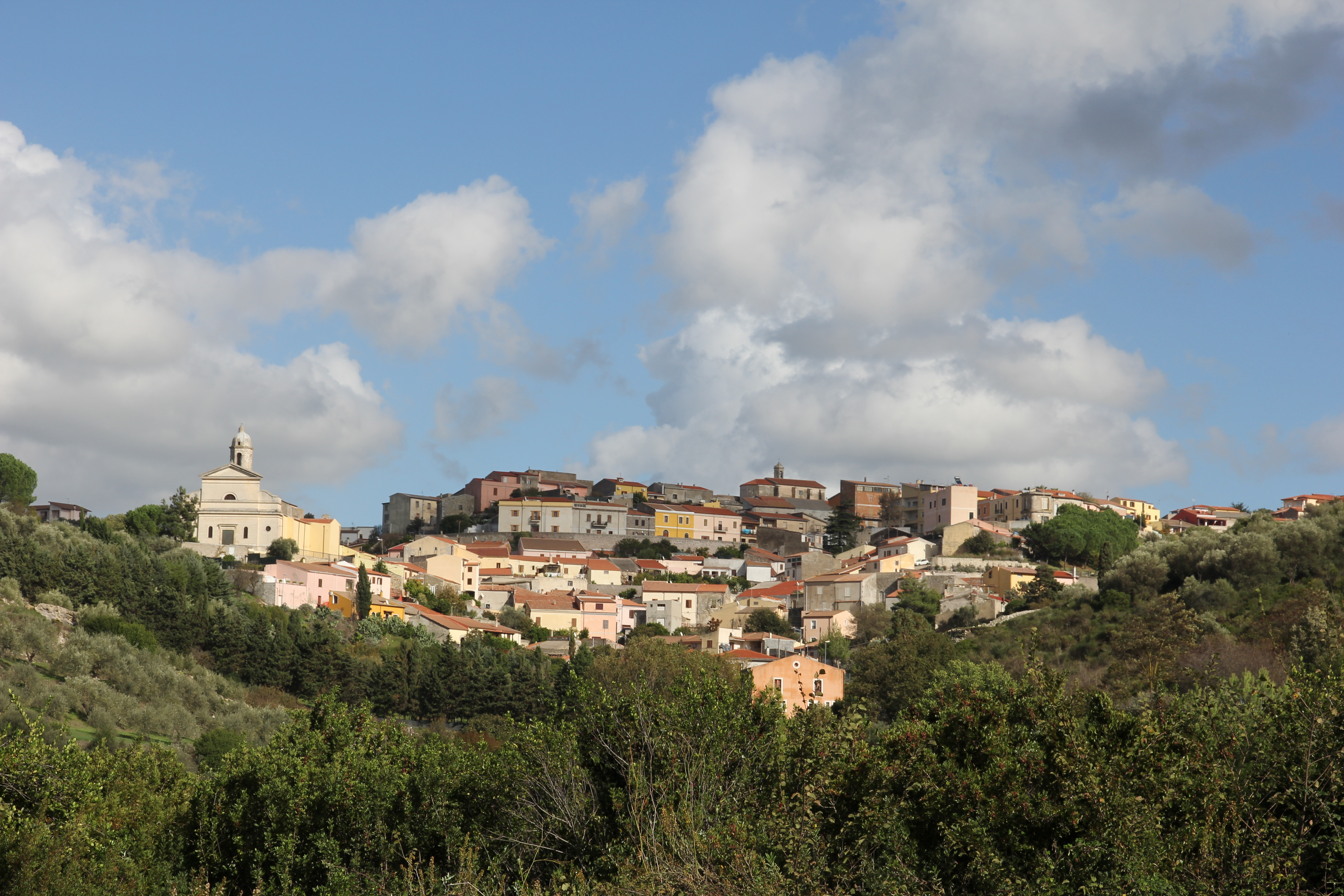
- View of Codrongianos

- Coat of arms

- Location within Sardinia
- Coordinates: 40°40′N 8°41′E
- Country: Italy
- Region: Sardinia
- Metropolitan city: Sassari (SS)

Government
  - Mayor: Luciano Betza

Area
  - Total: 30.39 km^{2} (11.73 sq mi)
- Elevation: 317 m (1,040 ft)

Population (2026)
  - Total: 1,252
  - Density: 41.20/km^{2} (106.7/sq mi)
- Demonym: Codrongianesi
- Time zone: UTC+1 (CET)
  - Summer (DST): UTC+2 (CEST)
- Postal code: 07040
- Dialing code: 079
- Patron saint: St. Paul
- Saint day: June 29
- Website: Official website

Codrongianos (Sardinian: Codronzanu or Codronzanos) is a town and comune (municipality) in the Metropolitan City of Sassari in the autonomous island region of Sardinia in Italy, located about 170 kilometres (110 mi) north of Cagliari and about 13 kilometres (8 mi) southeast of Sassari. It has 1,252 inhabitants.

Codrongianos borders the municipalities of Cargeghe, Florinas, Osilo, Ploaghe, and Siligo.

== Demographics ==
As of 2026, the population is 1,252, of which 49.8% are male, and 50.2% are female. Minors make up 11.5% of the population, and seniors make up 28.0%.

Historical population

Year	Pop.	±%
1861	1,156	—
1871	1,515	+31.1%
1881	1,216	−19.7%
1901	1,151	−5.3%
1911	1,197	+4.0%
1921	1,162	−2.9%
1931	1,154	−0.7%
1936	1,224	+6.1%

Year	Pop.	±%
1951	1,390	+13.6%
1961	1,184	−14.8%
1971	1,171	−1.1%
1981	1,141	−2.6%
1991	1,291	+13.1%
2001	1,281	−0.8%
2011	1,346	+5.1%
2021	1,283	−4.7%

Source: ISTAT

=== Immigration ===
As of 2025, immigrants make up 3.8% of the population. The 5 largest foreign countries of birth are Morocco, Germany, France, Ukraine, and Brazil.

== Main sights ==
- Basilica di Saccargia, one of the most renowned Romanesque churches in Sardinia.
- Static inverter plant of HVDC SACOI, the HVDC-power cable connecting the power grids of Corse and Sardinia with the grid of the Italian mainland.

== Notable people ==
- Blessed Elisabetta Sanna (full name Elisabetta Sanna Porcu) (1788–1857)
