= Florinas =

Florinas Fiolìnas (Sardinian)
- Comune
- Comune di Florinas
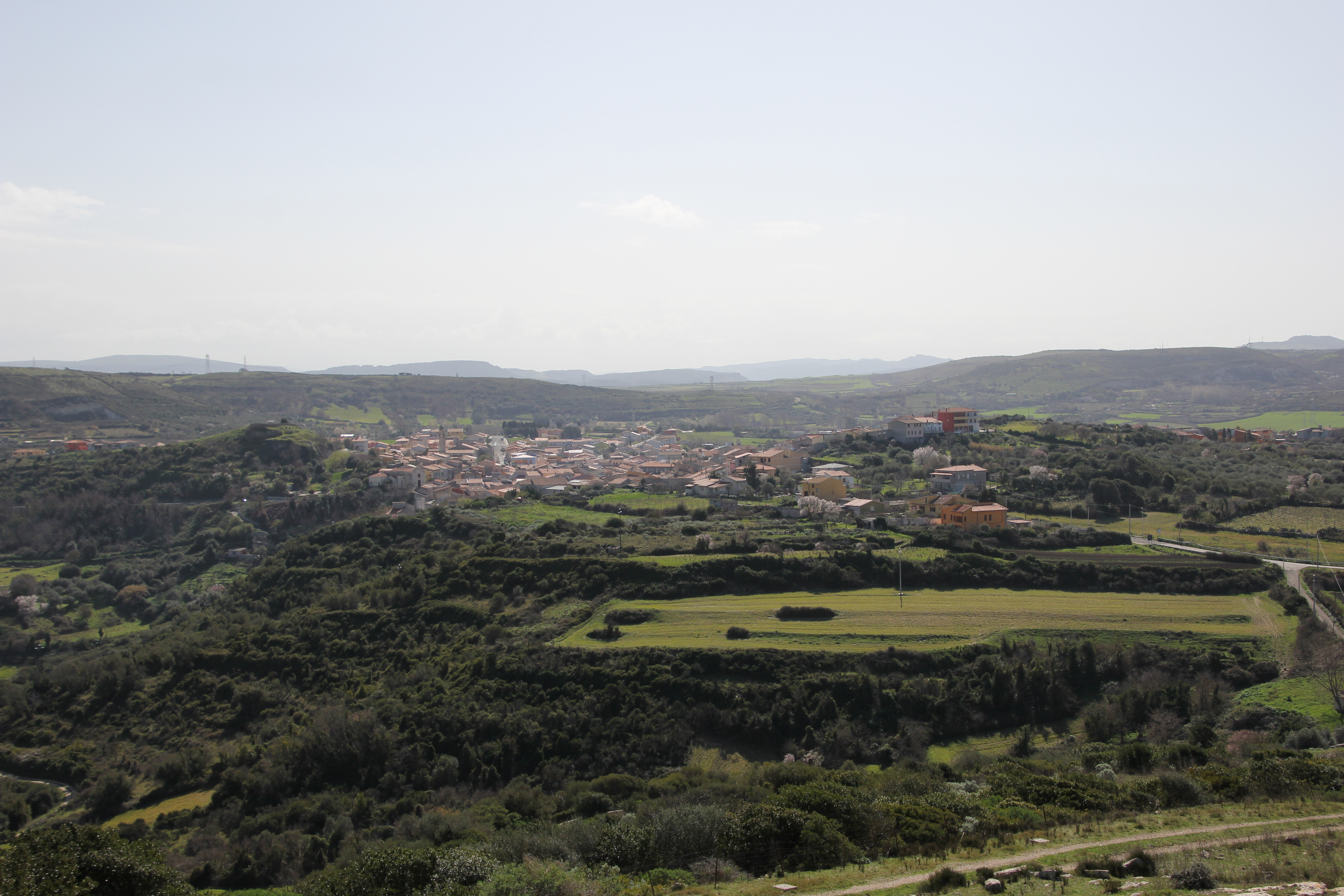
- View of Florinas

- Coat of arms

- Location within Sardinia
- Coordinates: 40°39′N 8°40′E
- Country: Italy
- Region: Sardinia
- Metropolitan city: Sassari (SS)

Government
  - Mayor: Enrico Lobino

Area
  - Total: 36.06 km^{2} (13.92 sq mi)
- Elevation: 417 m (1,368 ft)

Population (2026)
  - Total: 1,459
  - Density: 40.46/km^{2} (104.8/sq mi)
- Demonym: Florinesi
- Time zone: UTC+1 (CET)
  - Summer (DST): UTC+2 (CEST)
- Postal code: 07030
- Dialing code: 079
- Website: Official website

Florinas (Sardinian: Fiolìnas) is a town and comune (municipality) in the Metropolitan City of Sassari in the autonomous island region of Sardinia in Italy, located about 160 kilometres (99 mi) north of Cagliari and about 14 kilometres (9 mi) southeast of Sassari. It has 1,459 inhabitants.

Florinas borders the municipalities of Banari, Cargeghe, Codrongianos, Ittiri, Ossi, and Siligo.

== Demographics ==
As of 2026, the population is 1,459, of which 48.4% are male, and 51.6% are female. Minors make up 13.2% of the population, and seniors make up 27.6%.

Historical population

Year	Pop.	±%
1861	1,941	—
1871	2,241	+15.5%
1881	2,208	−1.5%
1901	2,514	+13.9%
1911	2,519	+0.2%
1921	2,178	−13.5%
1931	2,221	+2.0%
1936	2,229	+0.4%

Year	Pop.	±%
1951	2,162	−3.0%
1961	1,996	−7.7%
1971	1,689	−15.4%
1981	1,581	−6.4%
1991	1,640	+3.7%
2001	1,574	−4.0%
2011	1,547	−1.7%
2021	1,446	−6.5%

Source: ISTAT

=== Immigration ===
As of 2025, immigrants make up 6.1% of the population. The 5 largest foreign countries of birth are Morocco, Belgium, Romania, Germany, and Brazil.

== Sights ==
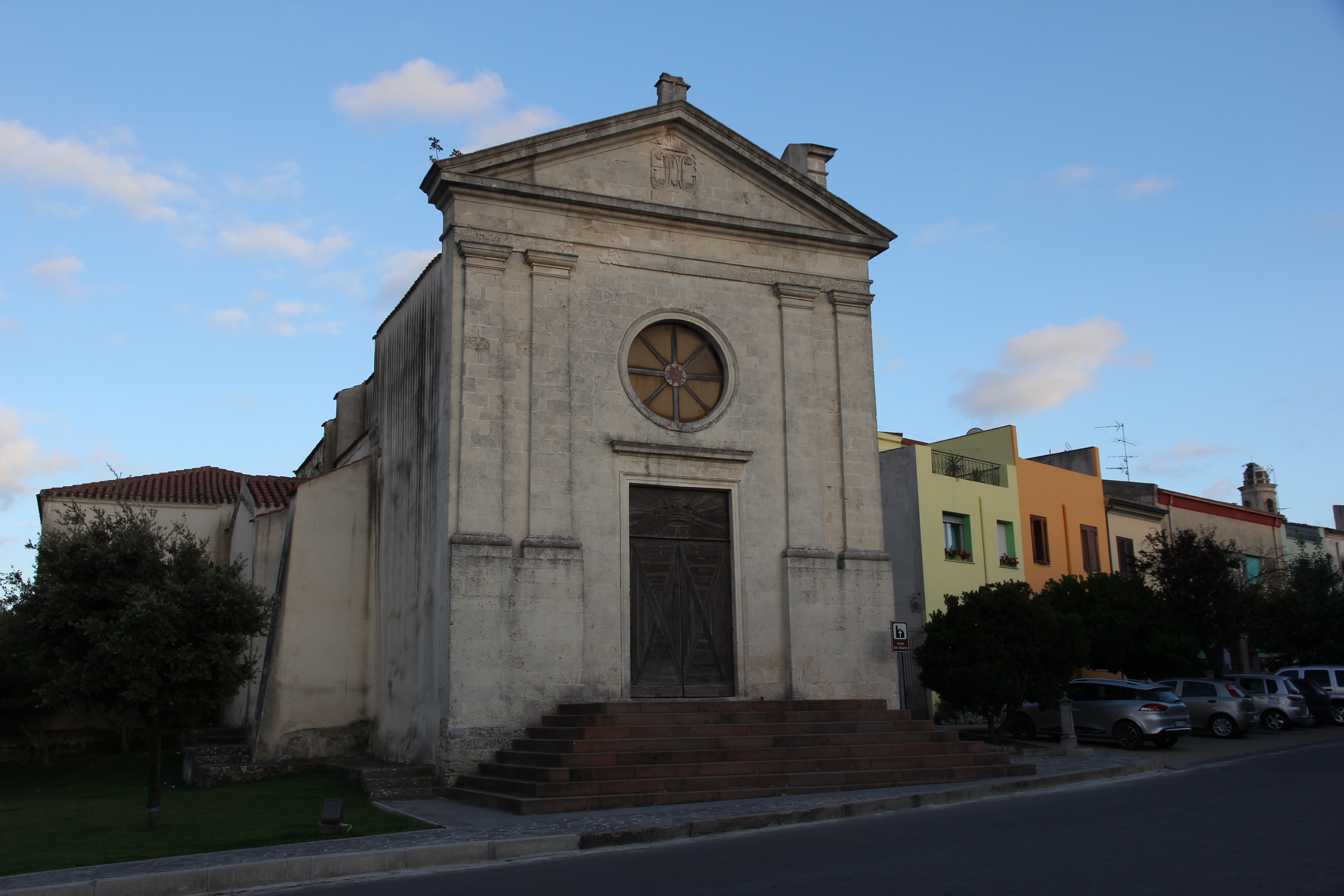
Church of Rosario

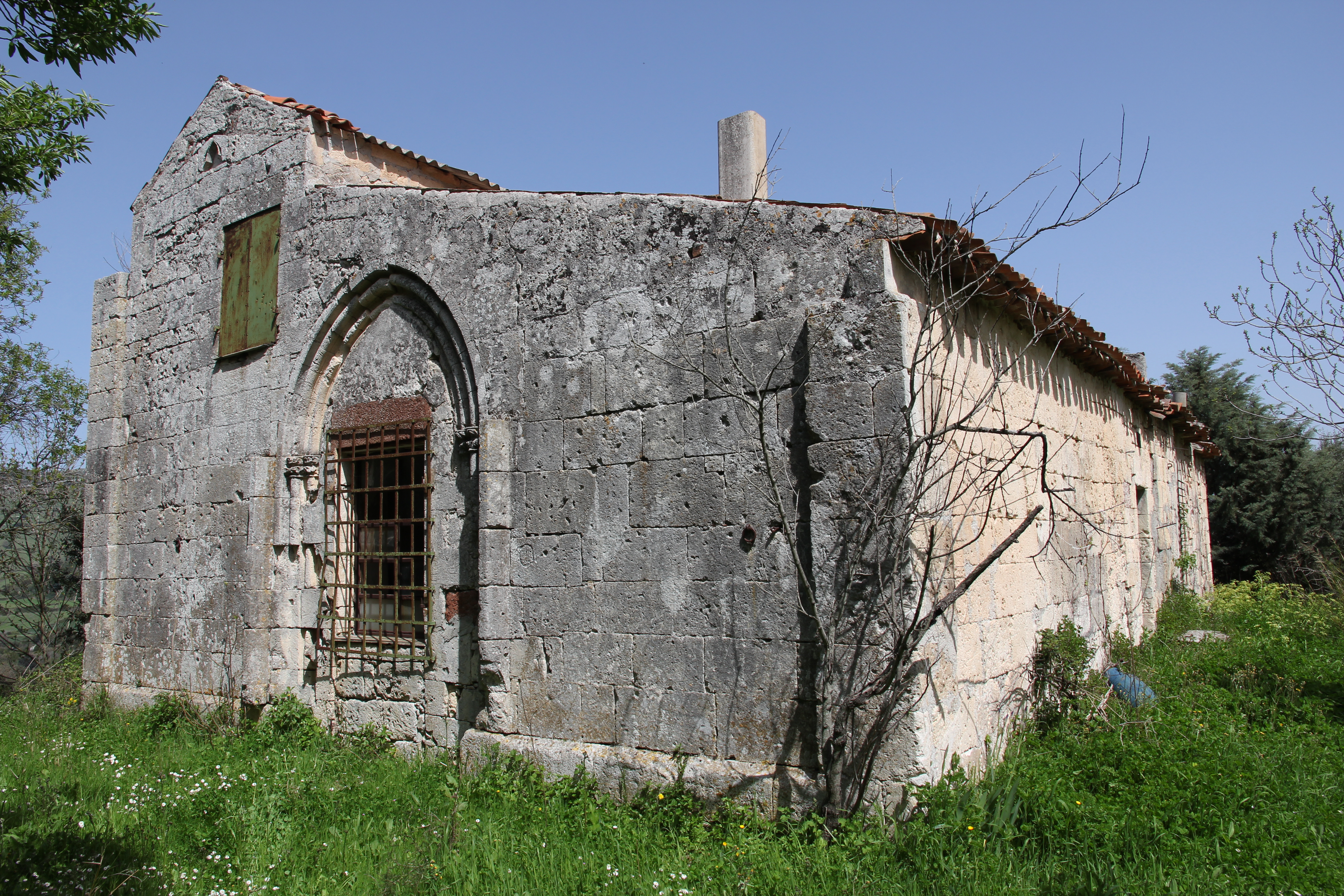
Former church of San Leonardo

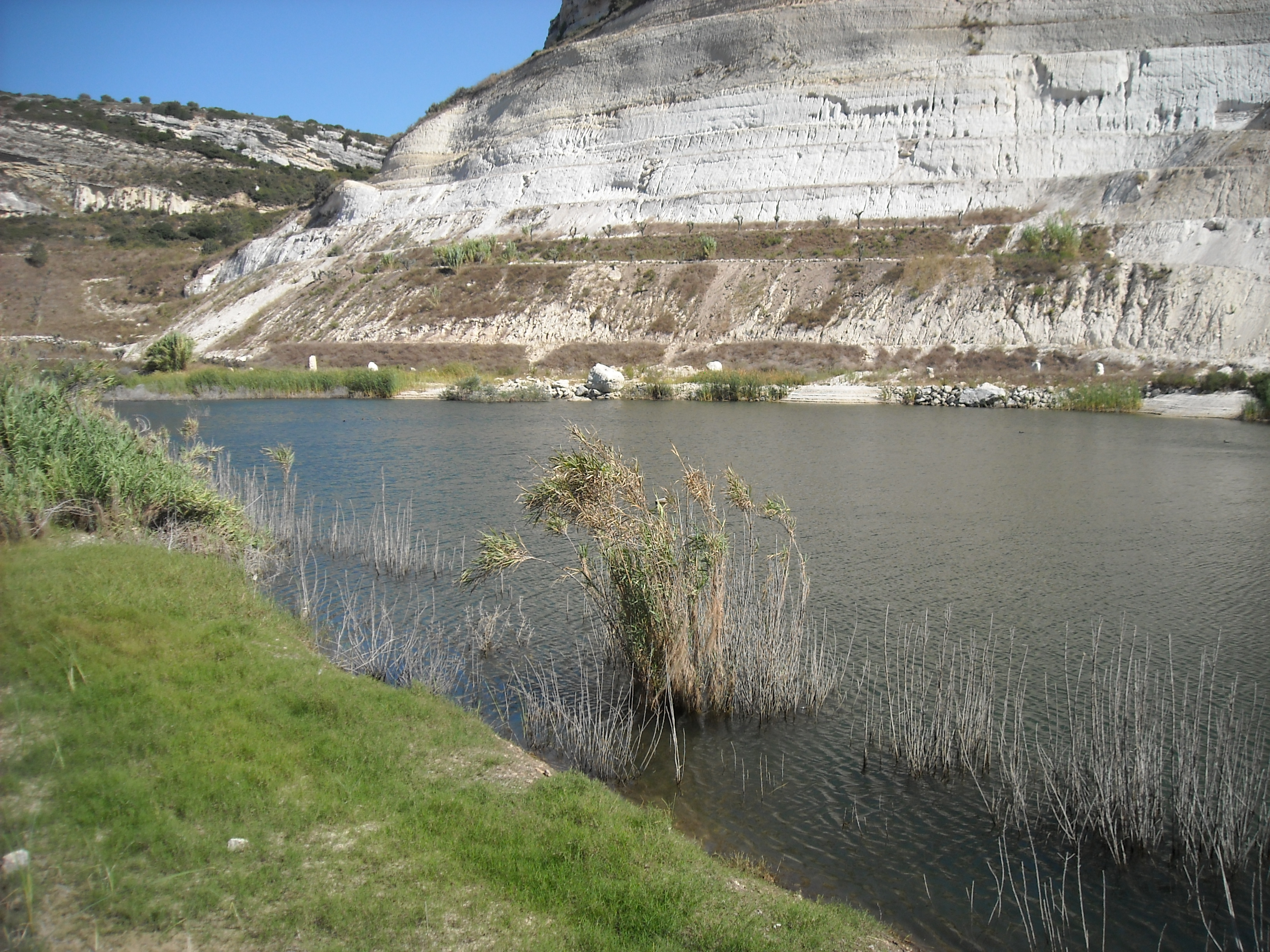
Artificial lake of the Monte de Sa Jana mines

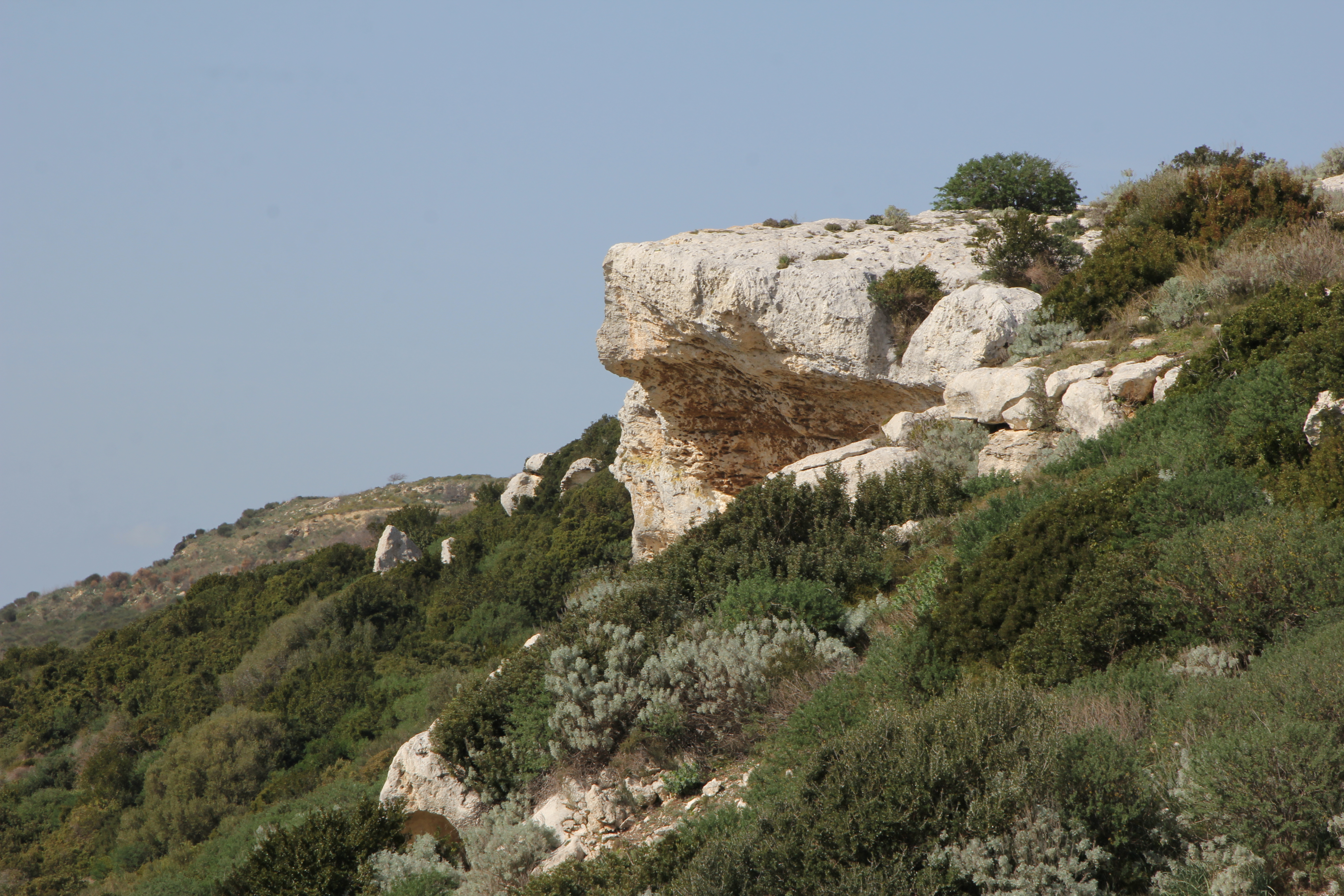
Rock shelter of Sa Cuccutada

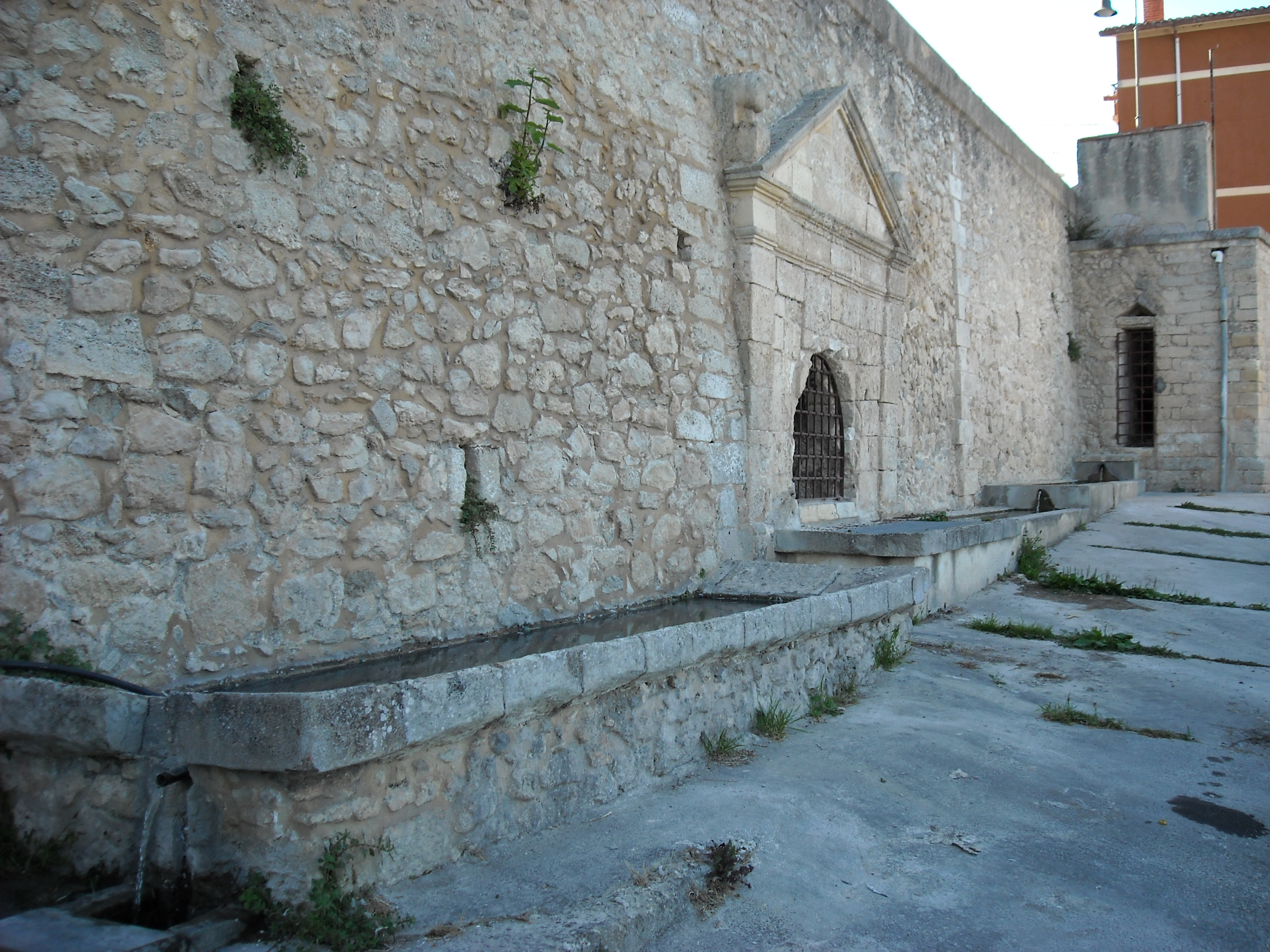
Old warehouse, now with water inside

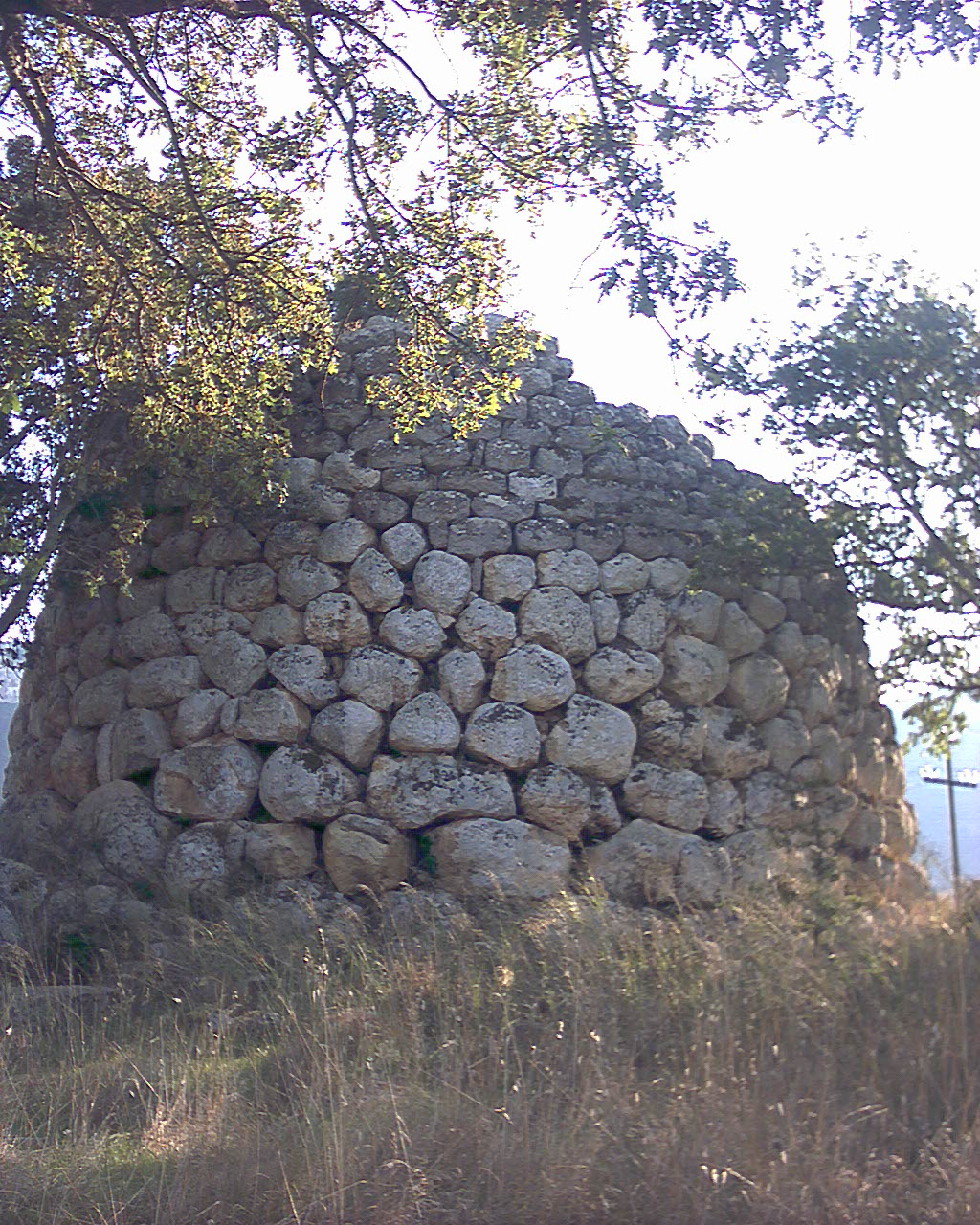
Nuraghe Banari
