= Cargeghe =

Cargeghe Carzèghe (Sardinian)
- Comune
- Comune di Cargeghe
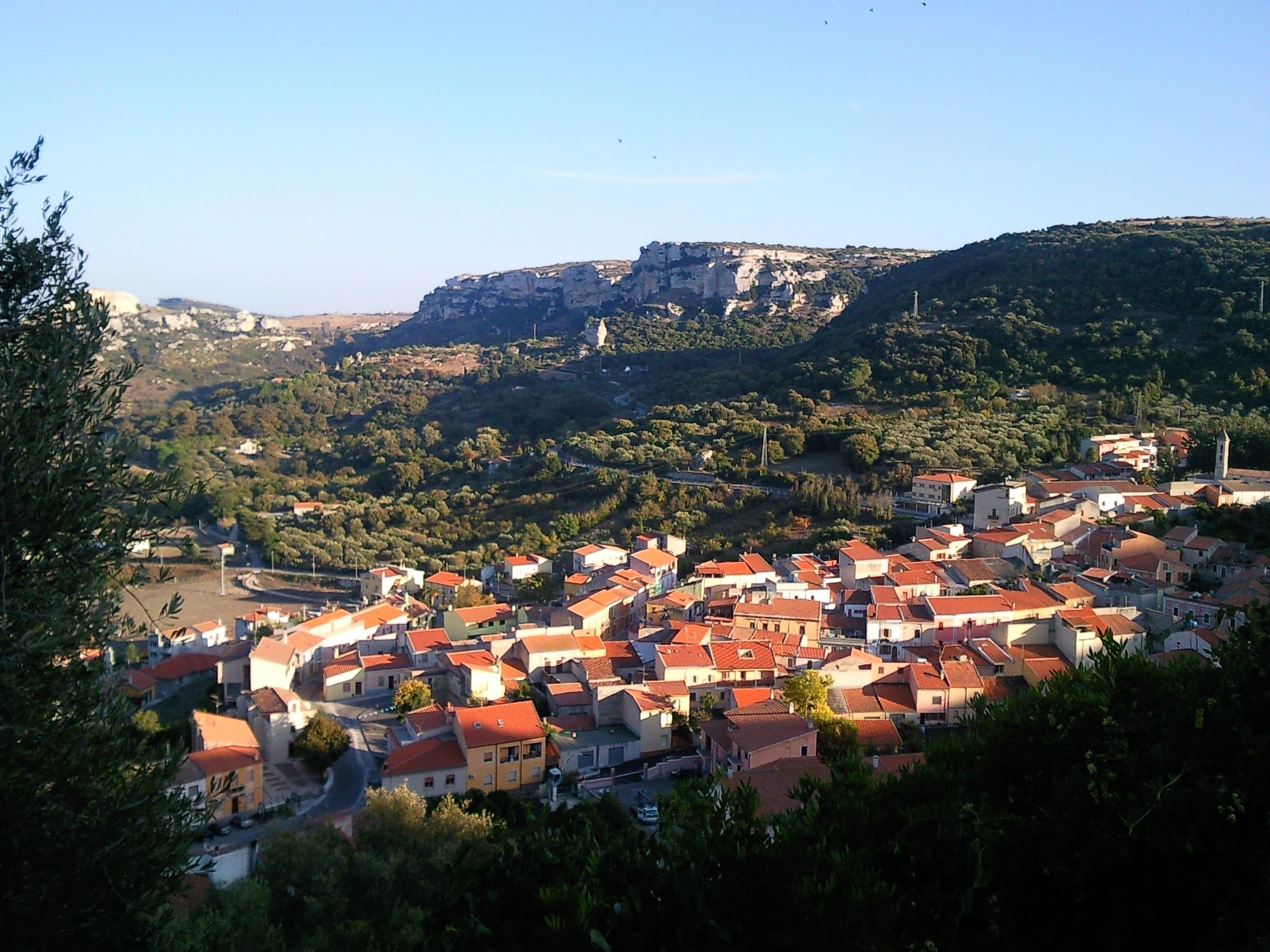
- View of Cargeghe

- Coat of arms

- Location within Sardinia
- Coordinates: 40°40′N 8°37′E
- Country: Italy
- Region: Sardinia
- Metropolitan city: Sassari (SS)

Government
  - Mayor: Franco Spada

Area
  - Total: 12.05 km^{2} (4.65 sq mi)
- Elevation: 333 m (1,093 ft)

Population (2026)
  - Total: 590
  - Density: 49/km^{2} (130/sq mi)
- Demonym: Cargeghesi
- Time zone: UTC+1 (CET)
  - Summer (DST): UTC+2 (CEST)
- Postal code: 07030
- Dialing code: 079
- Website: Official website

Cargeghe (Sardinian: Carzèghe) is a village and comune (municipality) in the Metropolitan City of Sassari in the autonomous island region of Sardinia in Italy, located about 170 kilometres (110 mi) north of Cagliari and about 9 kilometres (6 mi) southeast of Sassari. It has 590 inhabitants.

Sights include the necropolis of S'Elighe Entosu, including a series of domus de janas (Neolithic tombs), the parish church (15th–16th centuries) and the countryside Romanesque church of Santa Maria 'e Contra (12th century).

Cargeghe borders the municipalities of Codrongianos, Florinas, Muros, Osilo, and Ossi.

== Demographics ==
As of 2026, the population is 590, of which 50.8% are male, and 49.2% are female. Minors make up 15.3% of the population, and seniors make up 25.3%.

Historical population

Year	Pop.	±%
1861	463	—
1871	469	+1.3%
1881	491	+4.7%
1901	626	+27.5%
1911	676	+8.0%
1921	608	−10.1%
1931	646	+6.2%
1936	626	−3.1%

Year	Pop.	±%
1951	689	+10.1%
1961	746	+8.3%
1971	684	−8.3%
1981	624	−8.8%
1991	622	−0.3%
2001	606	−2.6%
2011	644	+6.3%
2021	593	−7.9%

Source: ISTAT

=== Immigration ===
As of 2025, immigrants make up 2.2% of the population. The 5 largest foreign countries of birth are the Dominican Republic, Morocco, Romania, Australia, and Belgium.
