= Ossi, Sardinia =

Ossi
- Comune
- Comune di Ossi
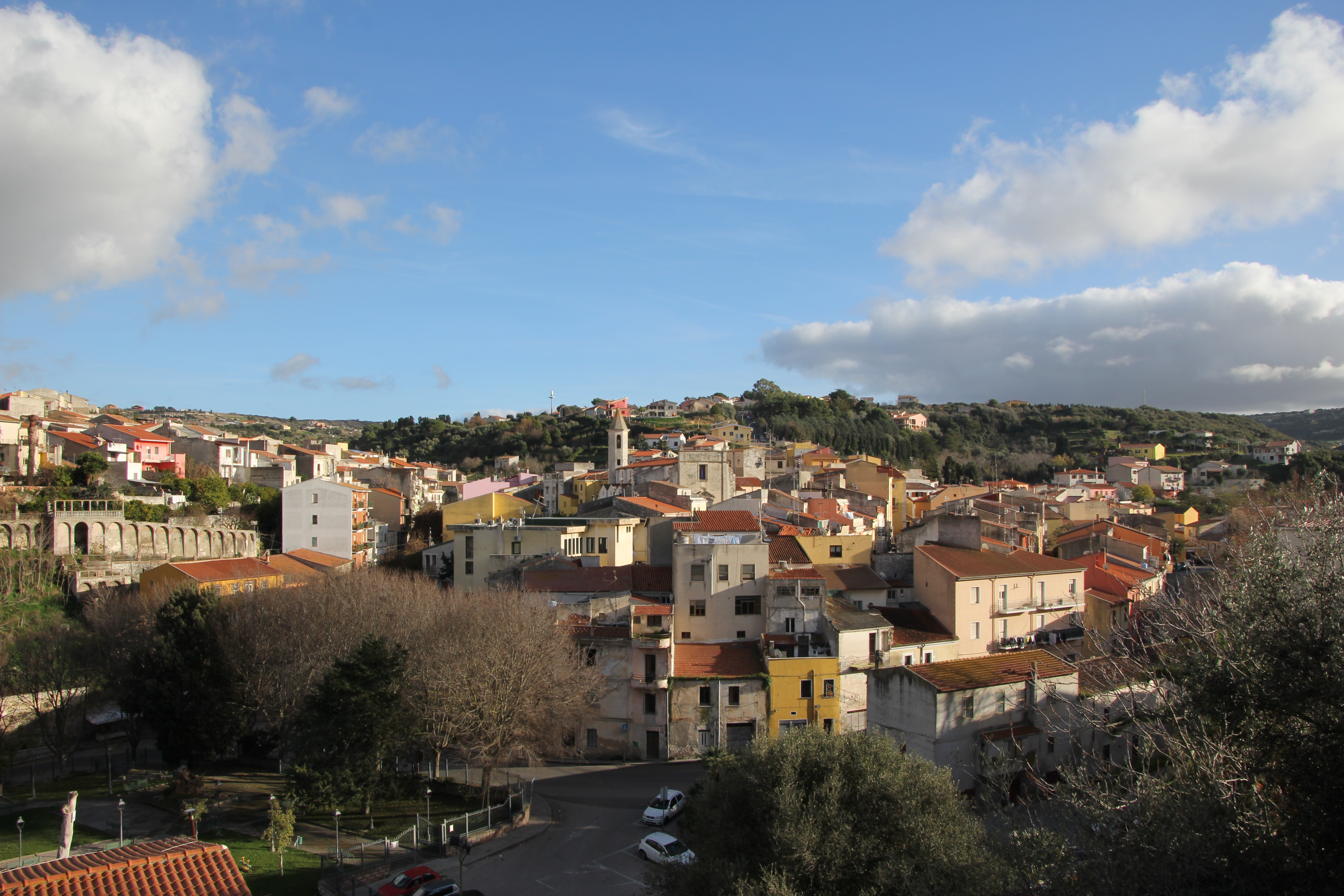
- View of Ossi

- Location within Sardinia
- Coordinates: 40°41′N 8°35′E
- Country: Italy
- Region: Sardinia
- Metropolitan city: Sassari (SS)

Government
  - Mayor: Pasquale Lubinu

Area
  - Total: 30.09 km^{2} (11.62 sq mi)

Population (2026)
  - Total: 5,344
  - Density: 177.6/km^{2} (460.0/sq mi)
- Demonym: Ossesi
- Time zone: UTC+1 (CET)
  - Summer (DST): UTC+2 (CEST)
- Postal code: 07045
- Dialing code: 079
- Patron saint: St. Bartholomew the Apostle
- Saint day: August 24
- Website: Official website

Ossi is a town and comune (municipality) in the Metropolitan City of Sassari in the autonomous island region of Sardinia in Italy, located about 170 kilometres (110 mi) northwest of Cagliari and about 6 kilometres (4 mi) southeast of Sassari in the Logudoro. It has 5,344 inhabitants.

Ossi borders the municipalities of Cargeghe, Florinas, Ittiri, Muros, Sassari, Tissi, and Usini.

Located in the territory is a Domus de Janas, a pre-historic tomb.

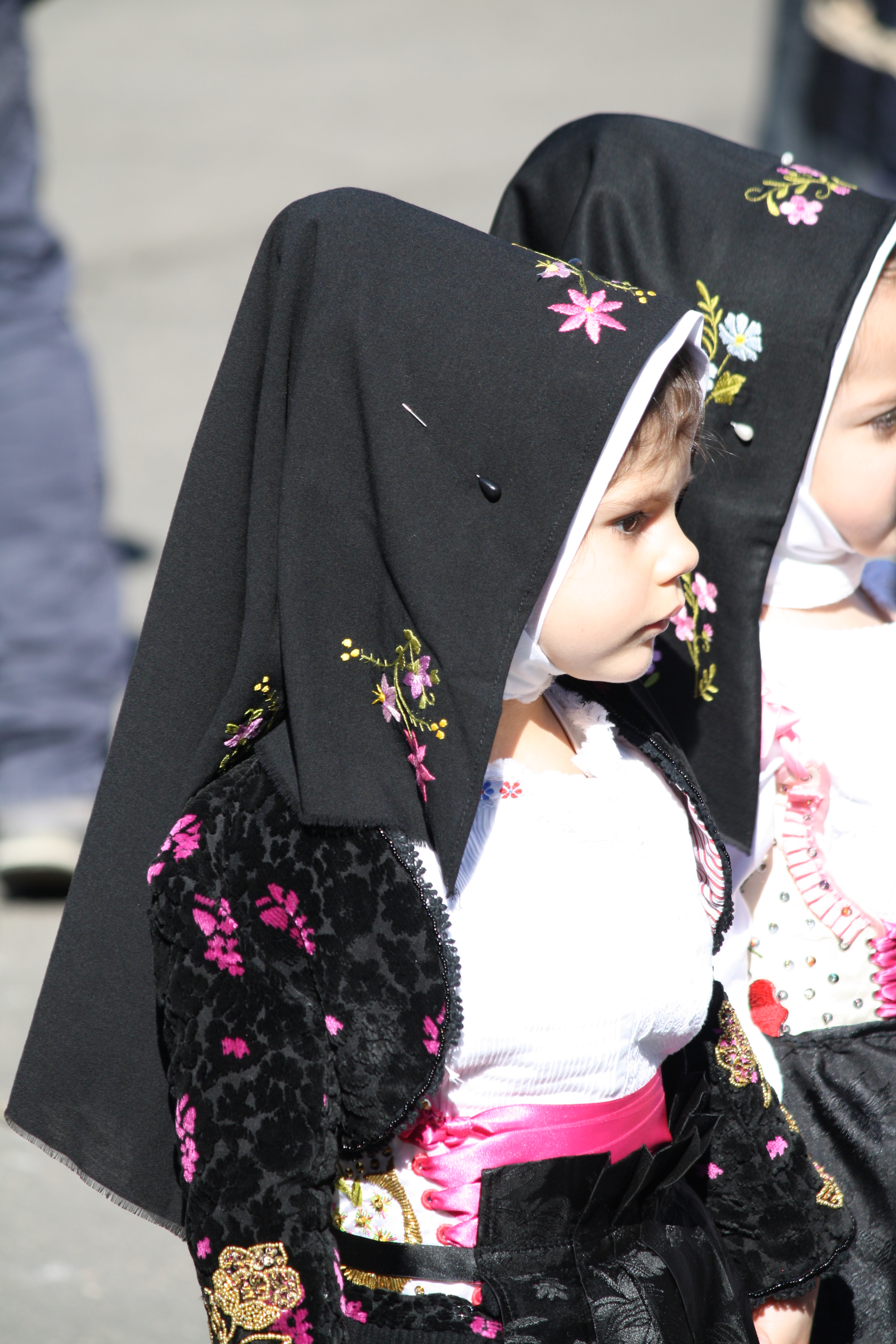
Ossi's folk costume

== Demographics ==
As of 2026, the population is 5,344, of which 49.4% are males, and 50.6% are females. Minors make up 11.9% of the population, and seniors make up 26.8%.

Historical population

Year	Pop.	±%
1861	2,359	—
1871	2,545	+7.9%
1881	2,871	+12.8%
1901	3,066	+6.8%
1911	3,523	+14.9%
1921	3,449	−2.1%
1931	4,013	+16.4%
1936	4,072	+1.5%

Year	Pop.	±%
1951	4,223	+3.7%
1961	4,632	+9.7%
1971	4,982	+7.6%
1981	5,390	+8.2%
1991	5,607	+4.0%
2001	5,735	+2.3%
2011	5,876	+2.5%
2021	5,513	−6.2%

Source: ISTAT

=== Immigration ===
As of 2025, immigrants make up 2.0% of the population. The 5 largest foreign countries of birth are Germany, Brazil, France, Romania, and Ukraine.
