= Umberto Coromaldi =

Italian painter (1870–1948)

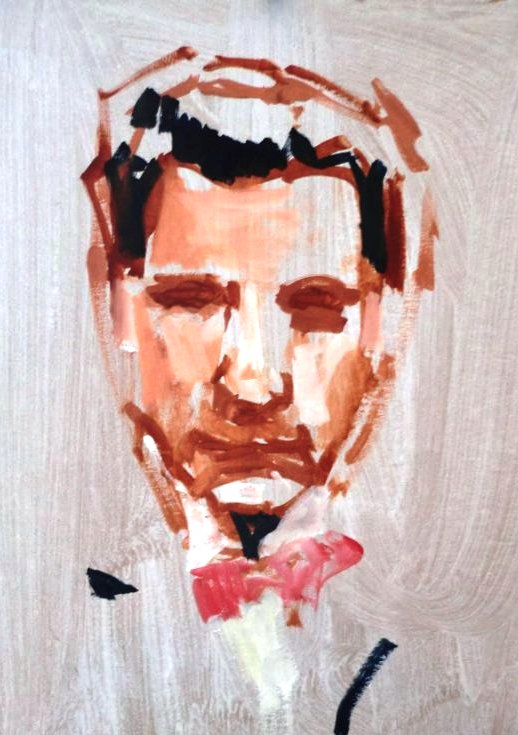
- Portrait of Umberto Coromaldi (2010), by Jerry Ross
- Born: September 21, 1870; Rome, Italy
- Died: October 5, 1948 (aged 78); Rome, Italy
- Education: Accademia di Belle Arti di Roma
- Occupations: Painter, educator

Umberto Coromaldi (September 21, 1870 – October 5, 1948) was an Italian painter and educator, active mainly in his native city of Rome.

== Biography ==
Umberto Coromaldi was born on September 21, 1870, in Rome, to parents Luisa and Vincenzo Celli. His mother was widowed shortly after his birth, then remarried painter Filippo Indoni, who encouraged young Coromaldi to paint.

He then attended the Accademia di Belle Arti di Roma, where he studied drawing under Filippo Prosperi. Subsequently, at the age of twenty-two, he met the Neapolitan painter Antonio Piccinni and also Antonio Mancini whose studio Coromaldi frequented.

== Career ==
He exhibited in Rome for the first time in 1893. In 1894 he won an artistic stipend with, Un Ritorno dei naufragi. With this award, Coromaldi travelled to Paris, Brussels, Antwerp, Monaco, and, in 1895, he exhibited in Stuttgart, where a pastel, "Il cenciaiolo".

On his return to Rome, he began his most prolific period. He consistently participated in annual exhibitions of the Society of Amateurs and Enthusiasts (Italian: Società degli amatori e cultori), where he became a member and had several one-man shows. In 1903 he was present at the Venice Biennale. He continued to exhibit at the Biennale until 1924, when he displayed La donna e lo specchio (Woman and Mirror) (Marangoni Museum, Udine).

In 1905 he joined the group of "twenty-fifth of the Roman Campagna" (Galassi Paluzzi). In the same year he was one of the illustrators, along with G. Balla, D. Cambellotti and others, the volume of E. De Fonseca, Roman Castles, published by the brothers Alinari in Florence.

In 1909 he succeeded his mentor, Prosperi, teaching figure drawing at the Accademia di Belle Arti di Roma. His notable students included Ashot Zorian, Pan Yuliang, Youssef Kamel, Aurel Ciupe, and Ragheb Ayad.

Rome International Exposition in 1911 the artist participated, as well as a Lancellotti (Mountain Shepherds), with a series of panels that made up the figurative decoration of the pavilion of the fishery. He was a master of painting at the Royal House and in 1911 painted a portrait of King Vittorio Emanuele III.

Coromaldi was prolific and successful, exhibiting: Sea bass (1899, St. Louis, USA and 1904, Senigallia, Italy); Happy Mother (1903, exhibited 1905, Munich); I Frattaroli (1907, Rome and 1910, Barcelona), and In the Hut (1908, Brera Academy of Milan); 1908, purchase of the painting The meal time (1908).

In 1909, 1910, 1911, he won awards in Munich, Brussels, Barcelona and Santiago, Chile; in 1912 at Naples for The Devotee (1898); and in 1915 at San Francisco for The Bass.

From 1912 to 1913 he continued to paint subjects with figures. The quantity and quality of his production decreased in later years, the number of works, from the second decade of the century, he devoted himself more and more exclusive pictures of animals. Coromaldi was president of the Academy of San Luca in Rome and member of the Brera and Academy of Parma.

The picture that marked the success of Coromaldi "Ritorno dei naufraghi ", is a work in composition and technical performance that refers explicitly to the art of Francesco Paolo Michetti. Works of Coromaldi are exhibited in galleries of modern art in Rome, Florence, Milan, Palermo, Accademia di S. Luca in Rome; Revoltella Museum in Trieste.

He died on October 5, 1948, in Rome.
