= San Salvatore in Onda =

Church in Rome, Italy

Coordinates: 41.8930°N 12.4715°E

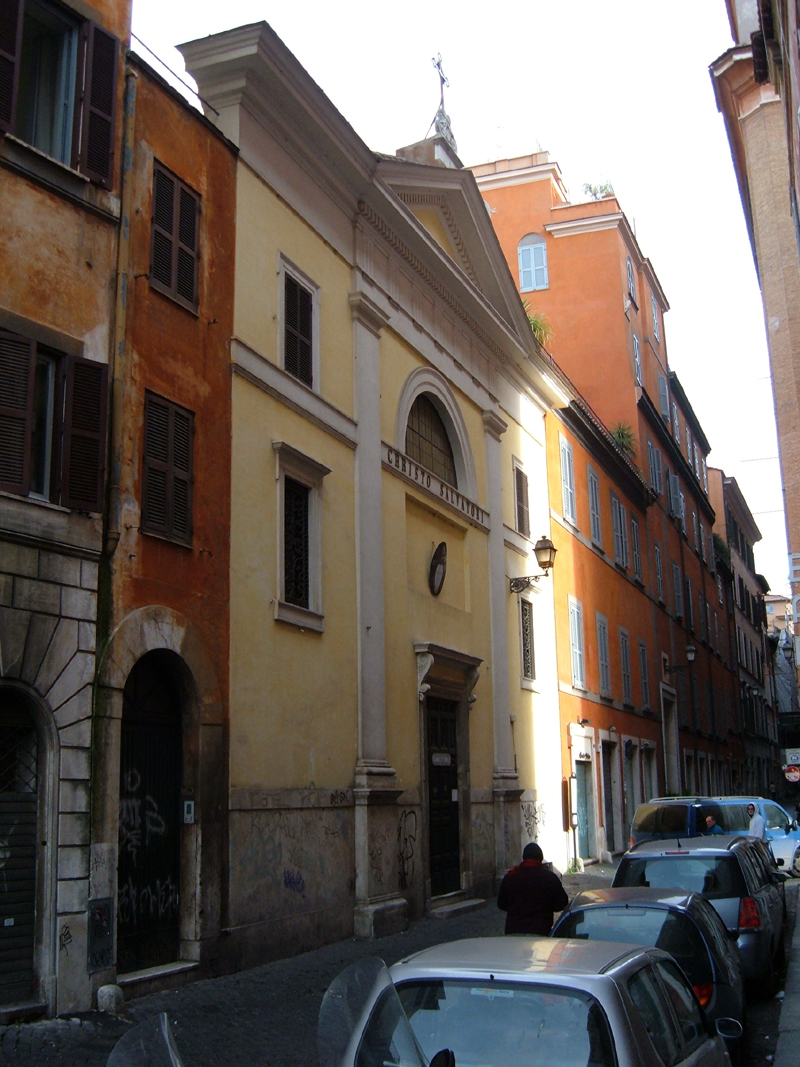

Religion
- Affiliation: Roman Catholic

Location
- Location: Rome, Italy
- Interactive map of San Salvatore in Onda

Architecture
- Type: Church
- Groundbreaking: 11th century
- Completed: 19th century (reconstruction)

San Salvatore in Onda is a Roman Catholic church, located on via dei Pettinari #56-58, in rione Regola of Rome, Italy. The church is about a block southwest along the via from the church of Santissima Trinità dei Pellegrini.

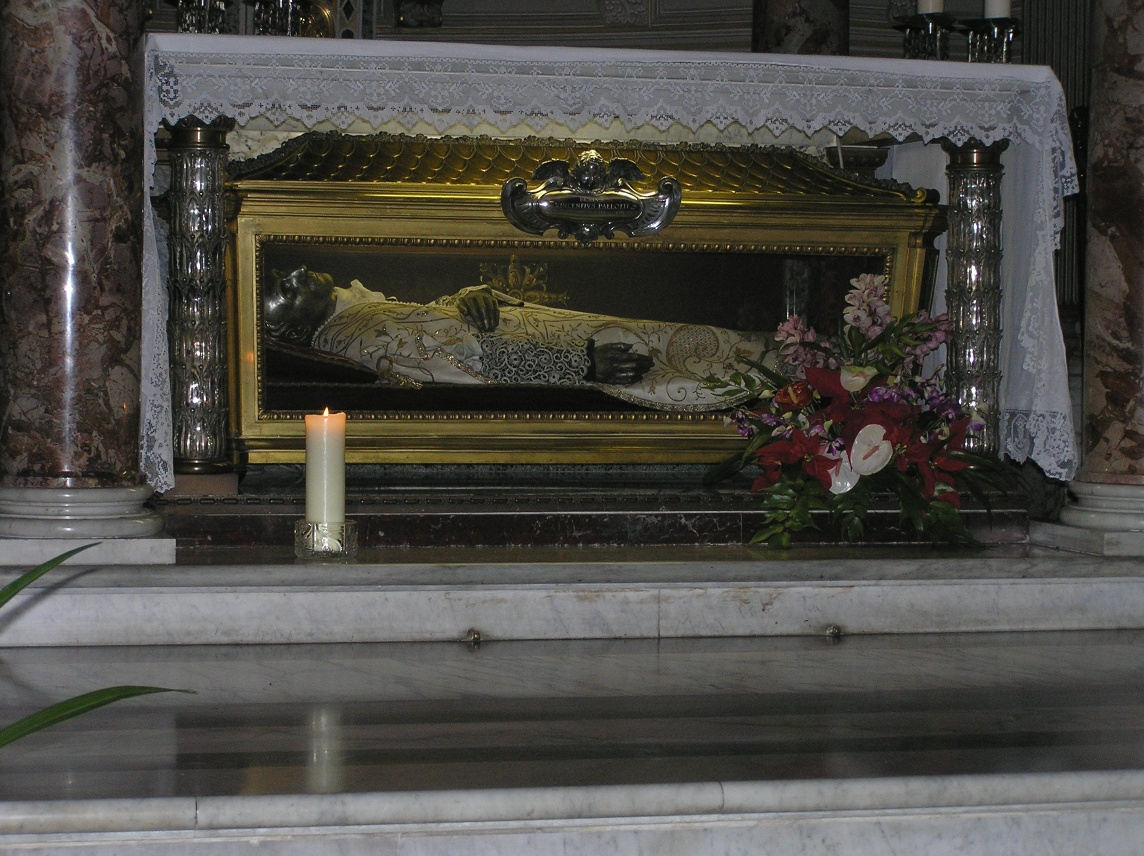
Sarcophagus of preserved body of Vincenzo Pallotti

== History ==
The Via dei Pettinari retraces the route of an ancient path which starts from the Pons Aurelius and headed towards the Theatre of Pompey. A church at the site was present by the 12th century, and is mentioned in a bull by Pope Honorius II in 1127. It was dedicated under the title "Transfiguration of our Lord Jesus Christ". The Transfiguration was depicted in the apse by Filippo Prosperi. Between the windows, in each of the eight quadrants divided by pilasters on the dark red wall, Prósperi also frescoed, on gold, saints and patriarchs of the Old Testament that foreshadowed the Savior. The suffix in onda derives from the frequent floods (inondazione) of the district by the Tiber river.

By 1260, a church was erected and placed under the ownership of a monastic order of Paul of Thebes, the first Christian hermit. In January 1445, the church and adjacent convent were then ceded to the Conventual Franciscans by Pope Eugene IV, and in 1844, Pope Gregory XVI ceded the church to a new order organized by Vincenzo Pallotti. The campanile has two bells of 1850 to replace the previous, seized by the Roman Republic in 1848. The church underwent reconstruction in 1867, including elevation, directed by Luca Carimini, who used a basilica design. The work was funded by the Cassetta brothers, Antonio and Pietro as the Pallottines could not then afford it. The church was reopened August 6, 1878, by a mass presided over by Msgr. Francesco di Paola Cassetta.

The church is divided by twelve pillars into three naves. In the center of the apse is a fresco depicting Virgin and Child (1878) by Cesare Mariani, which replaced the picture of the Queen of the Apostles by Serafino Cesaretti. Under the main altar is a sarcophagus made by Arnoldo Brandizzi which, since 1950, contains the body of St Vincent Pallotti.

The Lady Chapel of the Virgo Potens opens to the right nave. The chapel was erected in the last century by the Cassetta family. On the altar is the picture of the “Virgo Potens” donated by the Venerable Elisabetta Sanna, who died in 1857 and was buried in this chapel. The Stations of the Cross were made by Domenico Cassarotti. The organ is the work of Pietro Pantanella.

Below the presbytery of the church, there is a crypt, dating probably to the eighth century. Under the crypt, below the level of the city are wine cellars and storerooms of Roman times.

Pope John Paul II visited the church on June 22, 1986. He had stayed at the Generalate House for some weeks in 1946 while a student in Rome.

== Elisabetta Sanna ==
Elisabetta Sanna was born April 23, 1788, in Condrongianos, Sardinia to a family of farmers. At the age of three months she contracted smallpox, which left her with her slightly crippled. She was married in 1807 at the age of nineteen. She and her husband, Antonio, had seven children, two of whom died young. In 1825 Antonio died, leaving her a widow with five children between the ages of three and seventeen. In 1830 she made a pilgrimage to Rome, where she met Vincent Pallotti. She became a secular Franciscan tertiary and later, one of the first members of the Catholic Union of St. Vincent Pallotti. She died in Rome on February 17, 1857, and is buried in the church of SS. Salvatore in Onda. On January 27, 2014 Pope Francis declared Elisabetta Sanna venerable.
