= Osilo =

Osilo Ósile (Sardinian)
- Comune
- Comune di Osilo
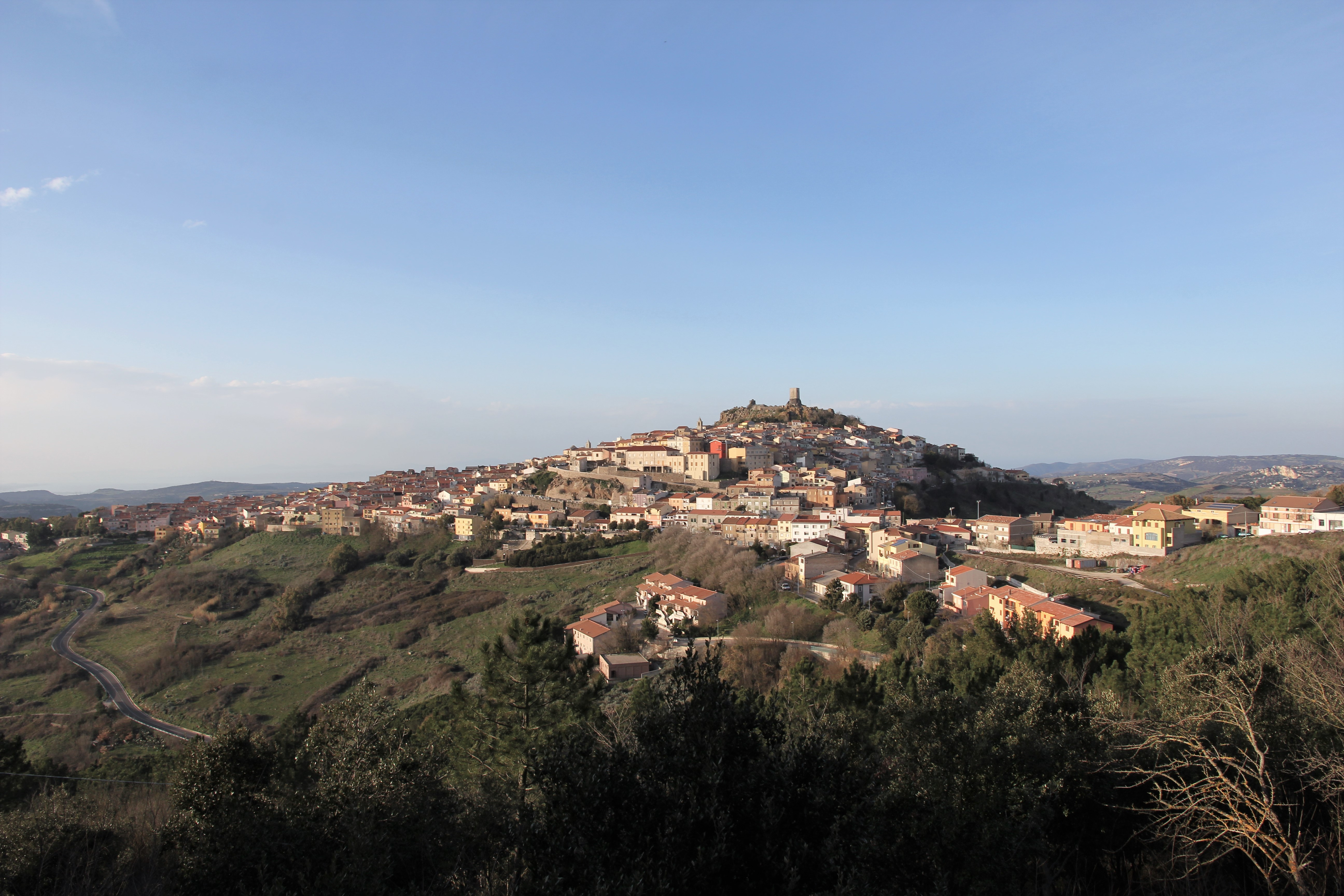
- View of Osilo

- Location within Sardinia
- Coordinates: 40°44′N 8°40′E
- Country: Italy
- Region: Sardinia
- Metropolitan city: Sassari (SS)
- Frazioni: Santa Vittoria, San Lorenzo

Government
  - Mayor: Giovanni Ligios

Area
  - Total: 98.03 km^{2} (37.85 sq mi)
- Elevation: 672 m (2,205 ft)

Population (2026)
  - Total: 2,732
  - Density: 27.87/km^{2} (72.18/sq mi)
- Demonym: Osilesi
- Time zone: UTC+1 (CET)
  - Summer (DST): UTC+2 (CEST)
- Postal code: 07033
- Dialing code: 079

Osilo (Sardinian: Ósile) is a town and comune (municipality) in the Metropolitan City of Sassari in the autonomous island region of Sardinia in Italy, located about 170 kilometres (110 mi) north of Cagliari and about 10 kilometres (6 mi) east of Sassari. It has 2,732 inhabitants. It is part of the Anglona traditional region.

The municipality of Osilo contains the frazioni (subdivisions, mainly villages and hamlets) Santa Vittoria and San Lorenzo.

Osilo borders the municipalities of Cargeghe, Codrongianos, Muros, Nulvi, Ploaghe, Sassari, Sennori, and Tergu.

== Demographics ==
As of 2026, the population is 2,732, of which 49.0% are males, and 51.0% are females. Minors make up 10.0% of the population, and seniors make up 30.3%.

Historical population

Year	Pop.	±%
1861	4,560	—
1871	4,829	+5.9%
1881	4,988	+3.3%
1901	5,223	+4.7%
1911	5,654	+8.3%
1921	5,206	−7.9%
1931	5,502	+5.7%
1936	5,684	+3.3%

Year	Pop.	±%
1951	5,727	+0.8%
1961	5,266	−8.0%
1971	4,402	−16.4%
1981	3,973	−9.7%
1991	3,847	−3.2%
2001	3,498	−9.1%
2011	3,204	−8.4%
2021	2,834	−11.5%

Source: ISTAT

=== Immigration ===
As of 2025, immigrants make up 2.7% of the population. The 5 largest foreign countries of birth are Romania, Germany, Tunisia, Argentina, and Ukraine.

== Sights ==
The sights include a castle and several churches.

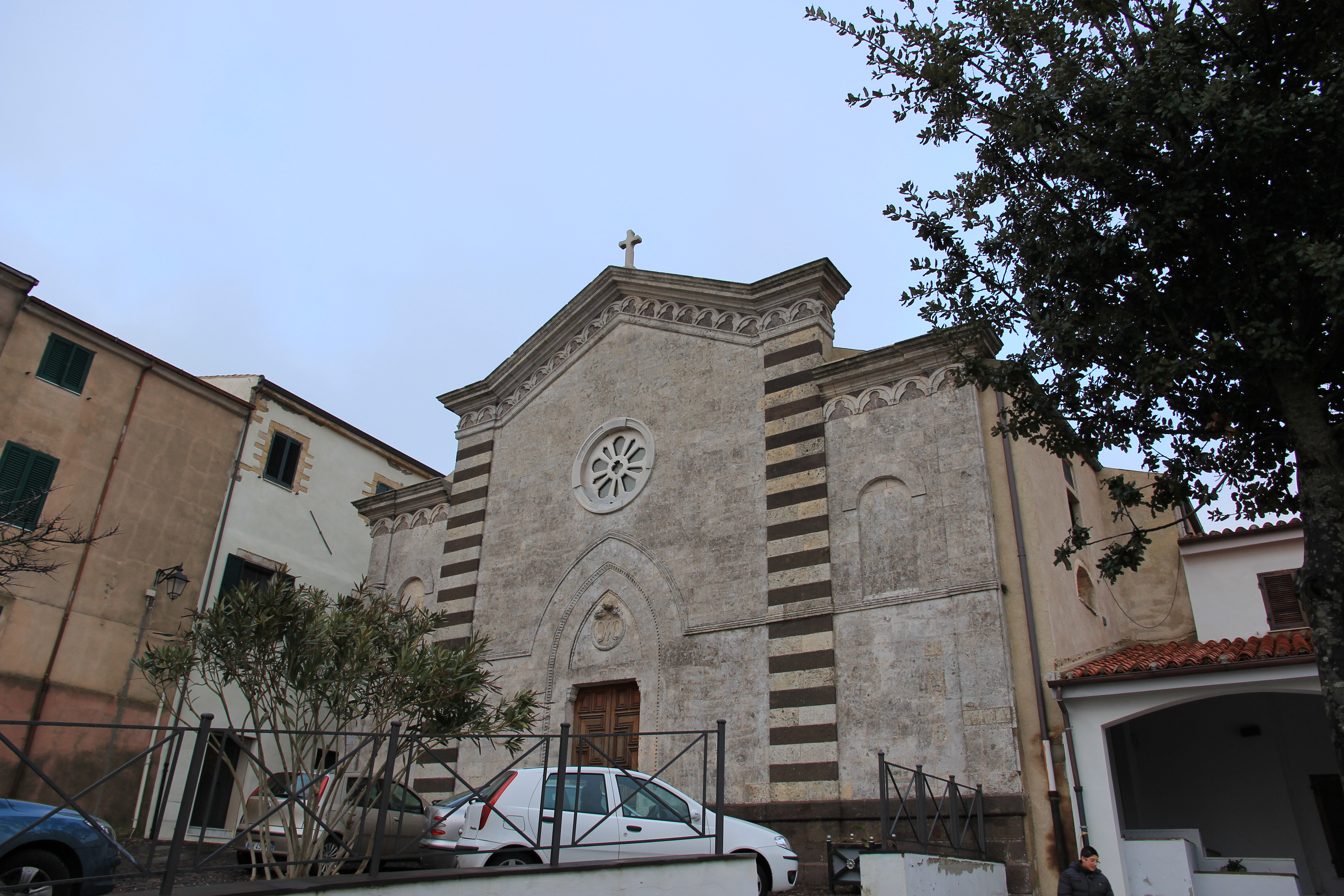
Church of Immacolata Concezione

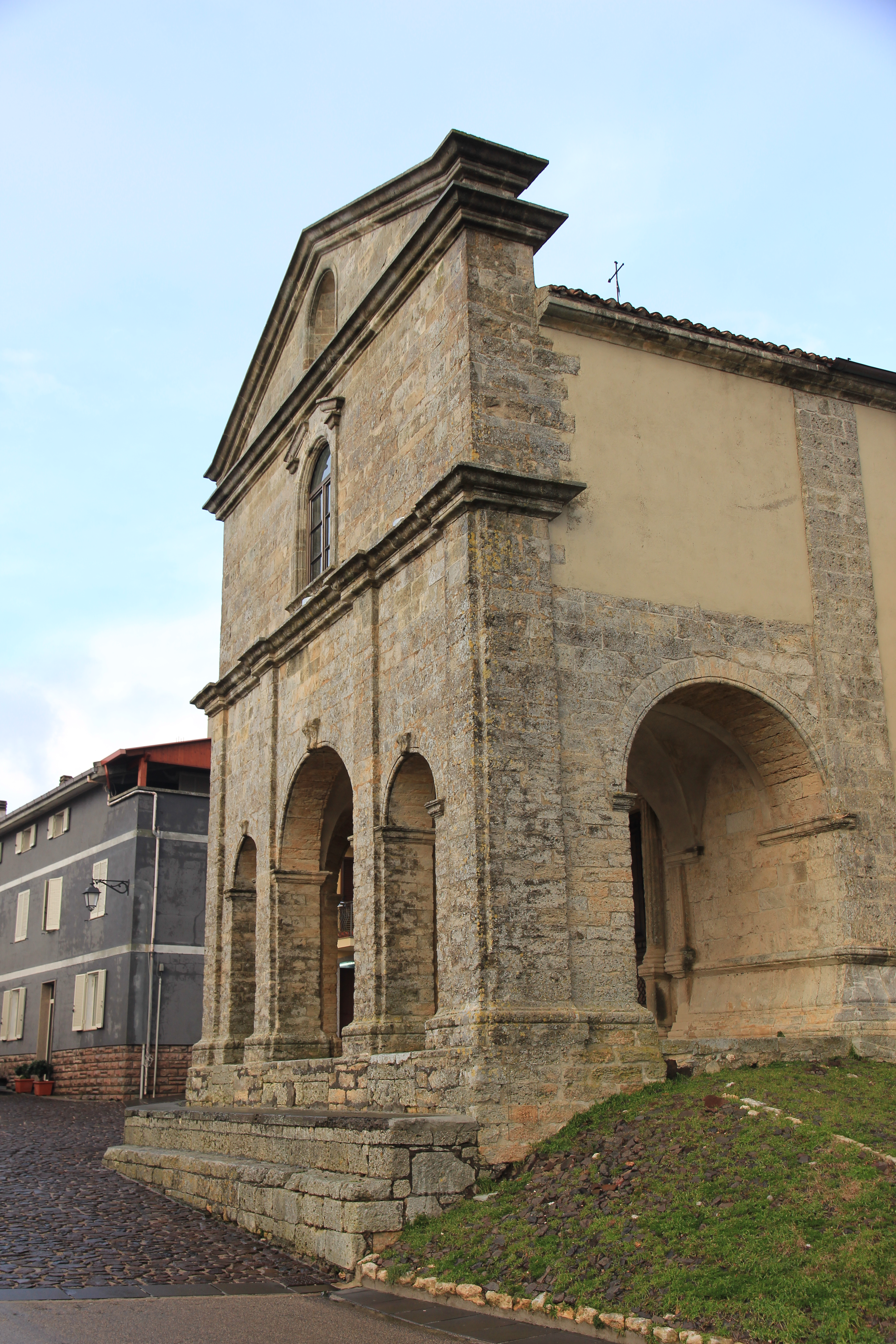
Church of Rosario

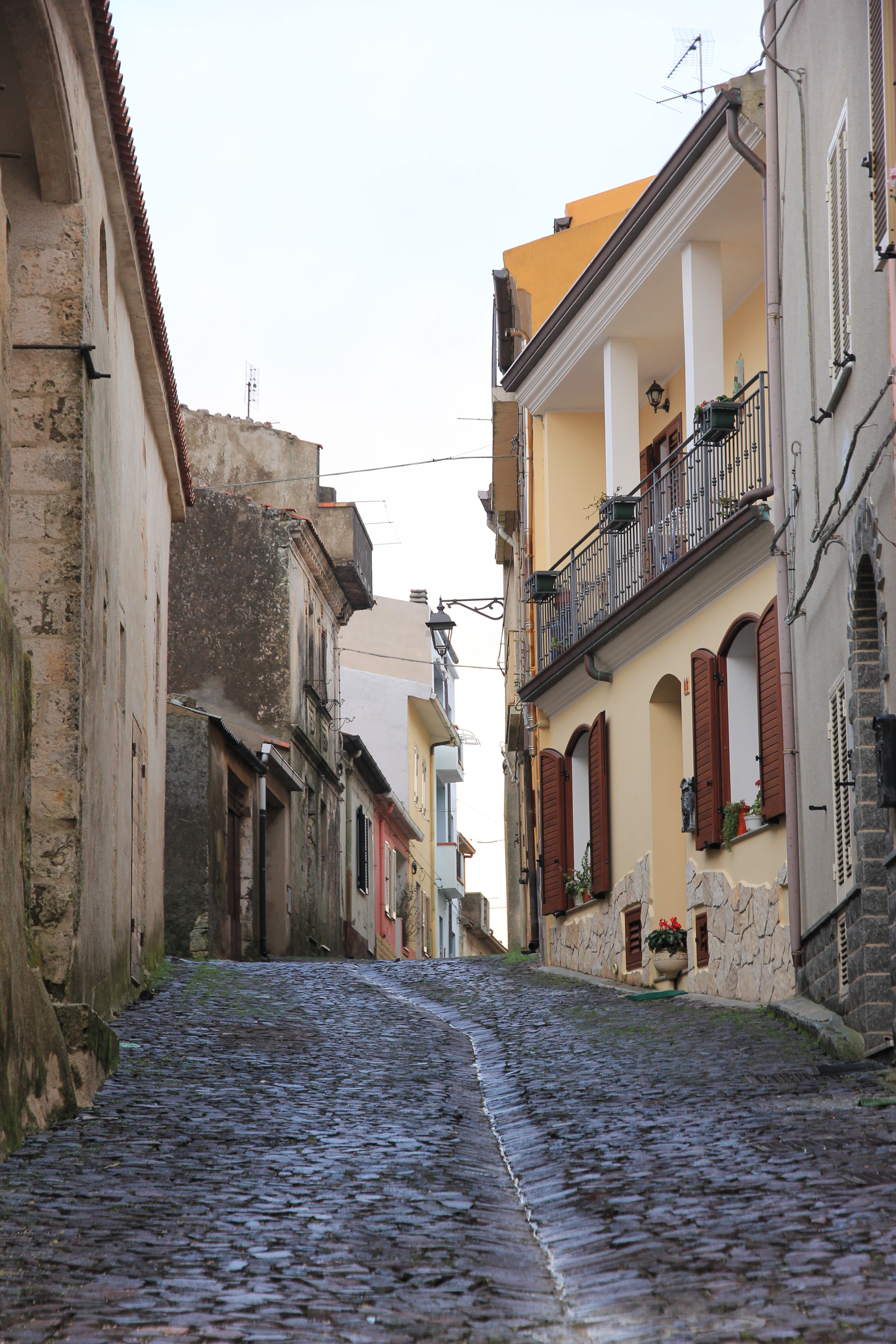
Historical Centre

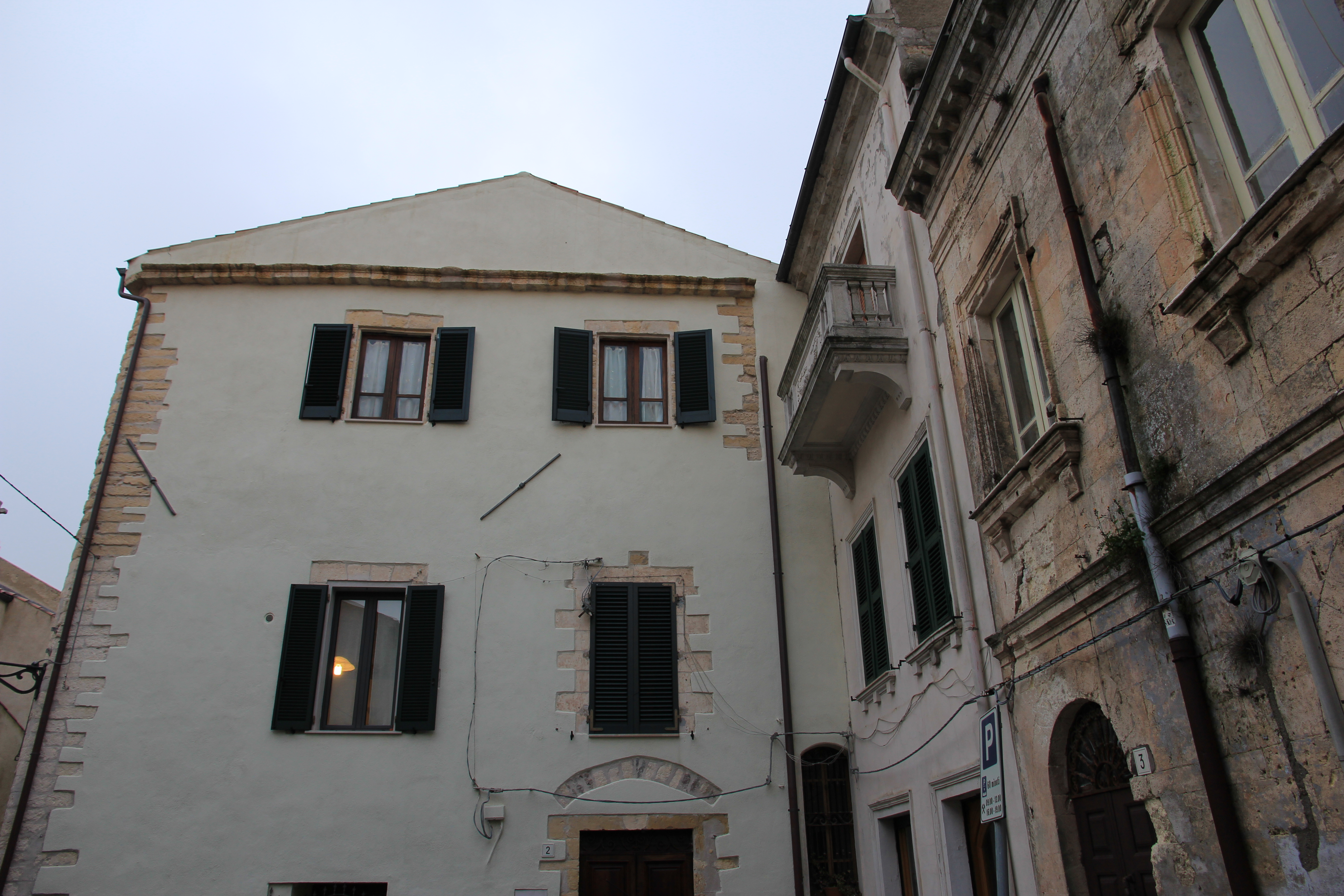
Historical Centre

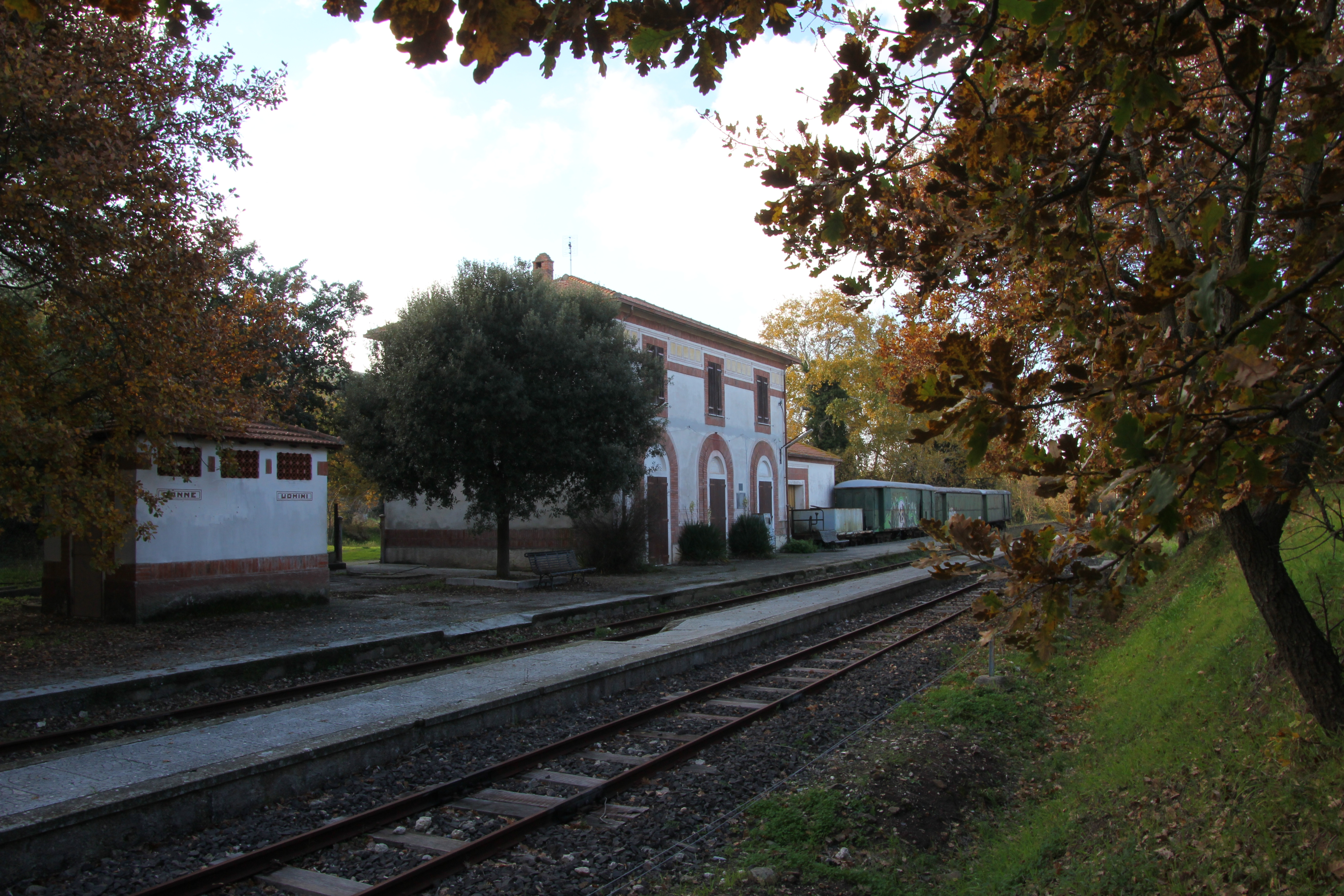
Railway Station

== Economy ==
The economy is mostly based on agriculture and animal husbandry, especially of sheep, which include about 250 dairy companies. It is the production center of the Osilo pecorino cheese.
