= Napoleone Parisani =

Italian painter

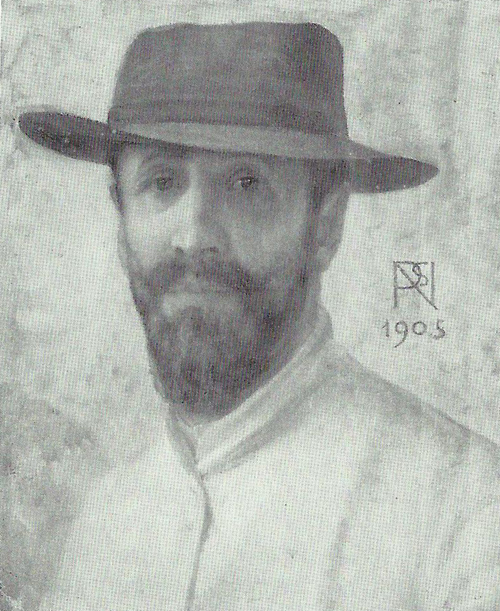
Self-portrait

Napoleone Parisani (11 April 1854 – 20 September 1932) was an Italian landscape and occasional portrait painter.

== Biography ==
He was born in Camerino to Count Giuseppe Parisani (1823–1887), the first mayor of Camerino after unification, and Princess Emilia Gabrielli di Prossedi (1830–1911). His grandmother was Charlotte Bonaparte Gabrielli, the eldest daughter of Lucien Bonaparte.

Following his parents' wishes, he studied agriculture and economics, graduating from the technical institute in Camerino in 1875, then moving to Milan to look after his family's holdings there. Despite his father's disapproval, he was determined to be an artist and, in 1881, moved to Rome where he obtained the support of his uncle, Prince Placido Gabrielli, who was married to Augusta Bonaparte (1836–1900). He then enrolled at the Accademia di Belle Arti di Roma and studied with Filippo Prosperi.

After graduating, he became an habitué of the Antico Caffè Greco, where he met Giovanni Costa and, through his influence, decided to become a landscape painter. In 1885, he made the acquaintance of Ernest Hébert, then serving as Director of the French Academy at the Villa Medici, who also had a major influence on him. Hébert allowed him to use his studio, and that is where Parisani met the model, Adelaide Lucaferri, who became his wife. Another one of his friends was George Howard, 9th Earl of Carlisle, a noted art collector and artist, who facilitated exhibitions for Parisani at the New Gallery in London.

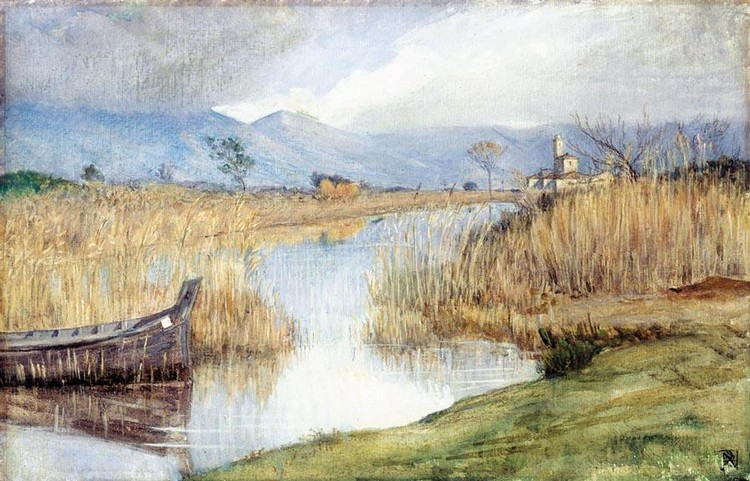
The Pontine Marshes

In 1895, he became interested in religious art, beginning with the creation of a Madonna at a religious asylum in his mother's hometown of Prossedi. He befriended Adolfo De Carolis there and they took "pilgrimages" together to study the Old Masters in Umbria, Marche and Tuscany. De Carolis also produced several religious mosaics based on drawings by Parisani.

During the 1900s through the 1920s, he participated several times in the exhibitions of the Venice Biennial and spent some time at Hébert's studio in Paris, where he presented works at the Salon of the Société Nationale des Beaux-Arts. He also returned to landscape painting, helped found a group known as the "XXV della campagna romana" and exhibited at the Rome Biennial. He died in 1932 in Rome. After his death, a major retrospective was held at the Doria Pamphilj Gallery.
