= Fausto Vagnetti =

Italian painter (1876–1954)

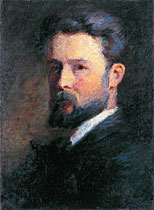
Youthful self-portrait

Fausto Vagnetti (March 24, 1876 – 1954) is a representative of Italian painting from the era of transition from the 19th to the 20th century. He emigrated from Tuscany to Rome and started infusing Tuscan brilliance and chromatism into the warm Roman style of painting.

== Biography ==
He was born in Anghiari, alta Val Tiberina, and he was to remain strictly tied to Anghiari for the rest of his life.

At the age of seventeen he emigrated to Rome where he became a pupil of painter Filippo Prosperi in Via Ripetta's Institute of Fine Arts.

From 1908 he taught Architectural Draftsmanship at the Engineering Department of the University of Rome. From 1912 he held the chair of "Figura disegnata" (Figure painting) at the Via Ripetta Institute. In the same year he was called to the chair of Perspective and Scenography of the Technical and Industrial Institute of Rome.

In 1922, in the year of its foundation, he held the chair of "Disegno dal vero" (Representation from life) in the Architecture Department of the University of Rome.

He died suddenly in his atelier on September 18, 1954.

== Paintings ==
An erudite researcher of the laws of sight and a master of drawing, F. Vagnetti painted principally oil and pastel pictures.

After an early period when he flanked the chromatic researches of Emile Claus and Georges Seurat, he experienced a personal pointillism in which the stroke's refinement and chromatic science join to an astonishing depictive capability.

Some of his principal works are monumental landscapes ("Tra le querce" 1915, "Tramonto al Palatino"1924), portraits of a deep psychological sharpness ("Giovanni Giolitti" 1928, only existing portrait of this statesman; "Anima mite" 1923; "L’ingegnere Dino Chiaraviglio" 1938, "La mia Mamma cieca" 1938), large compositions of familiar or social characters ("Moti proletari" 1904, "Dolore antico" 1921, "Sosta dolorosa" 1948).

In 1922 he painted three monumental portraits of the Italian Sovereigns for the Governmental Palace of Zara; in 1923 he carried out a "Trittico francescano" in the Church of S. Polo near La Verna (in Tuscany).

In 1943, on Vatican commission, he painted a portrait of Pope Pius XII in the Church of SS. Pietro e Paolo in EUR at Rome and, in 1944, for the Board Office of the Italian Socialist Party, he painted the portraits of Bruno Buozzi, Giacomo Matteotti and Filippo Turati.

== Exhibitions ==
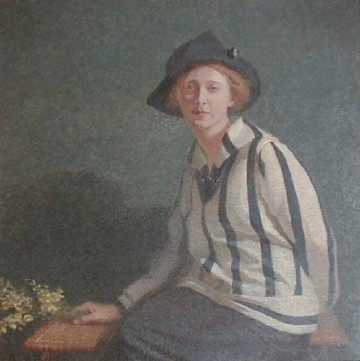
Portrait of Rosalia

From 1907 to 1930 Fausto Vagnetti was present in Italian artistic life taking part in twenty collective exhibitions.

In the following fifteen years, because of his manifest aversion to Fascism, he was kept off the stage of pictorial art only to reappear in the Rome "Quadriennali" of 1945 and 1948.

In 2004 two anthological exhibitions were opened in Anghiari, his native town, and in Rome, accommodated by the Ministero dei Beni ambientali e culturali (Ministry of Culture) in the San Michele a Ripa's Institute.

== Writings ==
In 1928 he won the "Concorso Nazionale Poletti" (National Poletti Contest) publicized by San Luca Academy for an essay about the causes of the decline of the art of painting ("Qual siano le cause che possano apportare decadimento all’Arte della Pittura – 1933, Edizioni Castaldi).

On commission for the Ministry of Education in 1943 he wrote "La regia Accademia di Belle Arti di Roma" (The Royal Academy of Arts) edited by Le Monnier, Florence. In the same year he published "Il disegno nelle scuole d’Italia" Metodo per gli Istituti magistrali" (Draftsmanship in Italian schools, a method for teacher's colleges).

Main following works are the "Trattato di Prospettiva lineare e Teoria delle ombre" (1945–48, edizioni Mediterranee) and, in 1950 the "Trattato di Proiezioni ortogonali" (Edizioni Mediterranee, Roma).

He left a diary made by several notebooks about painting and autobiographical events, which is stored and accessible at the Archivio diaristico nazionale in Pieve Santo Stefano, where it has been finalist in the competition 2016 of the Premio Pieve Saverio Tutino.
