= Vincent Pallotti =

Italian Roman Catholic saint

Saint Vincent Pallotti SAC
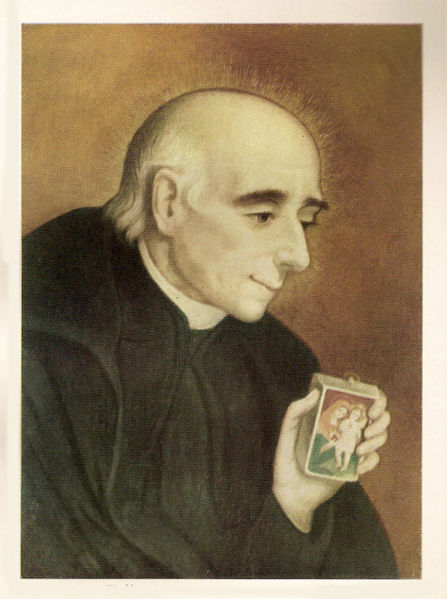

Priest
- Born: 21 April 1795; Rome, Papal States
- Died: 22 January 1850 (aged 54); Rome, Papal States
- Venerated in: Roman Catholic Church
- Beatified: 22 January 1950, Saint Peter's Basilica, Vatican City by Pope Pius XII
- Canonized: 20 January 1963, Saint Peter's Basilica, Vatican City by Pope John XXIII
- Feast: 22 January
- Attributes: Priest's cassock
- Patronage: Pallottines

Vincent Pallotti, SAC (21 April 1795 – 22 January 1850) was an Italian Catholic cleric and the founder of the Society of the Catholic Apostolate, later known as the Pious Society of Missions (the Pallottines). The original name was restored in 1947. He is buried in the Church of San Salvatore in Onda. He is considered the forerunner of Catholic Action. His feast day is 22 January.

== Biography ==
Vincent Pallotti was born in Rome on 21 April 1795, to Pietro and Magdalena De Rossi Pallotti. He was descended from the noble families of the Pallotti of Norcia and the De Rossi of Rome. He was the uncle of Cardinal Luigi Pallotti (1829–1890).

His early studies were made at the Pious Schools of San Pantaleone, and from there he passed to the Roman College. At the age of sixteen, he resolved to become a priest, and was ordained on 16 May 1818. Shortly thereafter he earned a doctorate in theology. Pallotti is described as small of stature, slight of build, with big blue eyes and penetrating glance.

He was given an assistant professorship at the Sapienza University but resigned it soon after to devote himself to pastoral work. Pallotti worked selflessly looking after the poor in the urban areas of the city for most of his life. He organized schools for shoemakers, tailors, coachmen, carpenters, and gardeners so that they could better work at their trade, as well as evening classes for young farmers and unskilled workers. He soon became known as a "second Saint Philip Neri". He once dressed up as an old woman to hear the confession of a man who threatened "to kill the first priest who came through the door".

== Union of the Catholic Apostolate (UAC) ==
On 9 January 1835, Pallotti found the Union of the Catholic Apostolate. He expressed his idea in the following words: "The Catholic Apostolate, that is, the universal apostolate, which is common to all classes of people, consists in doing all that one must and can do for the great glory of God and for one’s own salvation and that of one’s neighbor." On 11 July 1835, Pope Gregory XVI gave his approval.

The Society was placed under the protection of Mary, Queen of Apostles. During the cholera plague in 1837, Pallotti ministered to the stricken. In 1838 the Society was ordered dissolved, as it was seen as a duplication of the Society for the Propagation of the Faith. Pallotti appealed this decision to the pope and the order of dissolution was withdrawn.

On 28 October 2003, the Union of Catholic Apostolate was declared an International Public Association of the Faithful by a decree of the Pontifical Council for the Laity.

== Society of the Catholic Apostolate (SAC) ==
In 1835 Pallotti formed the priests and brothers of the Union he called together into a community he called the "Society of the Catholic Apostolate". However, as soon as Pallotti died in 1850 there was more trouble and presumably the original decree of dissolution was unearthed. When Pallotti's last defender Cardinal Lambruscini died in 1854, the name of the Society was abruptly changed to "The Pious Society of Missions". This lasted until 1947 when "by a gracious act of the Holy See" the original name of the society was restored.

He had an intense devotion to the mystery of the Most Blessed Trinity, and to the Virgin Mary. His contemporaries, including the pope, considered him a saint during his life.

Vincent Pallotti died in Rome, on 22 January 1850.

== Veneration ==
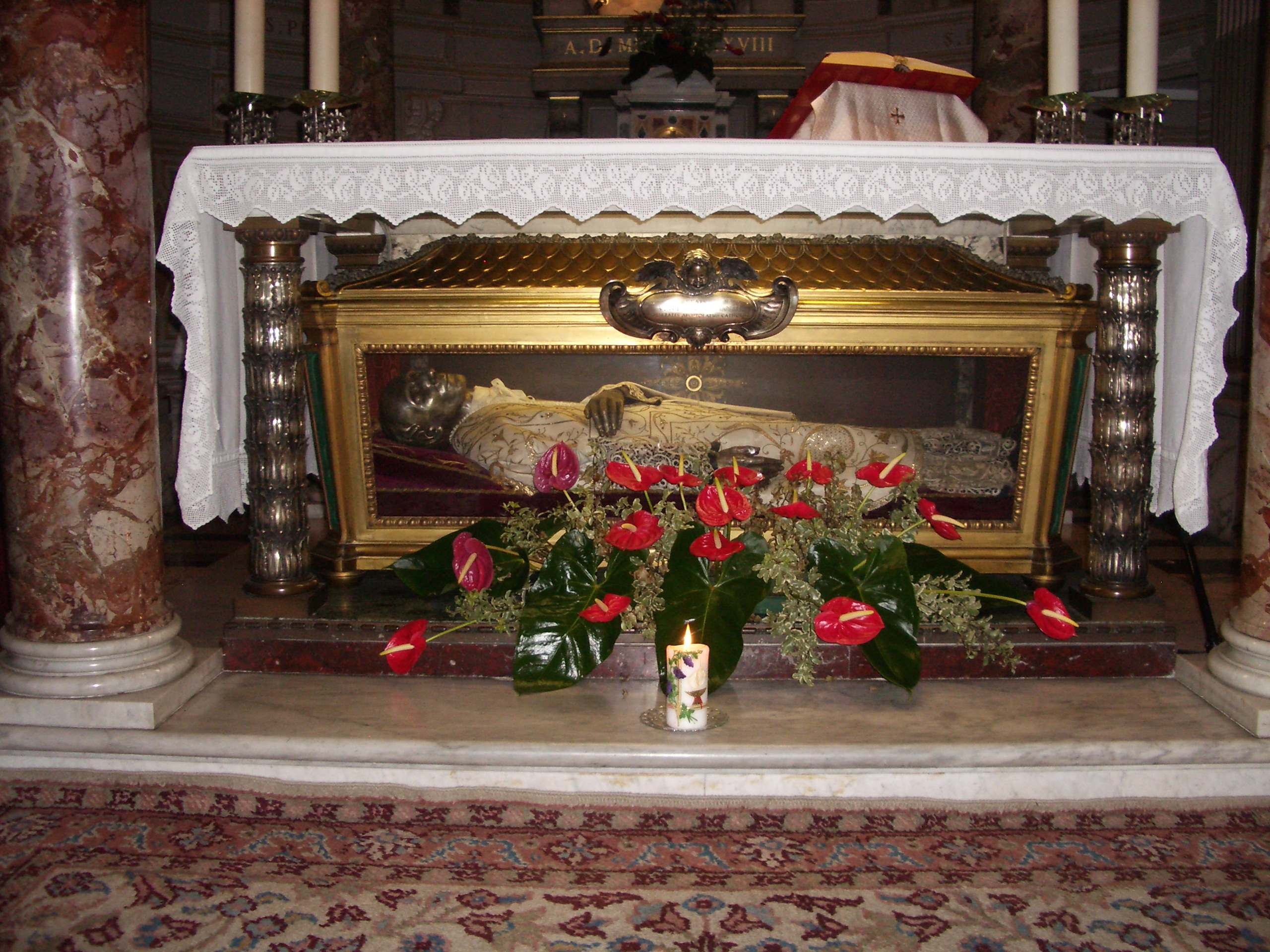
Tomb in the San Salvatore in Onda church in Rome.

He was beatified by Pope Pius XII on 22 January 1950. He was canonized in 1963 by Pope John XXIII. On 6 April 1963, he was named principal patron of the Pontifical Missionary Union of Clergy.

When Pallotti's body was exhumed in 1906 and 1950, examiners found his body to be incorrupt, a sign of holiness in the tradition of the Roman Catholic Church. His body is enshrined in the church of San Salvatore in Onda, in Rome, where it can be seen.

== Legacy ==
Pallotti was deemed a patron of Vatican II for his efforts toward building unity in the church through such practices as inviting the people of his community to worship in the Roman parishes of Eastern Catholic Churches.

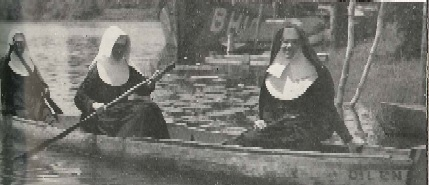
Pallottine sisters in Belize, where they have ministered to the Maya peoples since the 1930s

His followers are the Pallottines, still operating internationally. They follow his motto, "The love of Christ impels us" (Caritas Christi Urget Nos). Members of the Society of the Catholic Apostolate work as everyday missionaries to "renew faith and rekindle love." They work to fulfill the mission of their founder in the modern world. The Pallottines have major houses in Britain, Germany, New York, Poland, India, Ireland. Belize, and several other locations.

The Congregation of the Sisters of the Catholic Apostolate, commonly referred to as Pallottines, is an international community founded in Rome, Italy by Vincent Pallotti. The Pallottine Sisters trace their beginnings to the Pia Casa di Carità (Pious House of Charity) he established in Rome in 1838. This was a work dedicated to the religious and civil education of young girls who had been abandoned on the streets of Rome to procure food through begging. It is a work that is still operating today.

The Missionary Sisters of the Catholic Apostolate began in Germany as a response to the missionary needs in the Cameroons which were being administrated by the Pallottine Fathers.

During the Christmas Season, a nativity scene that Pallotti made himself is put on display at the Vatican, in the basilica's square, before the Christmas tree. Pallotti promoted the celebration of the Octave of the Epiphany as an act of unity with his Orthodox brethren who celebrated Christmas on 6 January at that time.

== See also ==
- Pallottines
- St Peter's Italian Church
- St. Vincent Pallotti High School
