= Path of 100 Towers (Sardinia) =

Trekking route along the coastline of Sardinia in Italy

Cammino 100 Torri (Way 100 Towers) (Sardinia)
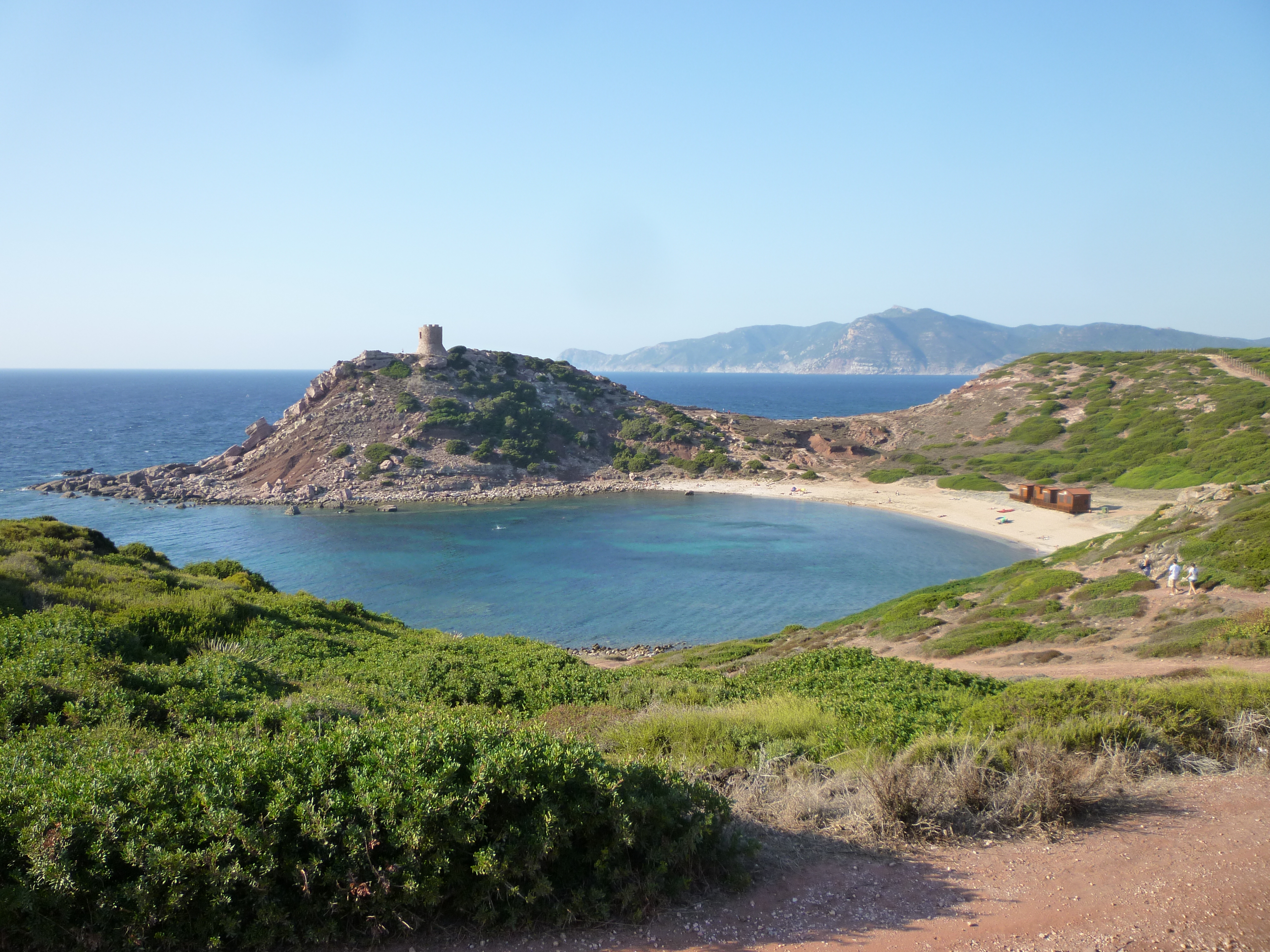
- Length: 1284 kilometers (798 miles)
- Location: Sardinia
- Use: Hiking, Cycling, Riding & Camping
- Highest point: 800 meters
- Difficulty: Medium
- Season: Spring - Autumn
- Months: May, June, September, October
- Hazards: Cliffs
- Surface: Mainly natural
- Right of way: Pedestrian
- Website: https://www.cammino100torri.com/

Trekking Route
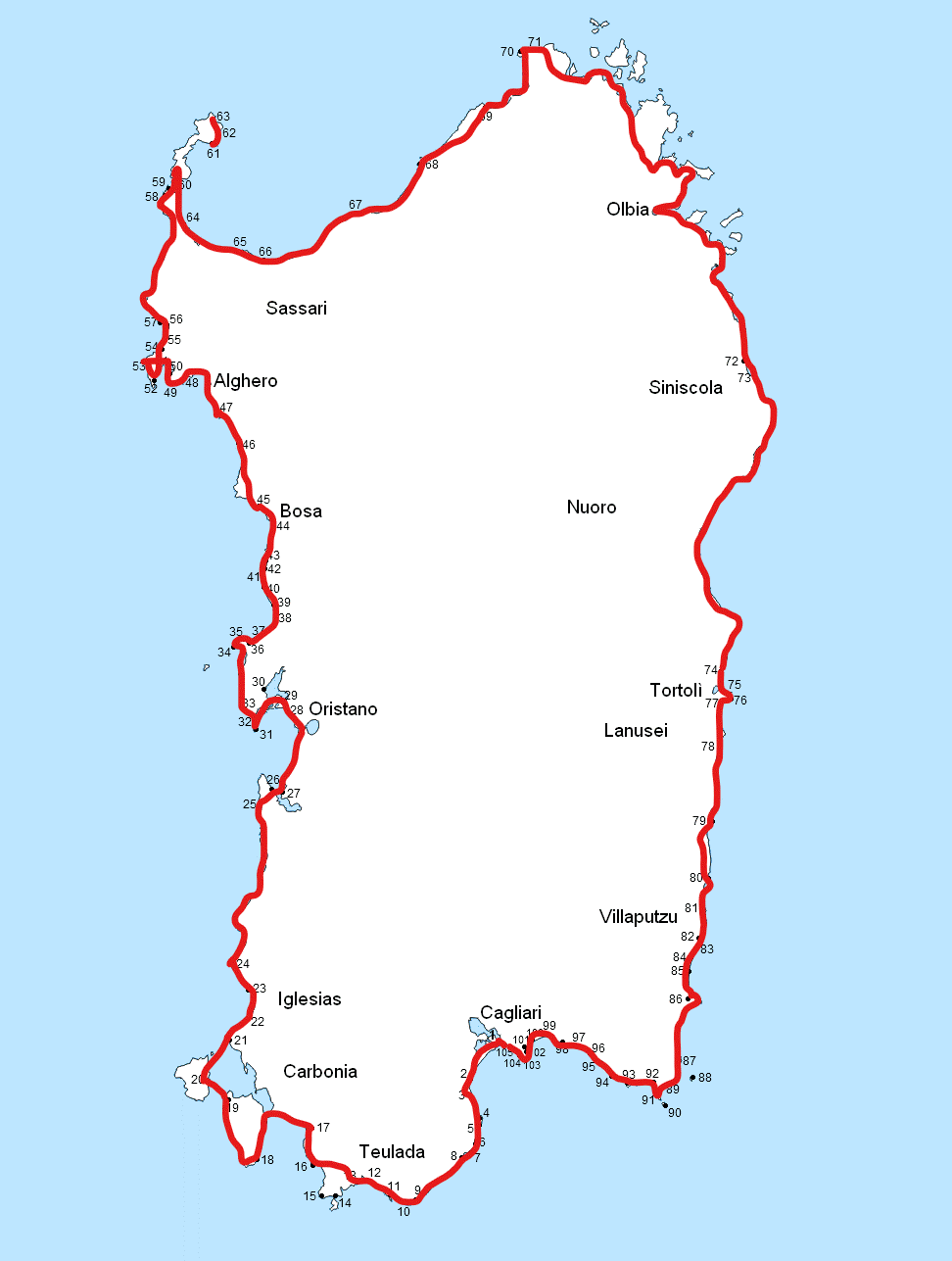

The Cammino 100 Torri (Way 100 Towers) is a multi-day trekking route that begins and ends in Cagliari (Sardinia). The path is named after the 105 historical coastal towers along the route.

The path extends throughout the island of Sardinia for 1284 kilometers (798 miles) making it the longest trek in Italy. The trek can be divided into two paths: the eastern path and the western path. Beaches and Mediterranean scrub, from Cagliari to Gallura characterize the eastern section. The western section traverses ponds, lagoons, and coastal dunes from Castelsardo to Cagliari.

The path runs counterclockwise and consists of eight named stages: Street of Angels; Street of Sarcapos; Street Ogliastra; Street Gallura; Street Catalana; Street of the Giants, Streets of the Mines and Street of Martyrdom. The estimated time to complete the entire trek varies from 45 to 60 days, depending on the experience and fitness of the walker. The path can also be broken down into shorter itineraries and completed in fewer days.

It has been recognized by the Register of Paths of Sardinia and Religious and Spiritual Itineraries (Registro Dei Cammini di Sardegna e Degli Itinerari Religiosi e Dello Spirito) as representing the Sardinian identity, spirit and culture.

The path follows the coastline at an average distance of two kilometers from the shore, crossing beaches, towns, and cities, with extensive views of the Sarninian coastline and hills.

This itinerary is used for various outdoor activities, including trekking, hiking, camping, and bike riding.

== History ==
The Path of 100 Towers was created in 2017 and implemented by three Sardinians: Nicola Melis, Roberto Contu, and Stefano Paderi. Nicola Melis drew his inspiration after having walked the Camino de Santiago in Spain with his father in 2013. His idea was to create a similar trek in Sardinia, his country of origin, to increase awareness and encourage the exploration of the island's landscape.

The origins of the route go back to at least the medieval period. From 1600 AD the king of Sardinia, Philiph II sent captain Marco Antonio Camos from Iglesias, to circumnavigate the island on horseback to take a census of the cities and towns of the region. The purpose was to develop the defensive system of the island by building new towers to be placed under the control of the office of the Administraciόn del Real. In his report, the captain indicated the points from which to draw the materials for the construction of the towers, the number of soldiers for each, and who should bear the costs for their supply.

The route is dotted with towers and religious buildings which are related to the military and religious history of the Sardinians. There are over 100 towers and about 500 religious sites including sanctuaries and churches.

== Trekking routes ==
The Path of 100 Towers consists of eight sections or "Streets" which can be challenging due to elevation changes in the routes and Sardinia's Mediterranean climate.

Route Summary
Name of the sections	From	To	Overall length	Starting point	Arrival point	Estimated days	Difficulty	Number of towers
Street of Angels	Cagliari	Villasimius	62,4 km	Tower of Sa Scafa	Villasimius	3	2/5	14
Street Sarcapos	Villasimius	Arbatax	143,1 km	Villasimius	Tertenia	5-7	3/5	16
Street Ogliastra	Arbatax	Budoni	144,9 km	Tertenia	Budoni	about 7	4/5	6
Street Gallura	Budoni	Castelsardo	240,4 km	Porto San Paolo	Castelsardo	about 14	3/5	5
Street Catalana	Castelsardo	Bosa	238,1 km	Castelsardo	Bosa	about 14	3/5	24
Street of the Giants	Bosa Marina	Tower of Flumentorgiu- Torre dei Corsari	138,9 km	Antica Cornus	Neapolis	5-6	2/5	15
Street of the Mines	Tower of Flumentorgiu- Torre dei Corsari	Porto Scuso	94,2 km	Tower of Flumentorgiu- Torre dei Corsari	Porto Scuso	4-5	3/5	15
Street of Martyrdom	Porto Scuso	Cagliari	205,7 km	San Pietro Island- Isola di San Pietro	Nora	about 10	2/5	15

Street of Angels

Street of Angels

Street of Sarcapos

Street of Angels represents the first part of the path and has a total length of 62.4 kilometers. This section starts at the "Tower of Quarta Regia" (also known as "Tower of Sa Scafa") and ends in Villasimius. The street takes its name from the Gulf of Angels, where a legend says that at the time of Creation some angels asked God for a portion of land as a gift. In response, God gave them a place, called "The Gulf of Cagliari", where men lived happily with lovd and respect. The path passes through the city port of the Su Siccu's fishermen and continues along the city beach of Poetto, which extends for about eight kilometers to the "Margine Rosso" area, in the municipality of Quartù Saint Elena. It is one of the shortest stages of the trek and includes route finding challenges at crossroads and crossways.

Street Sarcapos

Street Ogliastra

Street Sarcapos is the second stage of the path, which extends for 143 kilometers along the coast of Sarrabus, including the municipalities of Castiadas, Muravera, San Vito, Villaputzu, and Villasimius. This section of the walk includes the "Quirra jump", a historical region of Sardinia, including mountain peaks such as the Massif of the "Sette Fratelli" (1,023m), and that of Cardiga (676m). These high regions extend to the coast and are characterized by steep slopes, beaches, and small alluvial plains. The main characteristic of this section is the presence of the "Flumendosa", the principal river of Sarrabus. This river is noted for its crystal clear water and is surrounded by dense vegetation in which the scents of strawberry tree, holm oaks, myrtle, mastic, and oaks mix.

Street Ogliastra

Street Gallura

The Street Ogliastra is the third section of the 100 Towers Walk and is one of the most arduous of the eight stages. The route crosses several popular coves, such as Cala Goloritzé, Cala Sisine, Cala Luna, and Cala Gonone, characterized by cliffs, caves, and indigenous vegetation. This section also traverses pine forests, mammoth arches, ancient holm oak woods, and old sheepfolds. This section starts at Tertenia, passing through "Sa Pedra Istampada" and the port of Arbatax, from which it climbs gradually towards "Golgo", located in the municipality of Baunei. With a total length of 144 kilometers, this route is considered one of the harder sections due to the lack of water, since water sources are rare, and the few refreshment points along the route are operational only for a few months during the year. It is also noted for the lack of asphalt, limited accommodation facilities, and its visual appeal.

Street Catalana

Street Gallura

Street Gallura is the fourth section of the walk, which is characterized by an articulated and jagged path that winds around narrow coastal inlets and granite rocks. It extends from the river Coghinas that delimits it to the west, to the massif of Mount Nieddu to the southeast, in the municipalities of San Teodoro and Budoni. The coast of this stage has numerous islands, including Tavolara and those of the Maddalena archipelago, which make Gallura one of the most famous tourist destinations in Sardinia. The main problems of this stage are the difficulty in finding beaches indicated by the itinerary and the high presence of private land.

Street of the Giants

Street Catalana

The Street Catalan is the fifth stage of the Path of 100 Towers. It is 238 kilometers long and is one of the longest sections. The route is characterized by wide beaches and villages of medieval origin of historical and artistic importance such as Castelsardo, Alghero, and Bosa. This section starts from "Castelsardo", a village overlooking the Gulf of Asinara. The path winds through a succession of rocky coastline with small coves, except for the beach of Lu Bagnu. The duration of this walk is about two weeks and it includes the challenge of reaching the island of Asinara.

Street of the Mines

Street of the Giants

The Street of the Giants is the sixth stage and consists of a path along the coast that goes from the site of ancient Cornus, an old city-state of Sardinia, founded in the last quarter of the 6th century BC, passing through Tharros, an archeological site of Phoenician origin in the province of Oristano, located in the municipality of Cabras. It finishes in "Neapolis", or New City, an ancient city and one of the most important places on the island.

Street of the Mines

Street of Martyrdom

The Street of the Mines is the seventh stage of the Path of 100 Towers and crosses the southwest coast of Sardinia. It traverses the first Geomining Park recognized as a UNESCO World Heritage Site. The name of the street derives from the history of the miners and the workers who lived in Buggerru. It was also called "Petit Paris" or "little Paris", as the wealthy mining managers who had moved to the mining village with their families had recreated a certain cultural environment. By contrast, the miners worked in poor conditions. They were poorly paid and were forced to work long shifts and were often victims of fatal accidents at work. They were organized by the Federation of Miners.

Street of Martyrdom

The Street of Martyrdom is the eighth and final section of the Path of 100 Towers. It is characterized by its religious associations and it takes its name from the physical union of the sites of the martyrdom of Saint Antioco and Saint Efisio. From the island of San Pietro "Carloforte", the path crosses the island of "Saint Antioco" through "Calasetta" and "Saint Antioco" until it arrives at "Porto Pino". The walk ends in Cagliari, passing through Chia, Pula, and Nora, concluding the Path of 100 Towers after 70 stages and 1284 kilometers.

== Towers ==
The towers were built along the route between the 1500s and 1700s and strategically situated on the coastline to prevent enemy invasions and incursions by pirates. The distribution of the towers in this way allowed them to communicate with each other using fire, smoke, and bells or by sending warnings with horse messengers. Most towers usually had a circular section at the bottom because of limited financial resources and a lack of building skills. Some of them are now in ruins, while others have been converted into lighthouses or acquired and transformed into private properties.

Types of towers

- Torre De Armas - Gagliarde: this type of tower has a height of 14 meters and a diameter of 17 meters. The towers were governed by a captain and armed with large calibre cannons, rifles, and mortars.
- Senzillas: this type of tower stands 13 meters tall and has a diameter of 10 meters. They were controlled by a commander and a few soldiers, equipped with two cannons and other smaller weaponry.
- Torrezillas: these towers were 5 meters in height and with a diameter of 7 meters. They were located in inaccessible locations with aspects designed to observe approaching enemies.
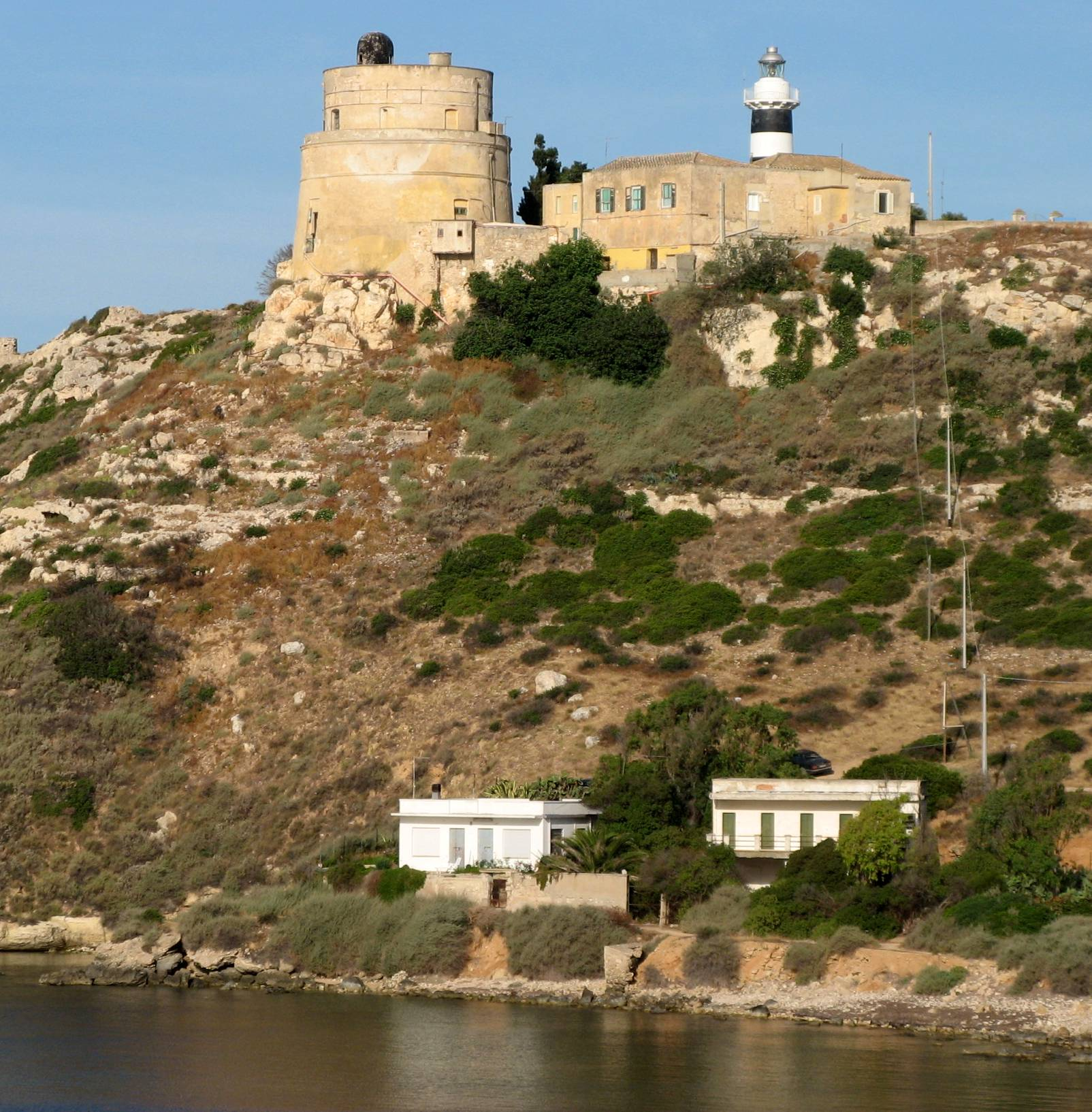
Tower of Calamosca, Torre de Armas - Gagliarde

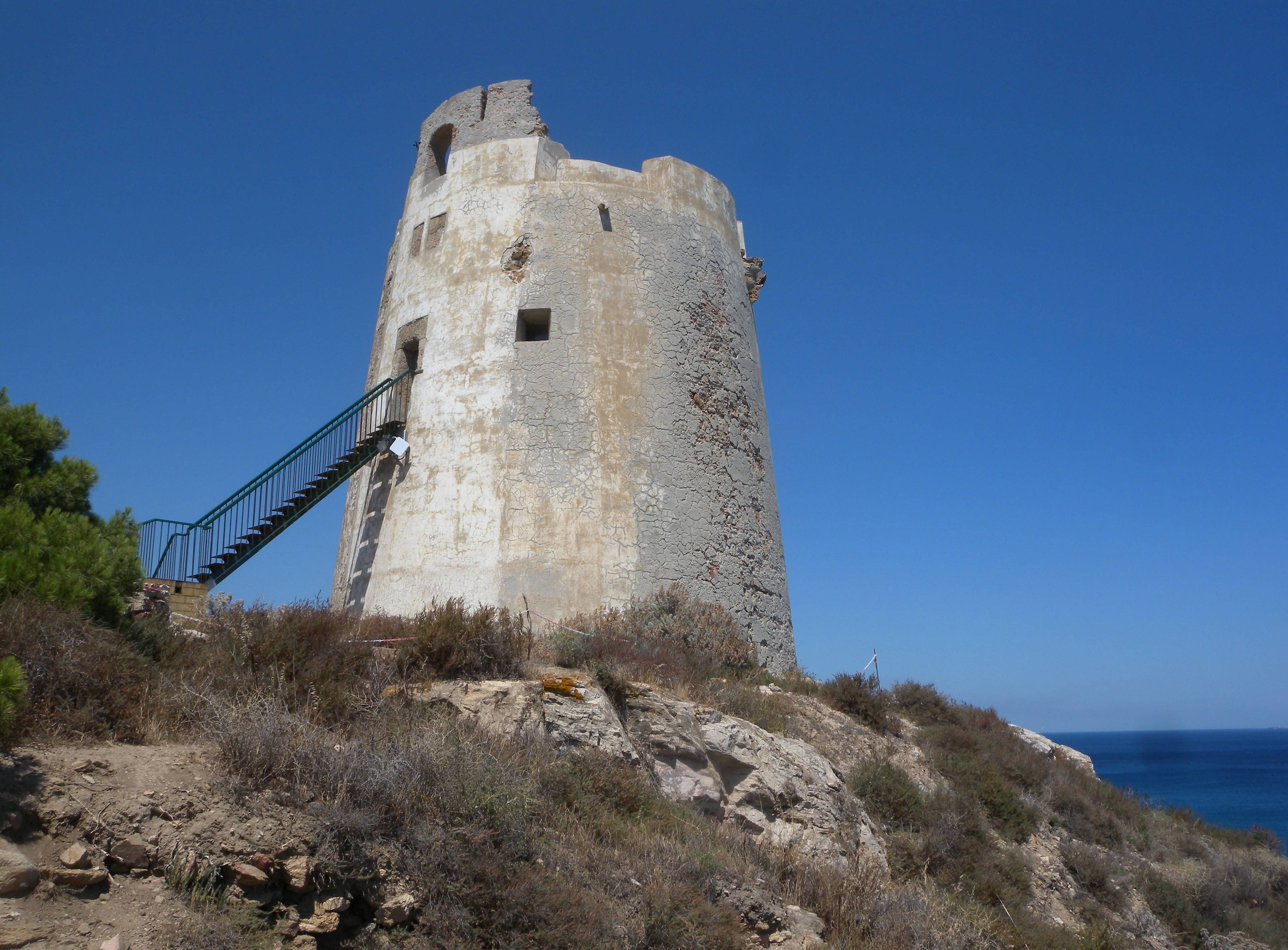
Tower of Chia, Senzillas

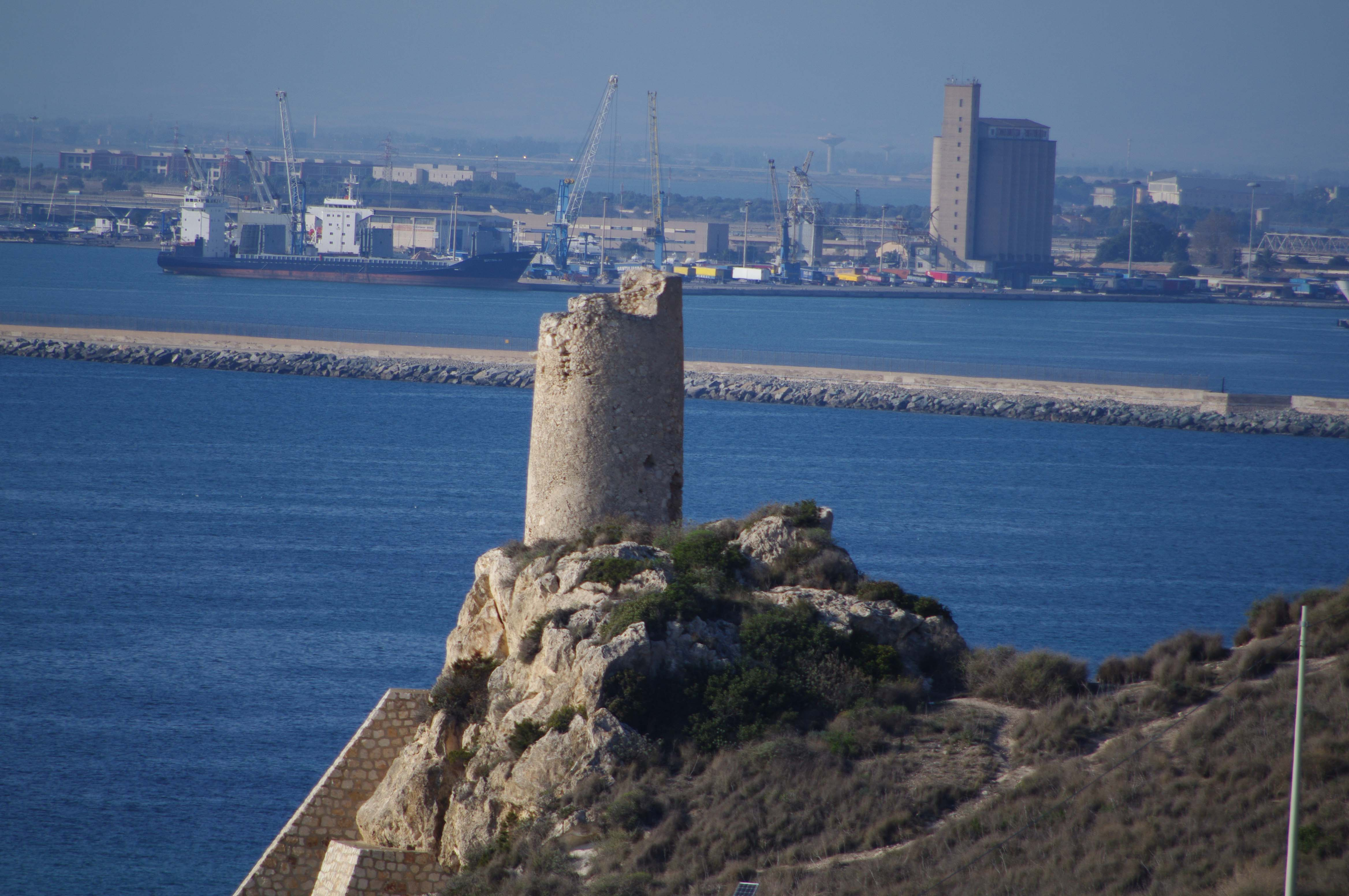
Tower of Lazzaretto, Torrezillas

=== Main towers ===
- Tower of Sa Scafa - Tower Della Quarta Reggia: this tower is located in Cagliari in the locality of "Sa Scafa". It is situated in a strategic position guarding the pond of "Santa Gallia" and the Gulf of Cagliari. It was built under the Aragonese to defend the island from Barbarian incursions. From Spanish times until 1954 fishermen of the pond were required to pay a fee the equivalent of one-fourth of the catch to the royal coffers. The name of the tower derives from this monetary fee. The payment of the fourth part of the catch was also known as arrendu, from the Spanish word "surrender". This practice remained in force until 1956 when it was abolished by regional law.
- Tower of Porto Giunco: it is an Aragonese watchtower, with an average size and a height of 10 meters, located on the East side of the Capo Carbonara promontory in Villasimius and it can be reached on foot from the cove of Porto Giunco or by car from Capo Carbonara. It faces the beach of Porto Giunco and from this tower is it possible to see the Tower of Isola dei Cavoli and the Tower of Saint Luigi.
- Tower of Saint Elia: this semi-ruined tower was built in 1282 on Saint Elia hill, and represents the first and oldest coastal watchtower in Sardinia. This tower has a military defense function and was also used to guide boats for the safest route to the port. After an attempted landing by the French the tower was abandoned in the late 18th century.
- Tower of Calamosca - Torre Dei Segnali: it is located in the municipality of Cagliari, on the hill of Saint Elia, near the beach of Calamosca and it was built by the Spaniards to fortify Cagliari. It was a senzilla tower and it aim was to sight enemies and to provide a defensive system. It was also called “Signal Tower” due to the signals it sent to the castle of Cagliari to communicate the transit of ships.
- Tower of Marceddì: this is also known as the “Old Tower” to distinguish it from the “New Tower” nearby. It was built in 1580 and was part of the defensive system of the Gulf of Oristano, designed by Don Marcantonio Camos and commissioned by King Philip of Spain to ward off frequent attacks by the Saracens. It was connected to the Tower of Capo Frasca (or Torre Nuova), the Tower Grande, the Torre of Saint Giovanni and the Tower of Capo San Marco
- Tower of Carcangiolas: this tower, also called "Tower Crangiolu", was built on Poetto beach at the end of the 16th century by the Spaniards, in the municipality of Quartu Saint Elena. During the Second World War, it was restructured for defensive purposes and was used as an observation point. It later became a ruin after a storm, and it was further depleted by marine erosion and the retreat of the coastline in recent years.
- Tower of Poetto: this semi-ruined building is a small coastal tower located on the promontory of the Devil's Saddle in Cagliari. The tower owes its name to the Pouhet, the cockpit near a Roman cistern. The tower was used to communicate with the coastal towers of the Gulf of Cagliari, the Tower of Mezza Spiaggia and the Tower of Isola dei Cavoli.
- Tower of Prezzemolo - Tower of Lazzaretto: it is located near the village of Saint Elia, close to a former hospital of this district of Cagliari, to which it owes its name "Tower of Lazzaretto". It was built in the first decades of the 16th century but was abandoned in 1638 following the construction of the Tower of Calamosca. The tower's main purpose was to guard over the Gulf of Angels and it could also communicate directly with the castle.

Due to their age, the towers can be found in a variety of conditions and can be divided into three categories: excellent, normal, and poor.

List of Towers by Condition
Excellent	Normal	Poor
Tower of Sa Scafa - Torre della Quarta Regia	Tower of San Macario	Tower of Su loi - Torre degli Ulivi
Tower of Coltellazzo - Torre di Sant'Efisio	Tower of Cala D'ostia	Tower of Antigori
Tower of Chia	Tower of Piccinì	Tower Zavorra
Tower of Capo Malfatano	Tower of Budello	Tower of The Devil
Tower of Cannai	Tower of Portoscuso	Tower of Capo Spartivento
Tower of Calasetta	Tower of Porto Paglia	Tower of Porto Scuro - Torre di Porto Scudo
Tower of Saint Vittorio	Tower of Cala Domestica	Tower of Cala Piombo
Tower of Su Pottu - Torre di Cabras	Tower of Capo Frasca - Torre Nuova	Tower of Cala Piombo
Tower of Pischeredda	Tower of Marceddì	Tower of Porto Pino (Collapsed)
Tower of Saint Giovanni di Sinis	Tower Grande	Tower of Palmas
Tower of Seu	Tower of Capo San Marco	Tower of Fontanamare (Collapsed)
Tower of Bosa	Tower of Scab'e Sai	Tower of Flumentorgiu - Torre dei Corsari
Tower Argentina	Tower of Saint Caterina di Pittinuri	Tower of Sa Mora
Tower of Capo Galera	Tower of Columbargia	Tower of Capo Mannu - Torre di Sa Mesa Longa
Tower of Porto Conte	Tower of Tramariglio	Tower of Saline
Tower of Porticciolo	Tower of Buru	Tower of Su Puttu
Tower of Capo Negro - Torre Negra	Tower of Pelosa	Tower of Foghe
Tower of Falcone	Tower of Isola Piana	Tower of Ischia Ruja
Tower of Trabuccato	Tower of Cala d'oliva	Tower of Badde Jana
Tower of Porto	Tower of Saline	Tower of Poglina - Torre della Speranza
Tower of Abbacurrente	Tower of Frigiano	Tower of Punta Giglio
Tower of Isola Rossa	Tower of Saint Giovanni	Tower of Pegna
Tower of Vignola	Tower of Saint Lucia	Tower Mozza - Torre di Bantile Sale
Tower of Longosardo	Tower of Saint Gemiliano	Tower of Airadu - Torre Bianca
Tower of Saint Maria Navarrese	Tower of Saint Giovanni of Sarrala	Tower of Cala d'Arena
Tower of Arbatax	Tower of Murtas	Tower of Saint Reparata (Collapsed)
Tower of Barì	Tower of Monte Ferru	Tower of Capo Bellavista (Collapsed)
Tower of Porto Corallo	Tower of Cala Pira	Tower of Saint Lorenzo
Tower of Fortezza Vecchia	Tower of Porto Giunco	Tower of Death - Torre di Monte Rosso
Tower of Capo Boi	Tower of Isola dei Cavoli	Tower of Porta - Torre dei Dieci Cavalli
Tower of Cala Regina	Tower of Cala Regina	Tower of Salinas
Tower of Mezza Spiaggia	Tower of Foxi	Tower of Saint Luigi
Tower of Calamosca - Torre dei Segnali	Tower of Su Fengu	Tower of Cala Caterina (Collapsed)
Tower of Prezzemolo - Tower of Lazzaretto		Tower of Mortorio
		Tower of Saint Andrea (Collapsed)
		Tower of Carcangiolas
		Tower of Poetto
		Tower of Saint Elia
		Tower of Cala Fichera

== Flora and Fauna ==
The Path of 100 Towers crosses two principal types of ecosystems: the typical Mediterranean scrub and lagoon.

=== Mediterranean scrub ===
The Mediterranean scrub is characterized by the abundance of forests and scrub in locations where the Mediterranean climate predominates: dry and arid summers, warm autumns, springs with a lot of rainfall, and mild winters. The area is very sensitive to desertification and vulnerable to forest fires, due to a predominantly arid biome, with xerophytic vegetation (adapted to arid or dry places) and little biodiversity.

Typical flora includes shrub and tree species that have similar characteristics, which make them able to tolerate strong onshore winds, as well as periods of aridity of the land. Myrtle, laurel, rosemary, juniper, and genisteae are the typical plants.

Typical fauna of this ecosystem include a diverse range of mammals, reptiles, birds, amphibians, and insects.

Mammals one can encounter along this route include: fallow deer, wild boars, foxes, and squirrels. There are also various species of reptiles such as turtles, vipers, and lizards.

=== Lagoon ===
The lagoons are characterized by large shallow bodies of both fresh and salt water, separated from the deep waters of the sea by natural barriers formed by sand dunes or coral reefs.

With regards to the flora, this includes the following species: Marsh Samphire (Salicornia herbacea), Sea Blite (Sueda maritima), Reed (Phragmites australis), and Narrowleaf Cattail (Typha angustifolia).

The lagoon is also the habitat of small mammals (rodents and insectivores), insects, small gastropods (e.g. Gibula albida), crustaceans, annelids, water snakes (Natrix natrix), and marsh turtles.

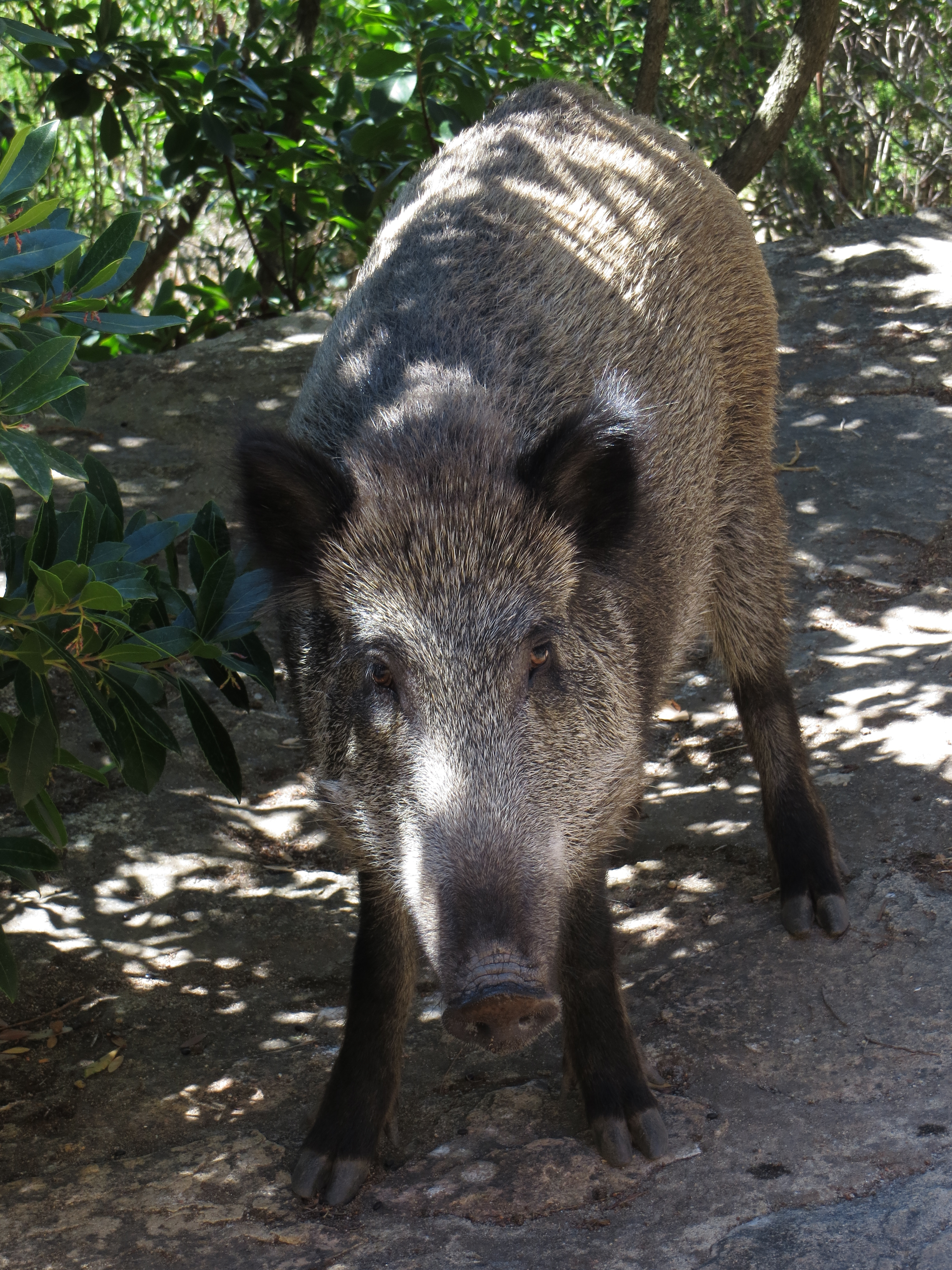
Sardinian Wild Boar

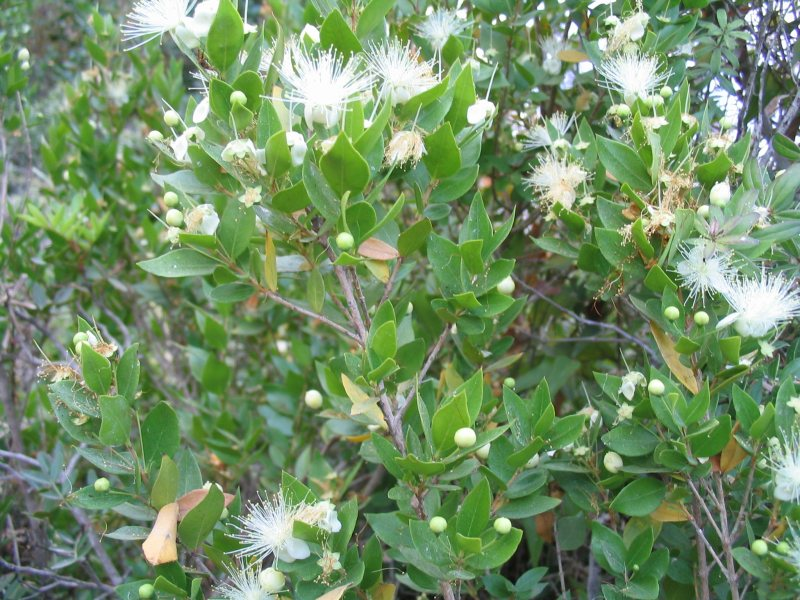
Sardinian Myrtus

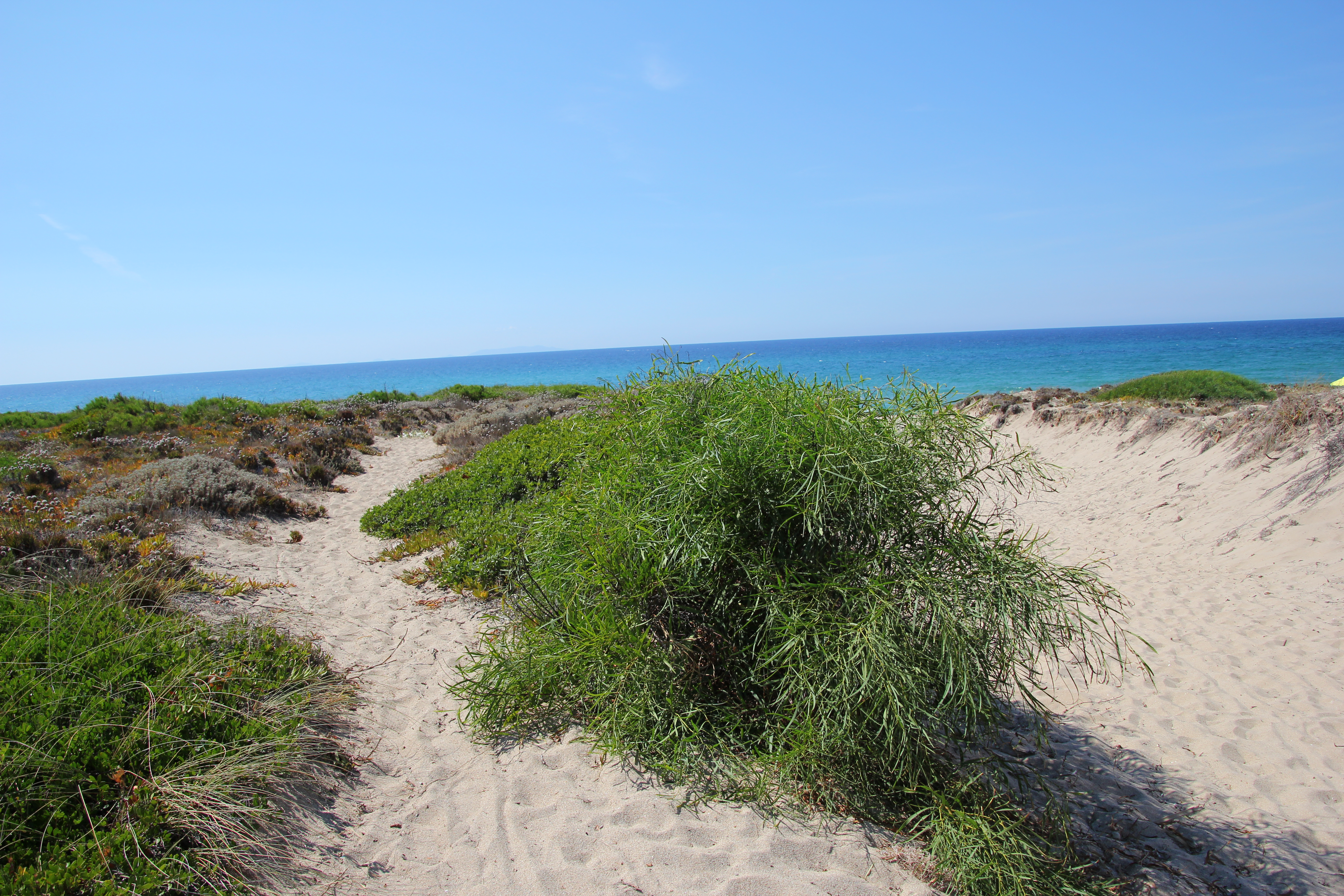
Sand dunes

== Books ==
There are several books and guides specifically about the Path of 100 Towers. Many of these are in Italian. They include:

- Guida al Cammino 100 Torri (2019)
- Passaporto Del Camminatore (2018)

They are both in Italian and they are written by Nicola Melis.

== Curiosities ==
- A printed pass called the Pilgrim Passport (Passaporto Del Camminatore) is available for individuals who travel the path. It provides the holder with access to different structures on the route. The pass can also be used to record that the different streets have been completed when a "testimonium" is stamped on it. The certificate of the completion of the total path is given by 8 "testimonium", which are provided by different accommodation structures along the path, stating the date and the place of the stamp. The 8 testimonium are:
1. Testimonium Via del Martirio
2. Testimonium Via delle Miniere
3. Testimonium Via Cataluna
4. Testimonium Via Gallura
5. Testimonium Via Ogliastra
6. Testimonium Via Sarcapos
7. Testimonium Via degli Angeli
8. Testimonium Sant'Efisio
- In 2013 an association was created, named "Cammino100torri", by a group of individuals that were crossing from Torre Salinas to the "Torre of the Ten Horses". The members organize meetings with expert guides, and individuals can join organized groups to explore some of the more hidden parts of the path. The association also provides a list of accommodation, fountains, restaurants, and beach bars.

== Similar treks ==
- Selvaggio Blu (Sardinia)
- "Sentiero dell'Inglesiente" (Sardinia)
- "Cammino di Santa Barbara" (Sardinia)
- "Traversata del Golfo di Orosei" (Sardinia)
- "Path of the Gods" (Amalfi coast)
- "Cammino del Salento" (Puglia)
- "Mediterranean path" (Basilicata)
- "Path 309 of the Mount Conero" (Marche)
- "Montecristo Island" (Tuscany)
- "Blue trail" (Liguria)
- "The path L'infinito" (Liguria)
- "Sentiero di Stromboli" (Sicily)

== See also ==
- Sardinia
- Trekking
- Hiking equipment
- Cagliari
- Gallura
- Castelsardo
- List of tourist attractions in Sardinia

== Gallery ==
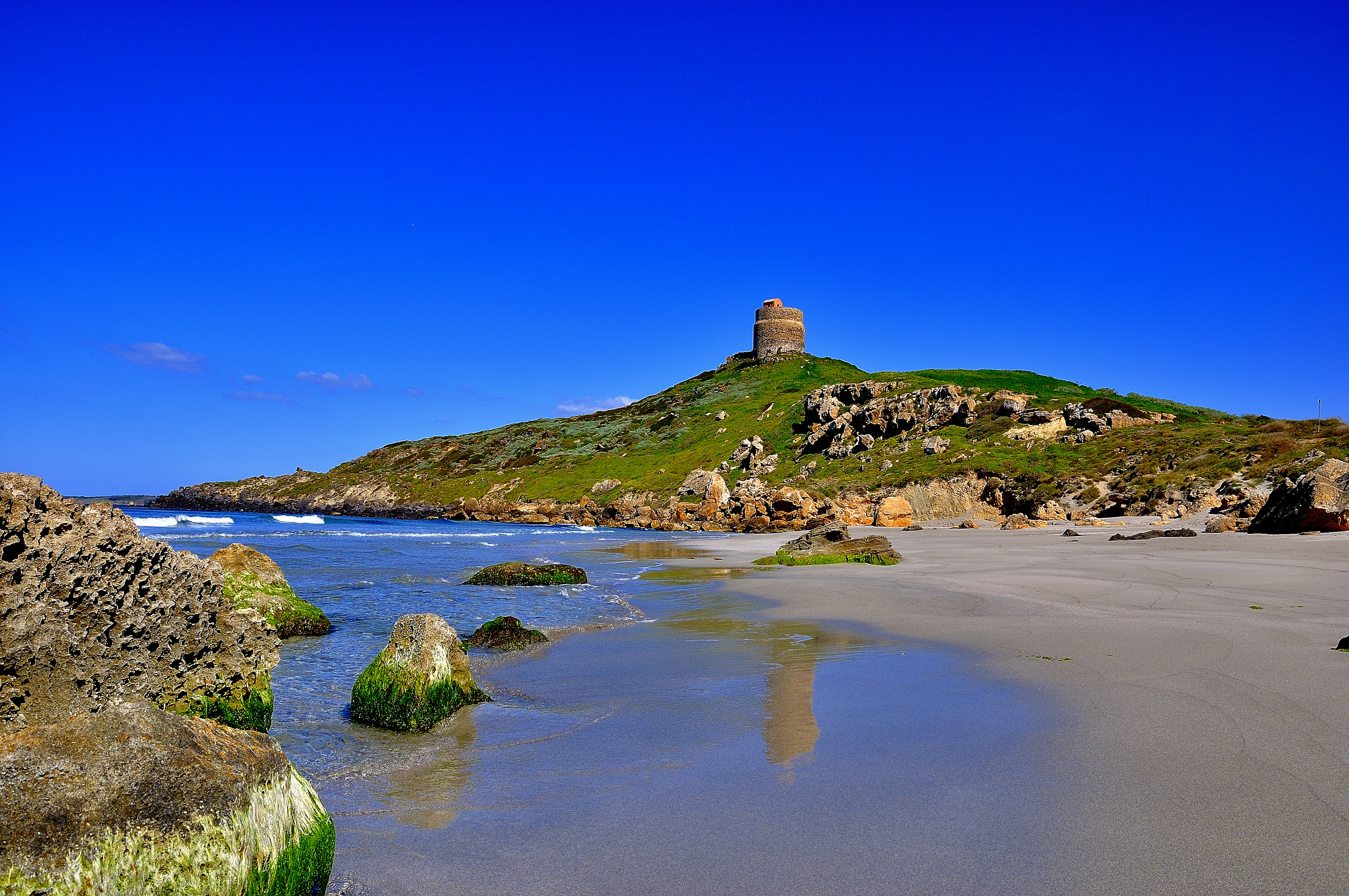
The Spanish tower of San Giovanni Sinis dominates the entire peninsula of Capo San Marco and the archaeological site of Tharros.

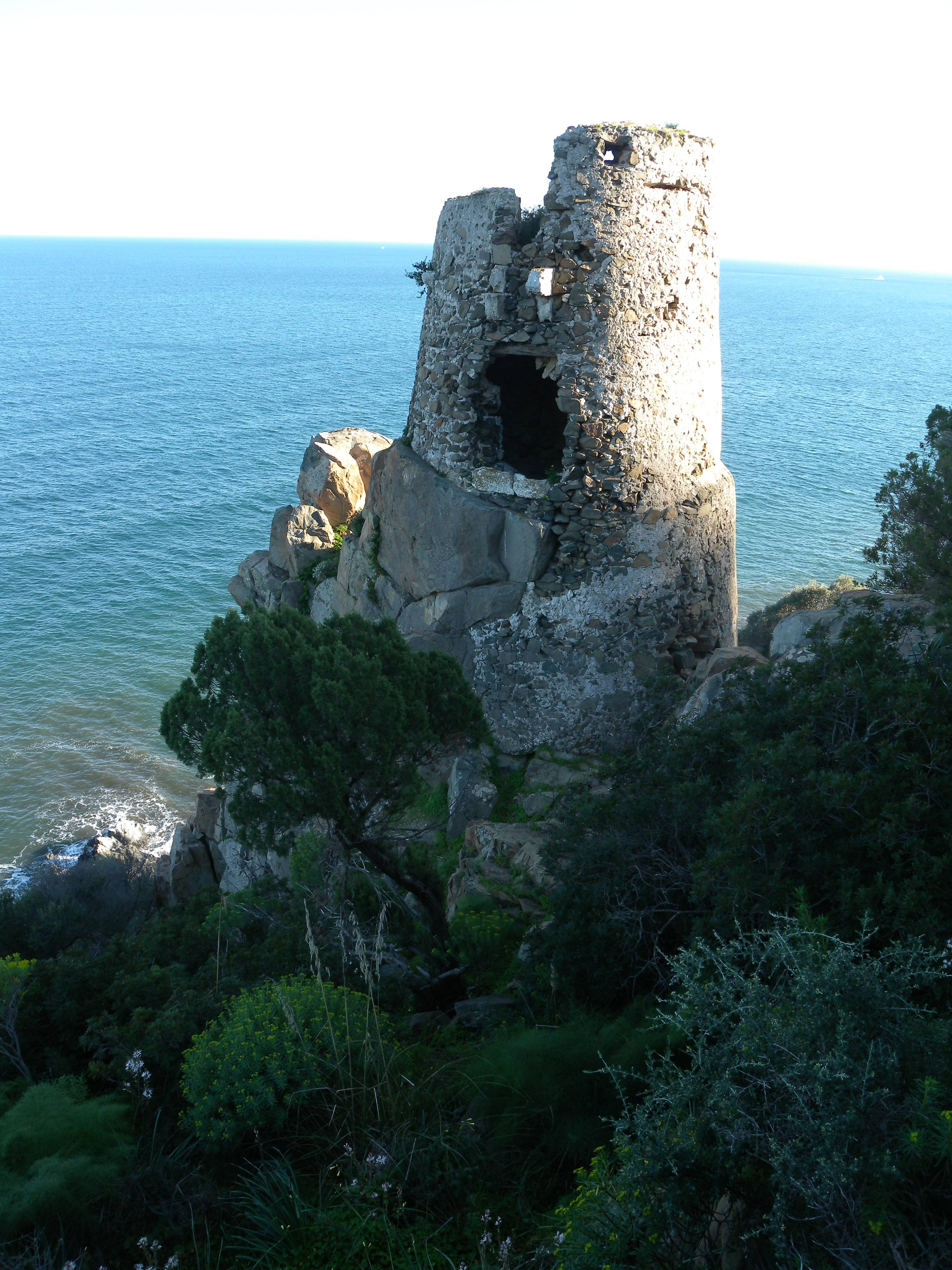
The Devil's tower, also known in Sardinia as "Sa Turri e Su Scolliu", rises on the headland of Punta Zavorra.

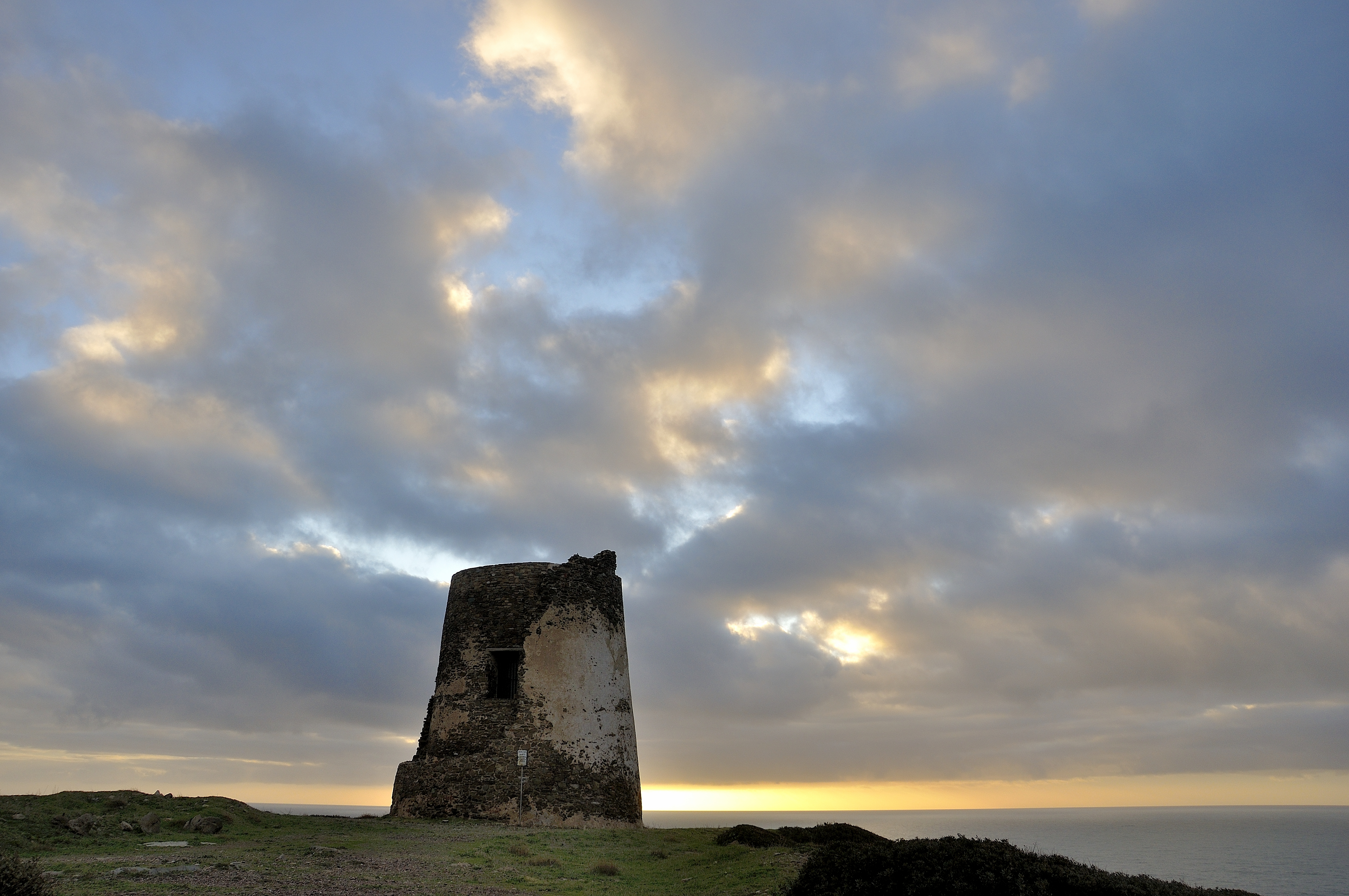
Tower Flumentorgiu - Torre dei Corsari was catalogued by the Spaniards among the Torri des Armas because it was able to respond to any type of naval fire.

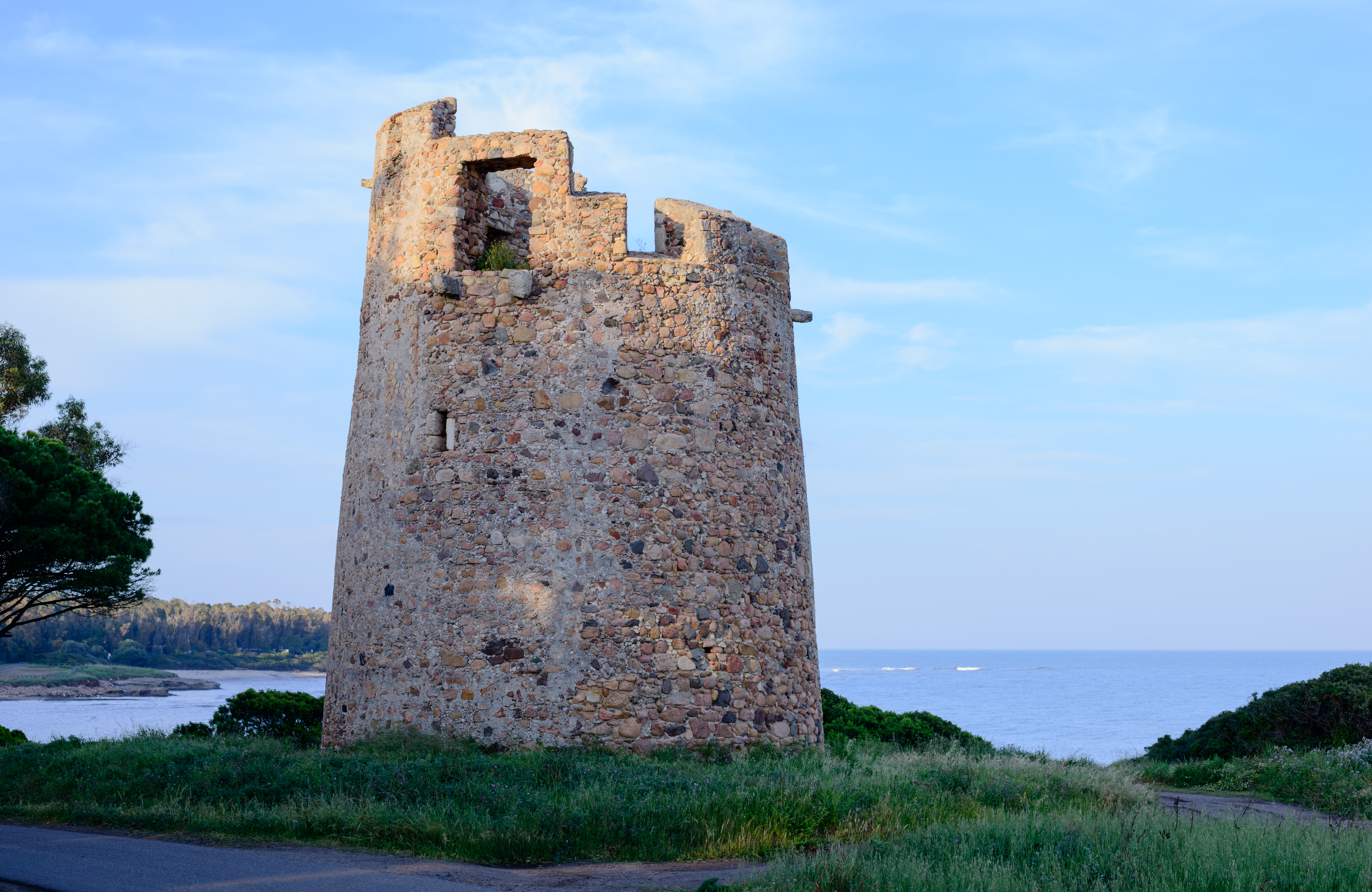
Tower of Cala d'Ostia is a watchtower, located on the promontory of Cala d'Ostia, in Santa Margherita, a small fraction of Pula.

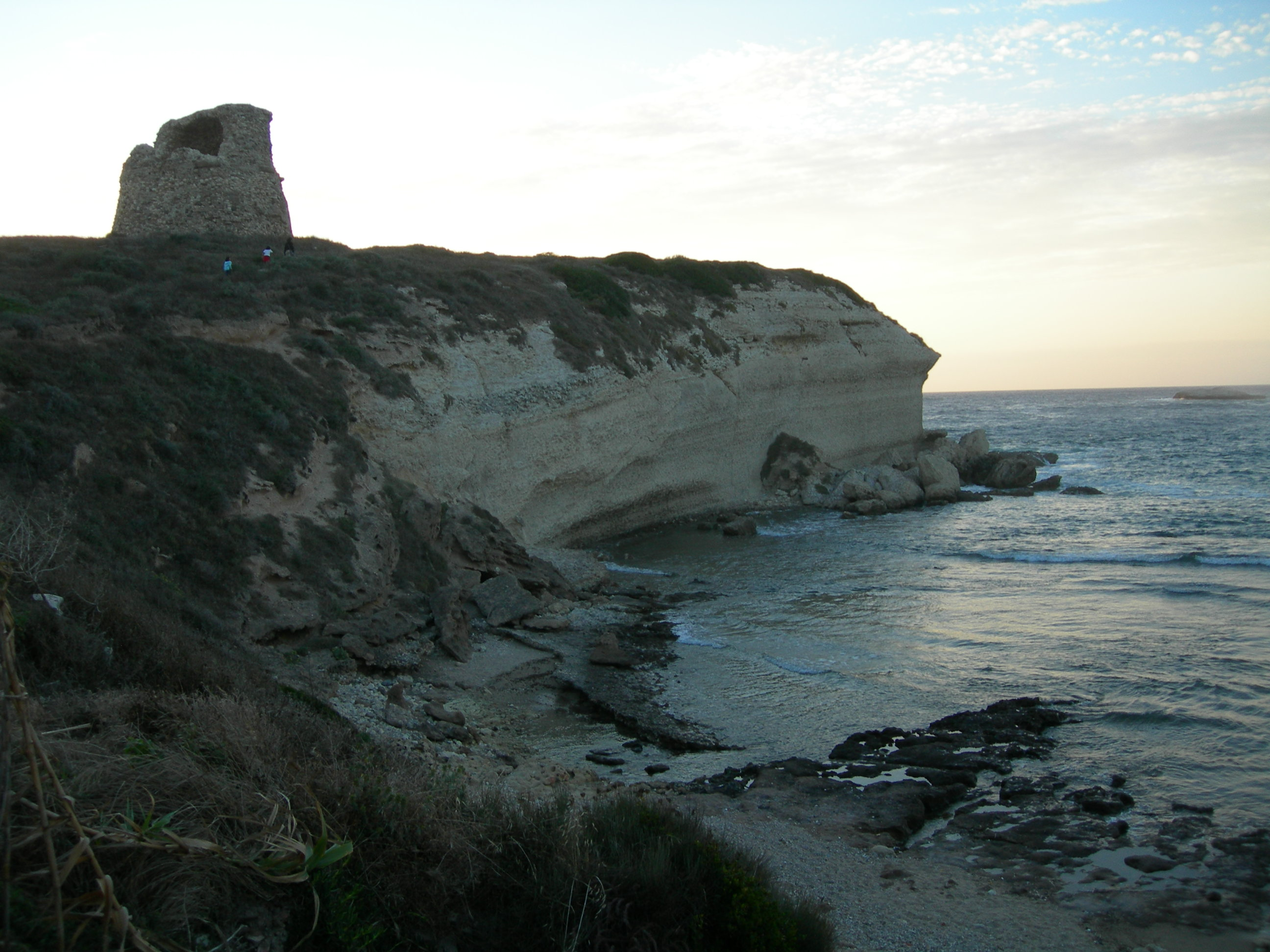
Tower of Su Puttu once served as a watch tower to safeguard the island from invaders from the sea.

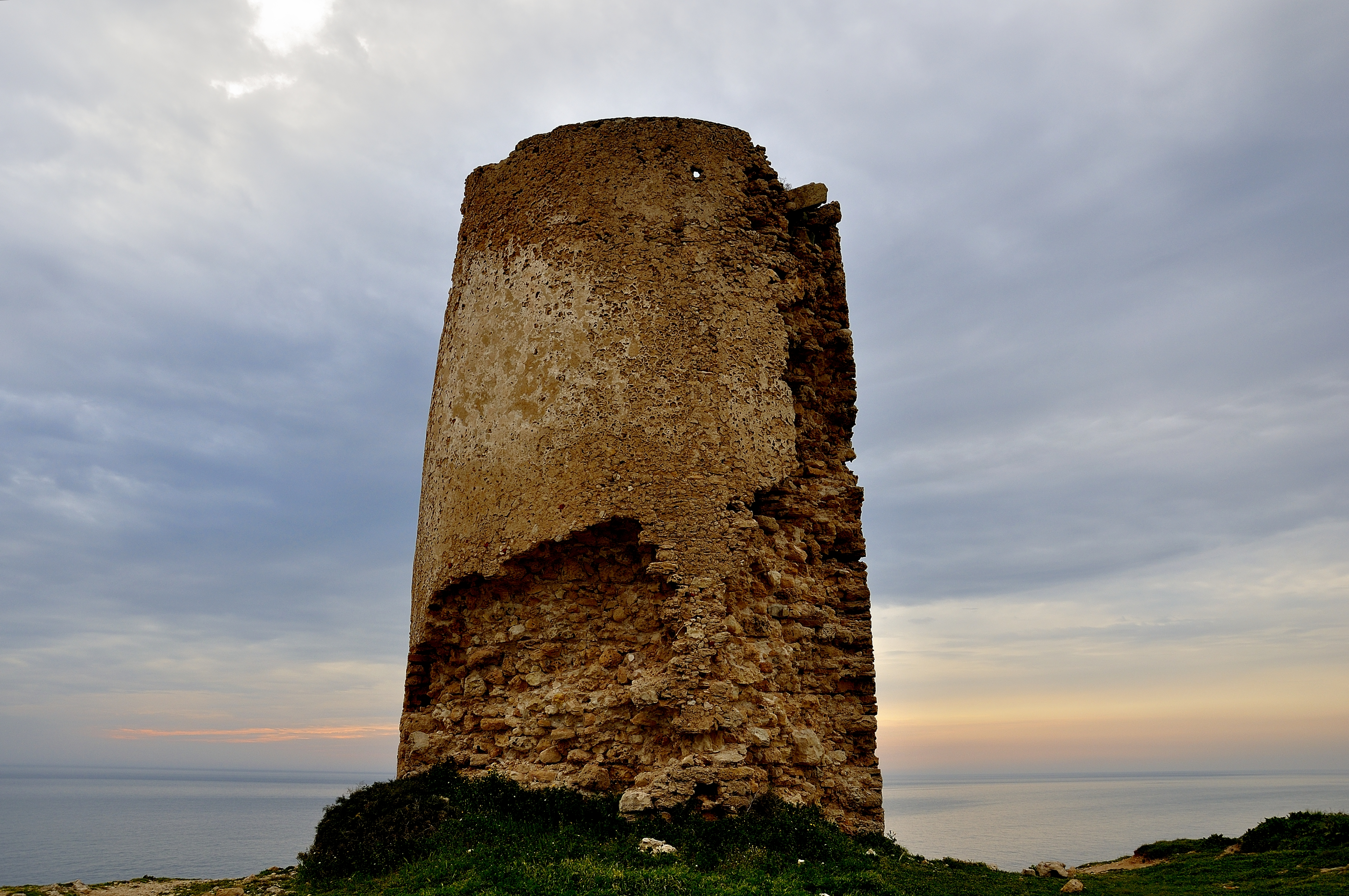
Tower of Sa Mora at the beginning was catalogued among the Senzillas and it was changed in a Torre de Armas in 1801.
