= Ampurias =

Ampurias may refer to:

- Spanish name for Empúries, an ancient Greek city on the Mediterranean coast of Catalonia, Spain
- Diocese of Ampurias, or Castelsardo, in Sardinia, Italy
