= Castellanese dialect =

Corsican dialect

Castellanese
- Caltiddanu
- Native to: Italy
- Region: Sardinia
- Ethnicity: Sardinians
- Native speakers: c. 5,500
- Language family: Indo-European: Italic; Latino-Faliscan; Latin; Romance; Italo-Western; Italo-Dalmatian; Italo-Romance; Tuscan; Corsican; Castellanese
- Dialects: Sedinese
- Writing system: Latin script

Language codes
- ISO 639-3: –
- Glottolog: None
- Castelsardo, the area where the Castellanese dialect is spoken.

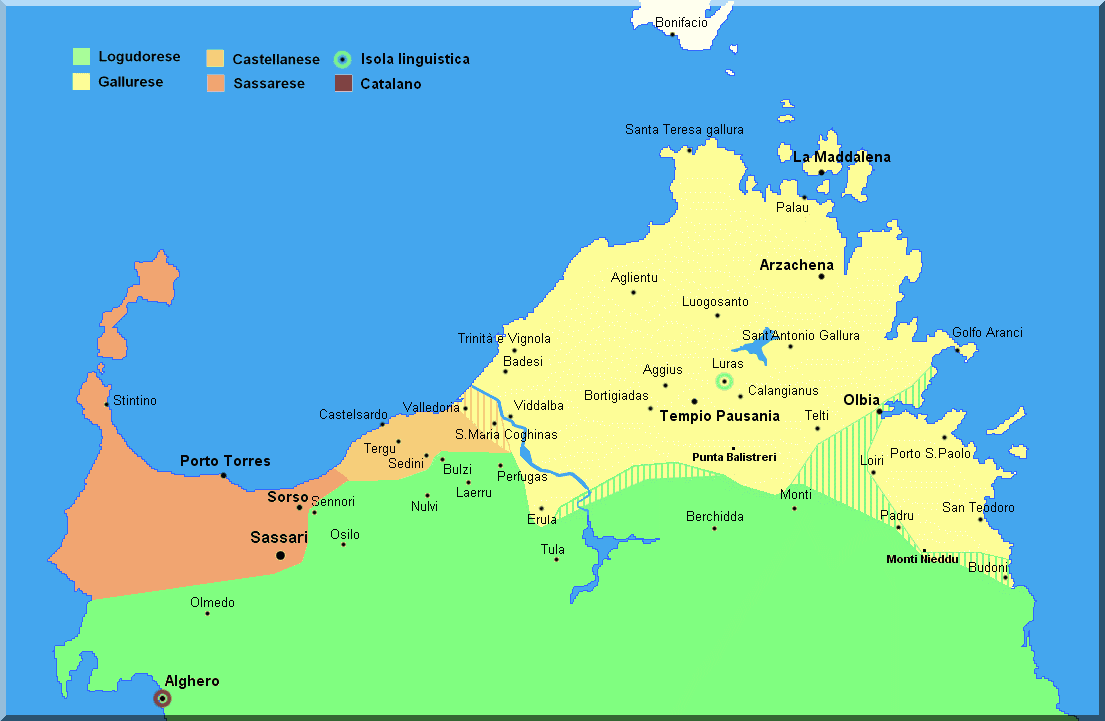
- Map of languages in northern Sardinia, including Castellanese.

Castellanese is a dialect of Corsican spoken in the municipalities of Castelsardo, Sedini, Tergu and in some hamlets of Valledoria. It is a transitional variety between Gallurese and Sassarese.

It has a morphological and lexical basis of Corsican origin while the syntax is shared with Sardinian. On the phonetic level it has been influenced by medieval Ligurian and more recently by Sassarese. Alongside some Ligurian archaisms dating back to the Doria domination, it presents a significant number of Logudorese Sardinian words. Castellanese is spoken by approximately 5,500 people (almost all in the municipality of Castelsardo).

The Castellanese dialect appears to be little open to linguistic innovation, as demonstrated by the fact that many words and constructions typical of ancient Corsican-Tuscan, lost elsewhere, are still in use in the village. Castellanese also has Catalan and Spanish terms due to the Aragonese conquest of 1448.

It is considered by Ethnologue, Glottolog, and some authors to be a variety of Sassarese, given that it shares the same isoglosses with the latter, while other authors consider it an independent variety. Although it lies within the Sardinian-Corsican dialect continuum, it shares its isoglosses with the Western Romance languages and Sardinian, which distinguish it from the Italo-Romance group, such as the voicing of intervocalic voiceless stops and other features.

== History ==
The origin of the language dates back to around the 13th century following the arrival of a large number of Corsican people who ended up representing the majority of the population, to which were added Ligures, Tuscans and Sardinians who together constituted the varied population of the city newly founded by the Dorias.

== Variants ==
The only variant of Castellanese is Sedinese, which was spoken in the municipalities of Sedini, Tergu, in some hamlets of Valledoria and in the Castellanese hamlets of Pedra Sciolta, Multeddu, San Giovanni and Terra Bianca.

== Concordances with other languages or dialects ==
Castellanese presents notable similarities with the Corsican variant known as "Taravesu" , with which it shares many phonemes: personal pronouns eddu/edda/eddi, cacuminals only for -ll, retention of the -gl group, transition from the -rb group to -rr, retention of the intervocalic v, development of the Latin short vowels to -e/-o. The most important characteristics of Castellanese can be identified in:

- Clarity of pronunciation of the groups -ghj- and -chj- (agghju, magghju)
- Pronunciation of the initial -v- (vinu, vacca)
- Pronunciation of the intervocalic -v- although extremely aspirated and barely perceptible (eva, avè, avà, nevi, ghjuvintù) a characteristic present in Corsican ("Ajaccino", "Taravesu", etc.), but with numerous exceptions, in fact the elision of the intervocalic V is not unusual as in Gallura (tuaglia, nou)
- Preservation of short Latin vowels in many terms (mushca, culpa, umbra, pulpu etc.) a characteristic that places it alongside southern Corsican and Gallurese, while in other contexts we see the singular development in e/o as in the northern and central-southern Corsican and in the above-mentioned "taravesu" and the dialects of the Ajaccio basin:
- Cacuminal only for -ll-; but with sporadic examples of cacuminal also for -gl- (paddagghju)
- Change of -ce-, -ci- and -ge-, -gi- (lugi, vogi, pagi);
- Modification -rn → -rr- (forru, carri, corru);
- Results eddu/edda/eddi;
- Varied conservative lexicon.

== Toponyms ==
- Sossu (Sorso)
- Codaruina (Valledoria)
- Poltudorra (Porto Torres)
- Zelgu (Tergu)
- Viddaeccia (Viddalba)
- Pelfigga (Perfugas)

== Excerpts ==
Below are excerpts of phrases in Castellanese with the translation into Italian.

Castellanese	Italian	English
Eu soggu di Calteddu	Io sono di Castelsardo	I am from Castelsardo
Cosa sei fendi	Cosa stai facendo	What are you doing
Soggu magnendi	Sto mangiando	I'm eating
Chilhtu è Mario	Questo è Mario	This is Mario

== Books ==
The writer Giuseppe Tirotto wrote some books in Castellanese, such as:

- Lu bastimentu di li sogni di sciumma
- L'umbra di lu soli
- Cumenti oru di neuli
- La forma di l'ànima
- La casa e la chisura
- Lu bàsgiu di la luna matrona
- E semmu andaddi cantendi...
- Cumentisisia t'avaràgghju amà..
- La tuaglia ruia

== Examples ==
Below is a text in Castellanese with the translation into Italian and English:

Castellanese :

«Soggu naddu in Calteddu e v'agghju passaddu li megli'anni di la mè ghjuivintù. M'ammentu cand'èrami piccinni chi li nosthri mammi ci mandavani da pal noi a fàcci lu bagnu. Tandu la spiagghja era piena di rena, senza scogli né rocchi e si sthaggia ori finz'a candu, biàtti da lu freddu andagiami a vultulacci in chidda rena buddendi da lu soli. Dabboi l'ultima cabucina pà buggacci la rena attaccadda a la pèddi e turravami in casa chi lu soli era ghjà caladdu, a l'ora di cena. Candu fagia bughju à noi piccinni ci mandavani a fà ganci, cù la lugi chi vi vulia pà inniscà l'àmi pà piscà. Ni pigliavami assai e daboi in casa li mittìami drent'a un saccheddu sarraddu in cucina. Un mangianu chi ci n'erami pisaddi chi era sempri bugghju, candu semmu andaddi à piglià lu sacchettu era boiddu é li ganci ghjiràvani pàl tutti li càmmari è v'é vuludda più di mezz'ora pà accuglinnili tutti.»

Italian:

«Sono nato a Castelsardo e vi ho passato gli anni migliori della mia giovinezza. Ricordo, quando eravamo ragazzi, che le nostre mamme ci mandavano da soli a fare il bagno. Allora la spiaggia era piena di sabbia, senza scogli né rocce e si stava in mare delle ore fino a quando, paonazzi dal freddo poi ci andavamo a rotolare in quella sabbia bollente dal sole. Poi l'ultimo tuffo per levarci la sabbia attaccata alla pelle e ritornavamo a casa che il sole era già calato, all'ora di cena. Quando faceva buio noi ragazzi ci mandavano a fare granchi, con la luce, che serviva per mettere l'esca agli ami per pescare. Ne raccoglievamo in quantità poi in casa li mettevamo in un sacchetto chiuso in cucina. Una mattina in cui ci eravamo alzati che era ancora buio, quando siamo andati a prendere il sacchetto era vuoto e i granchi giravano per tutte le camere e c'è voluta più di mezz'ora per raccoglierli tutti.»

English:

«I was born in Castelsardo and spent the best years of my youth there. I remember, when we were kids, our mothers sending us out alone to swim. Back then, the beach was sandy, with no rocks or cliffs, and we'd stay in the sea for hours, until, red from the cold, we'd roll in the sun-baked sand. Then, one last dive to wash off the sand clinging to our skin, and we'd return home when the sun had already set, just before dinnertime. When it got dark, we kids were sent out to catch crabs, using the light to bait the hooks for fishing. We'd collect lots of them, then put them in a closed bag in the kitchen. One morning, when we got up while it was still dark, when we went to get the bag, it was empty and the crabs were wandering around all the rooms, and it took us more than half an hour to collect them all.»

== Bibliography ==
- Pellegrino, Nicola (1 January 2005). Dizionario castellanese. Italiano-dialetto (Vol. 2) (in Italian). Fasano: Schena Editore. p. 256. ISBN 978-8882295929.
- Cossu, Giuseppe (1780). Reale Stamparia (ed.). Notizie sacre e profane delle citta di Sardegna. Tom. 1 (-3): Della citta di Cagliari notizie compendiose sacre e profane compilate da D.G.C. G. e C.G (in Italian). Vol. 1. pp. 368, 208.
- Liviana editrice, ed. (2005). SILTA (in Italian). Vol. 34. p. 526.
- Blasco Ferrer, Eduardo; Koch, Peter; Marzo, Daniela (10 July 2017). Manuale di linguistica sarda (in Italian). Berlin/Boston: Walter de Gruyter GmbH & Co KG. pp. 588, 432. ISBN 9783110274615.
- Mauro Maxia (2010). Studi sardo-corsi. Dialettologia e storia della lingua tra le due isole (2 ed.). Olbia: Taphros.
- Mauro Maxia, Fonetica storica del gallurese e delle altre varietà sardocorse, Olbia, Taphros, 2012.
