= Elephant Rock (Italy) =

Boulder resembling an elephant

Coordinates: 40°53′23″N 8°44′46″E

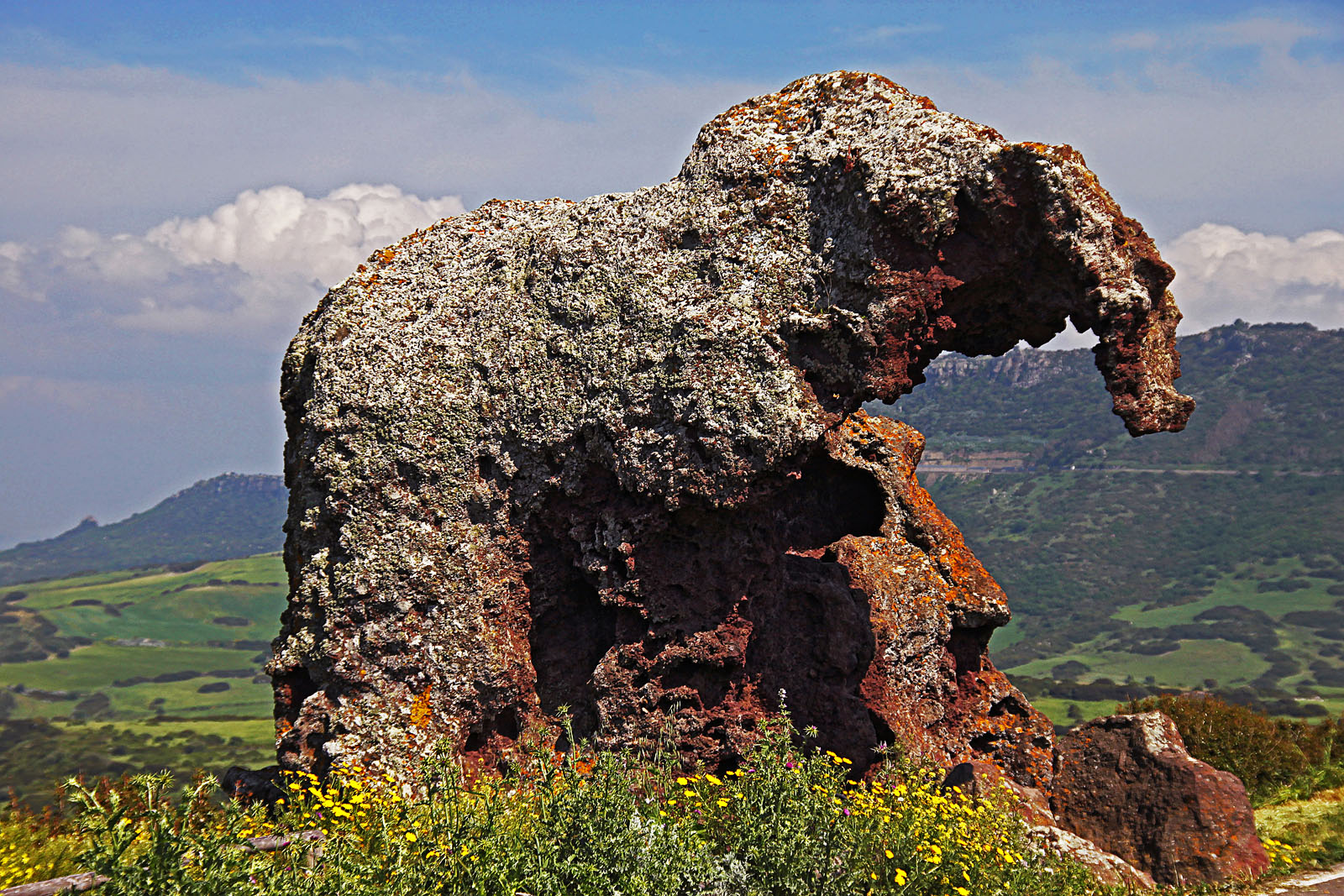
Roccia dell'Elefante

The Elephant's Rock is a large boulder of trachyte and andesite, eroded by the atmospheric agents that gave it the shape of an elephant. It is about 4 m (13 ft) high.

The rock is located near Castelsardo, Sardinia, to the left of the old road that led from the hamlet of Multeddu to the village of Sedini.

The Elephant's Rock has a great archaeological importance, because two domus de janas, ancient tombs dating back to the pre-nuragic period, have been carved inside. In July 2025, this archaeological site was added to the World Heritage Site list as part of the "Funerary Tradition in the Prehistory of Sardinia – The domus de janas" entry.

== Gallery ==
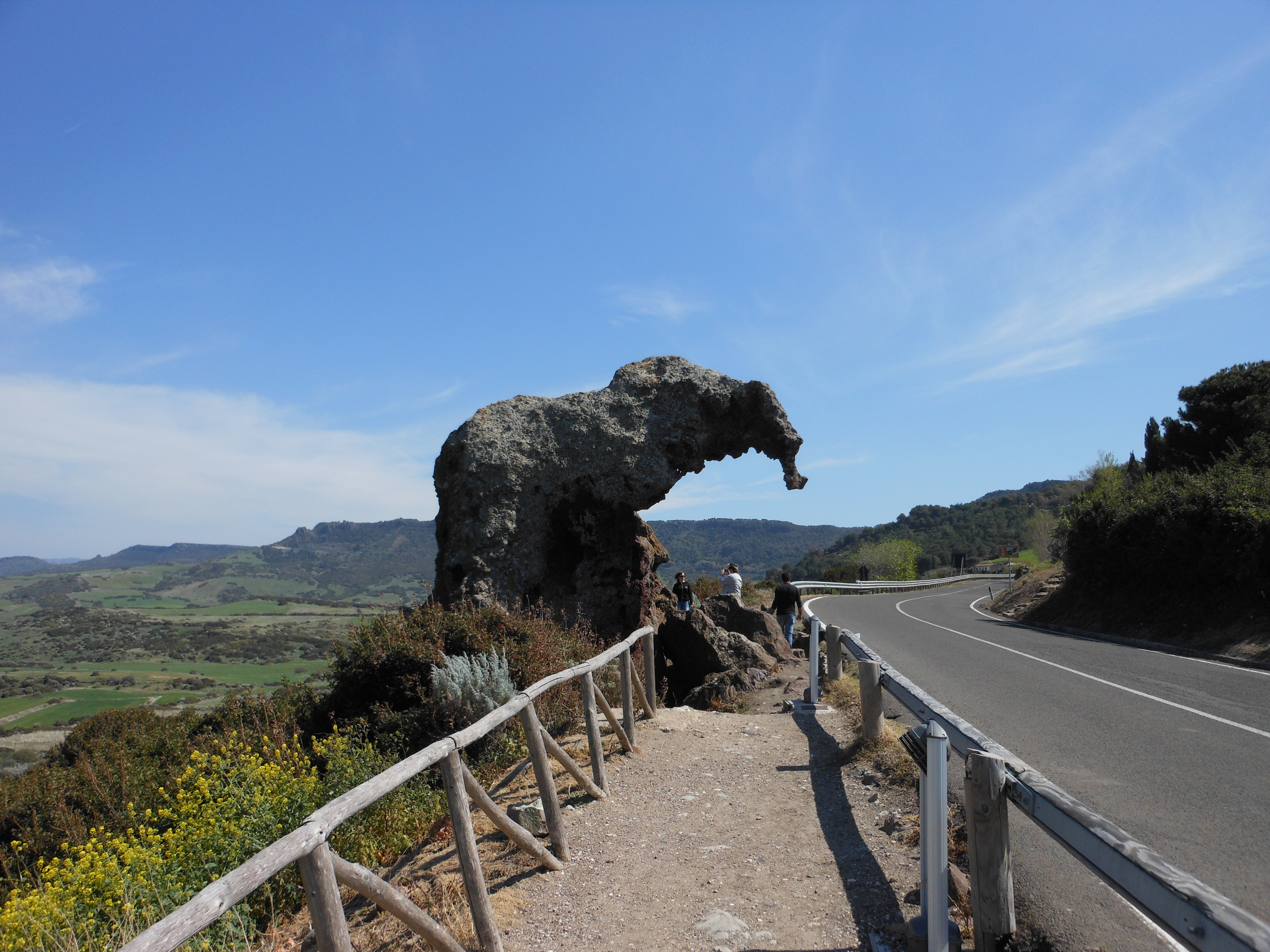
Landscape

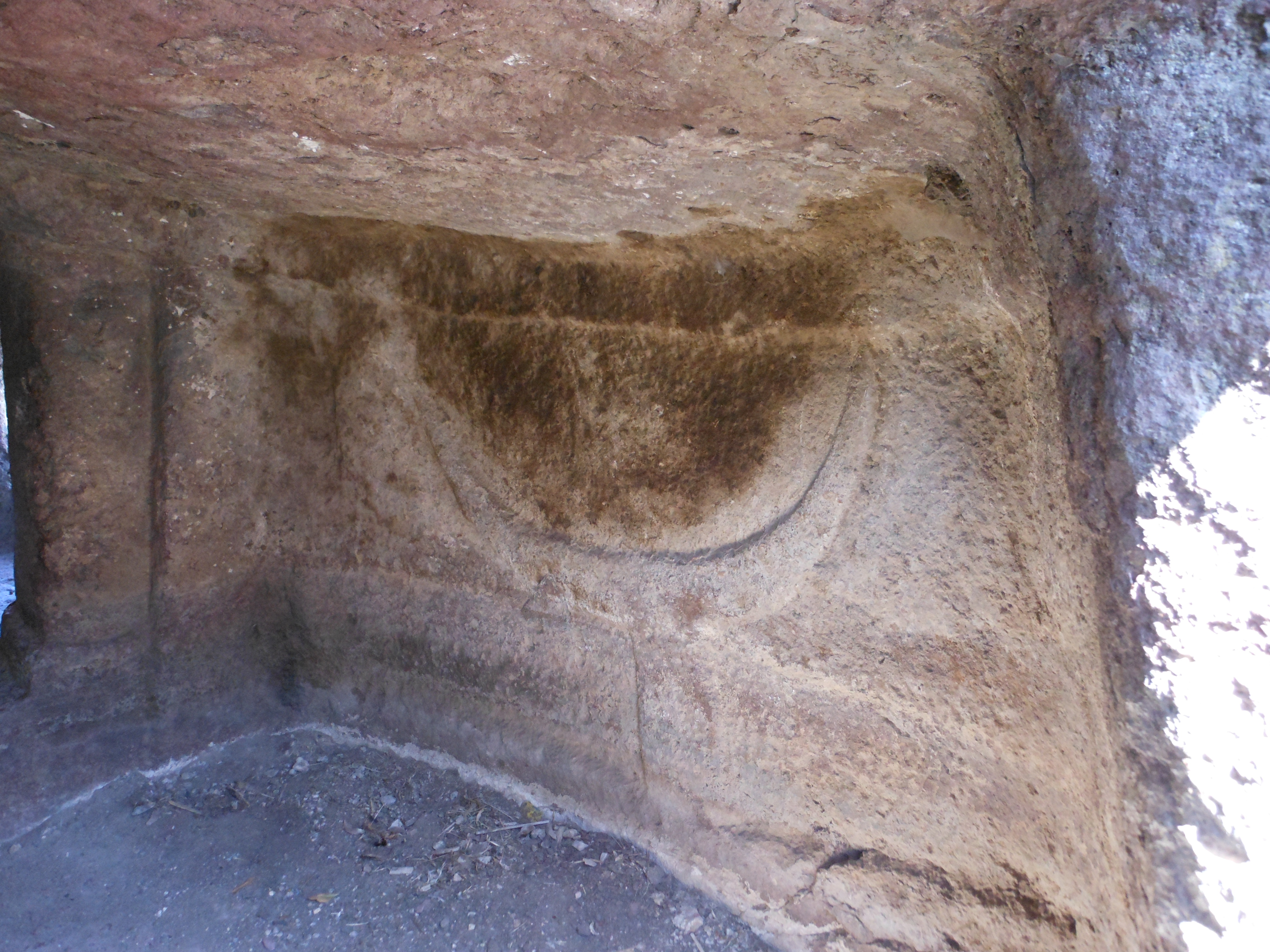
Taurine engraving

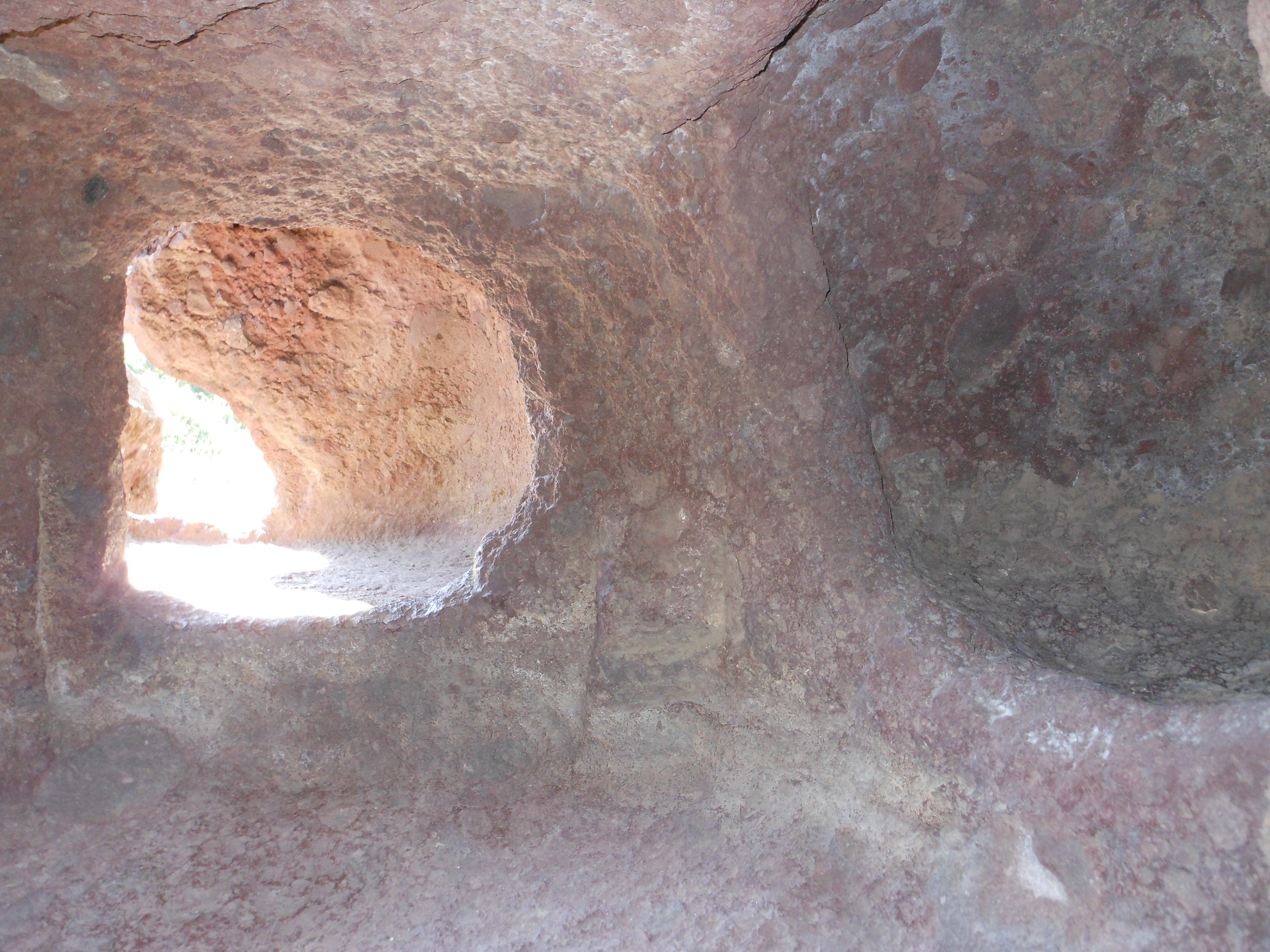
Domus de janas

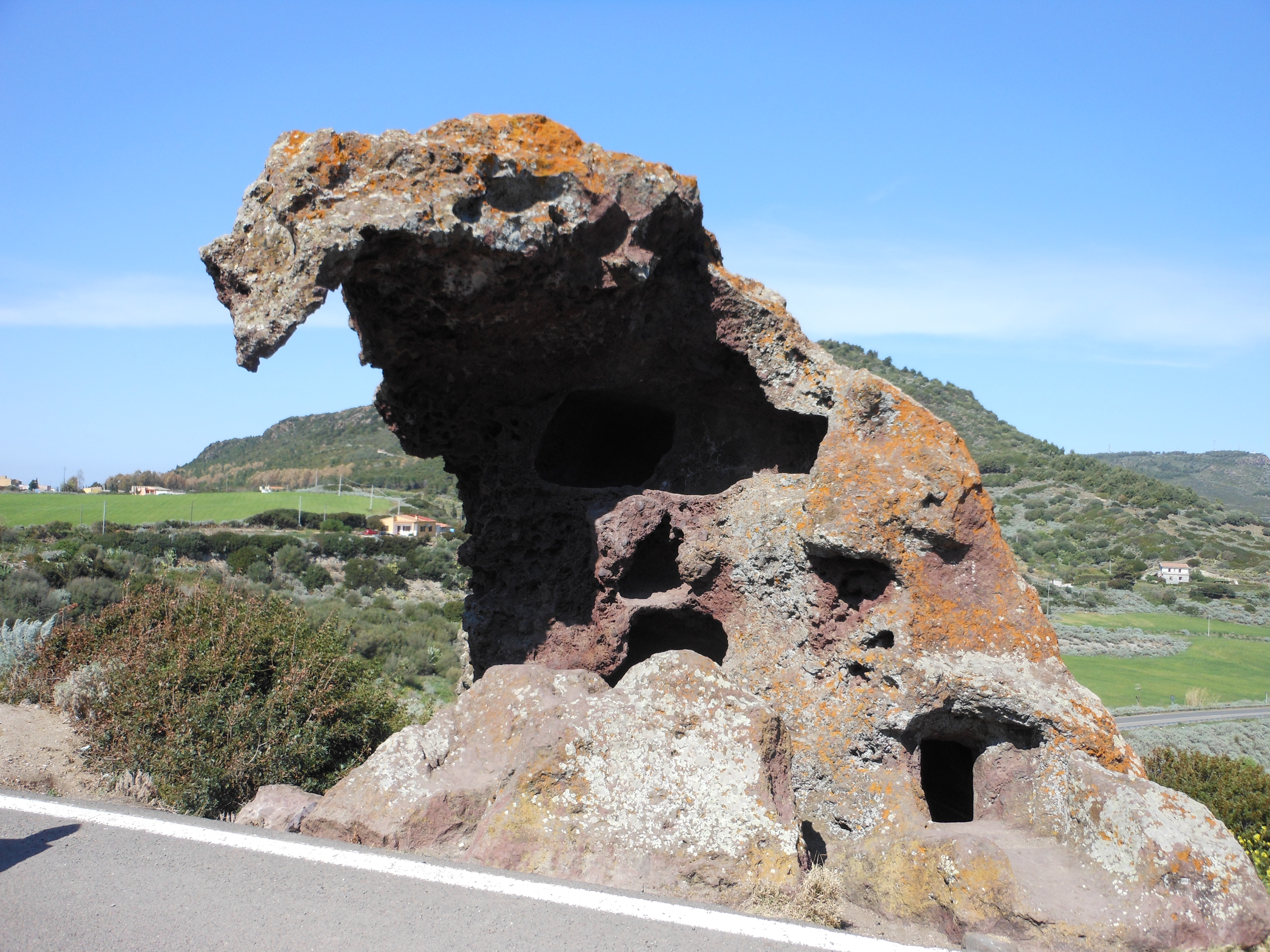
View of the other side
