= Lu Bagnu =

- Frazione
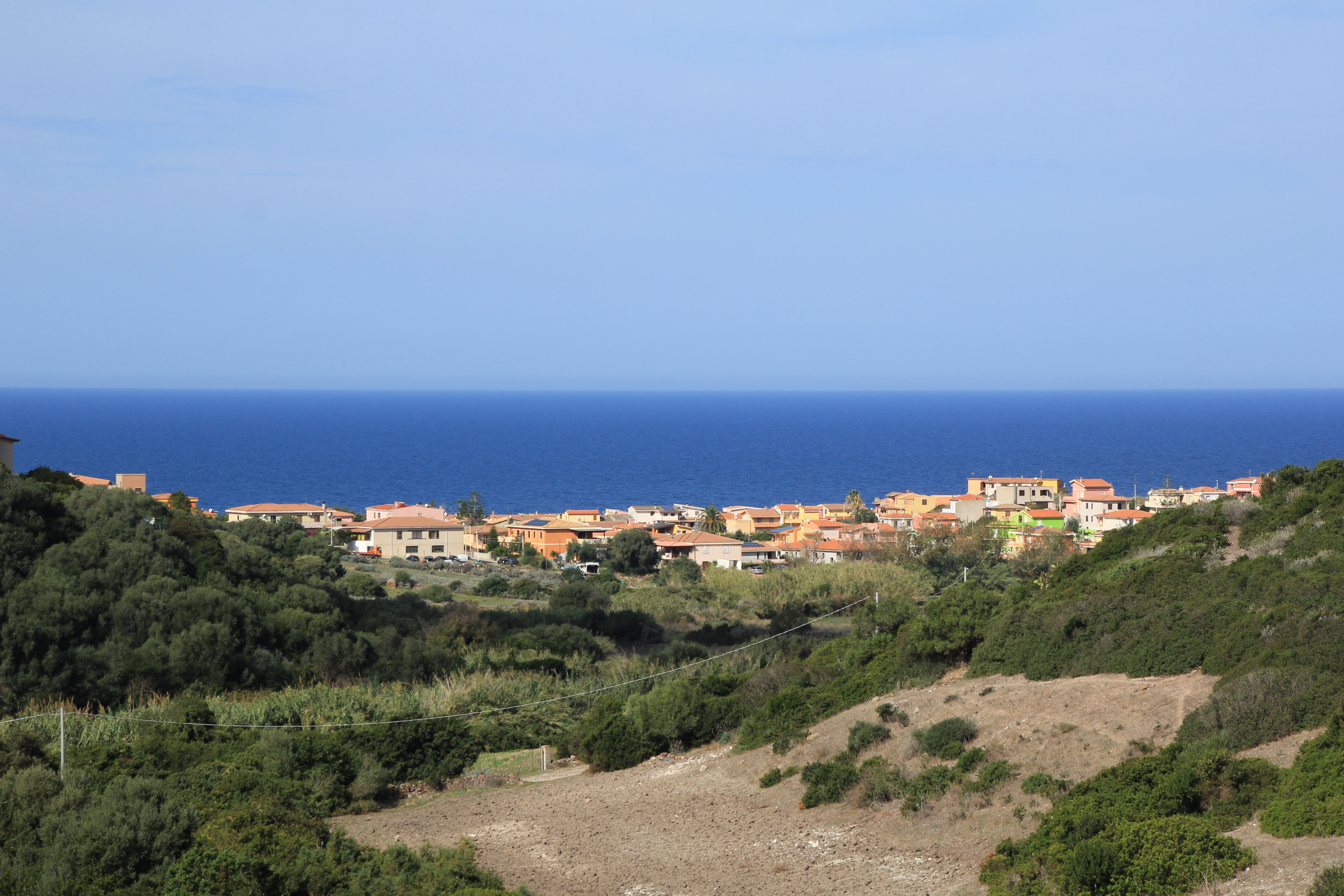

- Location of Lu Bagnu in Italy
- Coordinates: 40.90°N 8.69°E
- Country: Italy
- Region: Sardinia
- Comune: Castelsardo

Population (1-11-2014)
  - Total: 1,664
- Time zone: UTC+1 (CET)
  - Summer (DST): UTC+2 (CEST)
- Postal code: 07031

Lu Bagnu is a hamlet of 1664. inhabitants of the municipality of Castelsardo, in Sassari province, Sardinia, Italy.

This village is located on the coast, west of Castelsardo.

== History ==
The territory of Lu Bagnu were settlements in Roman times; the name Lu Bagnu comes from the ancient thermal baths, of which only a few remains are preserved today. In modern times, the village has grown considerably since the 80s; this growth is mainly due to the increase in the tourist importance of the locality.

== Tourism ==
Lu Bagnu is a well known seaside resort, with many tourists, especially in summer for the beaches.

Between 2015 and 2020, two beaches, Sacro Cuore-Ampurias and Madonnina-Stella Maris, received the blue flag (recognition of European seaside resorts meeting quality criteria).

The sandy coastline of Lu Bagnu is very long and differs from other coastal areas near Castelsardo, mainly rocky; west of the hamlet, near Punta la Capra, there are high vertical cliffs.

== Main sights ==
The parish church of Santa Teresa di Gesù Bambino, built in 2014, is located in Lombardia Street, in the upper part of the village; the church was built using mainly local stones
