= Castelsardo =

Castelsardo Casteddu Sardu (Sardinian) Castheddu Sardhu (Sassarese) Calteddu (Castellanese)
- Comune
- Comune di Castelsardo
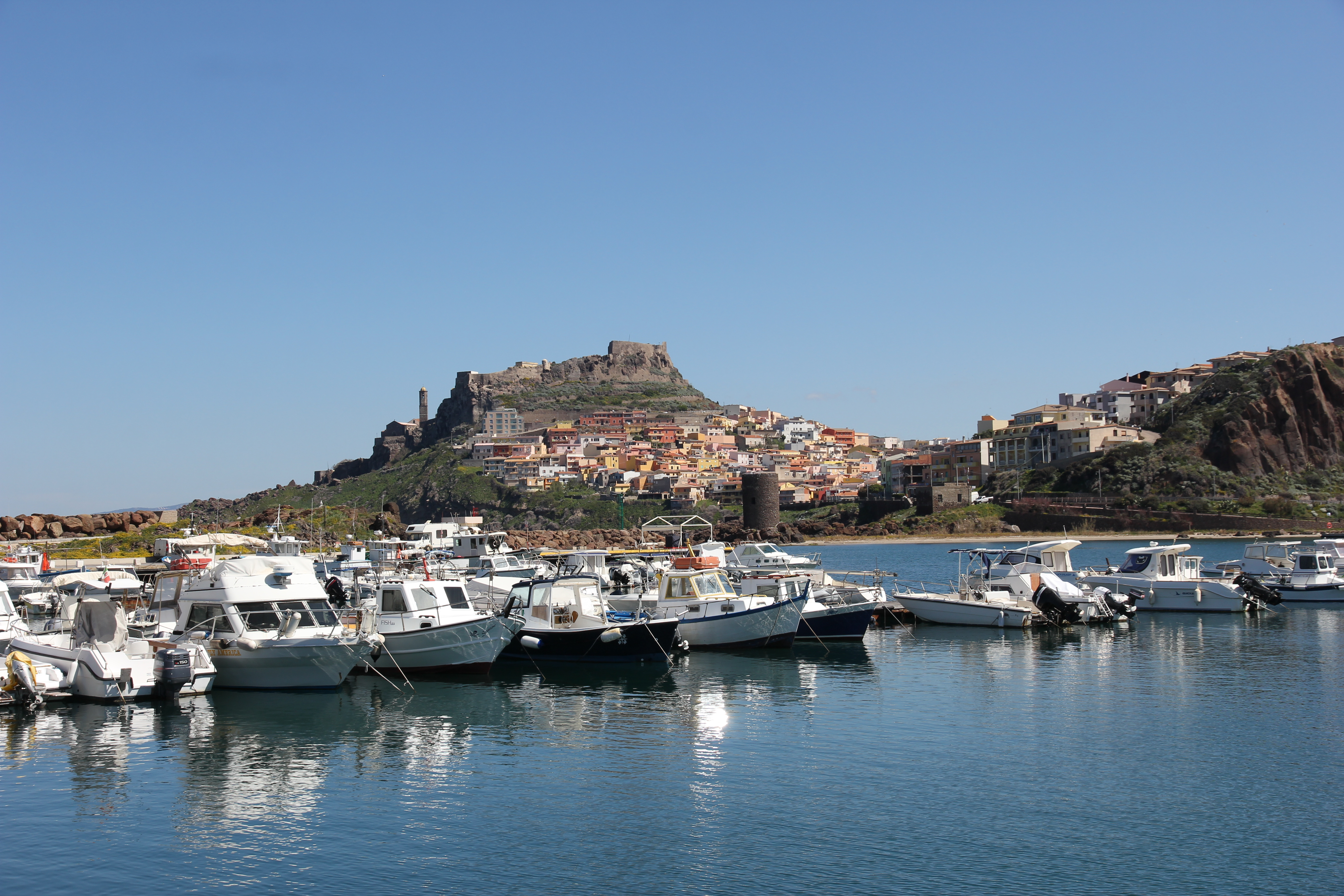
- Port of Castelsardo

- Location within Sardinia
- Coordinates: 40°55′N 8°43′E
- Country: Italy
- Region: Sardinia
- Metropolitan city: Sassari (SS)
- Frazioni: Lu Bagnu, lMulteddu, San Giovanni, Terra Bianca, Pedra Sciolta, Lu Romasinu, Punta Tramontana

Government
  - Mayor: Maria Lucia Tirotto

Area
  - Total: 43.34 km^{2} (16.73 sq mi)
- Elevation: 114 m (374 ft)

Population (2026)
  - Total: 5,624
  - Density: 129.8/km^{2} (336.1/sq mi)
- Demonym: Castellanesi
- Time zone: UTC+1 (CET)
  - Summer (DST): UTC+2 (CEST)
- Postal code: 07031
- Dialing code: 079
- Patron saint: St. Antony
- Saint day: 17 January (17/01)
- Website: Official website

Castelsardo (Sardinian: Casteddu Sardu, Sassarese: Castheddu Sardhu; Castellanese: Calteddu) is a town and comune in the northwest of the island in the Metropolitan City of Sassari in the autonomous island region of Sardinia in Italy, at the east end of the Gulf of Asinara. It has 5,624 inhabitants.

It is one of I Borghi più belli d'Italia ("The most beautiful villages of Italy").

== History ==
Archaeological excavations have revealed human presence in the Castelsardo area since pre-Nuragic and Nuragic times, as well as during the Roman period in Sardinia.

After the fall of the Western Roman Empire, the monastery of Nostra Signora di Tergu was founded nearby, but the current town originates from the castle built here, in 1102 (or 1270), by the Doria family of Genoa. The castle and the village, which gradually formed around it, were the seat of the Doria's fiefdom on the island called Castel Doria or Castelgenovese. It was conquered by the Aragonese in the 15th century (1448) and renamed Castillo Aragonés (Castel Aragonese). Except for the Maddalena archipelago, it was the last city on the island to join the Kingdom of Sardinia.

Castelsardo was part of the Savoy's Kingdom of Sardinia, obtained by the will of King Charles Emmanuel III.

== Demographics ==
As of 2026, the population is 5,624, of which 50.1% are male, and 49.9% are female. Minors make up 11.4% of the population, and seniors make up 29.5%.

Historical population

Year	Pop.	±%
1861	1,711	—
1871	1,661	−2.9%
1881	1,749	+5.3%
1901	2,006	+14.7%
1911	2,409	+20.1%
1921	2,662	+10.5%
1931	2,931	+10.1%
1936	3,283	+12.0%

Year	Pop.	±%
1951	4,175	+27.2%
1961	4,181	+0.1%
1971	4,380	+4.8%
1981	5,081	+16.0%
1991	5,236	+3.1%
2001	5,410	+3.3%
2011	5,737	+6.0%
2021	5,711	−0.5%

Source: ISTAT

=== Immigration ===
As of 2025, immigrants make up 5.6% of the population. The 5 largest foreign countries of birth are Germany, Romania, France, Ukraine, and Poland.

== Main sights ==
- Elephant's Rock, one of the symbols of Sardinia. You can enter Elephant's Rock without any authorization, and the entry is free.
- Megalithic walls, from pre-Nuragic times
- Nuraghe Paddaju and others
- Doria Castle (1102), the height of the castle is 114 meters.
- Co-Cathedral, dedicated to St. Antony the Abbot. The crypts house the Museum "Maestro di Castelsardo";
- Church of St. Mary, with a wooden Black Christ
- Doria Palace
- La Loggia Palace, town hall since 1111
- The Palace of Eleonora of Arborea, a very famous person in Sardinia.
- Sea walls

== Honors ==
- City title, issued by the crown of Aragon
- One of the: I borghi più belli d'Italia (the most beautiful villages of Italy), Les Plus Beaux Villages de la Terre (the most beautiful villages on earth), Città regie della Sardegna (Royal Cities of Sardinia).
