= Porto Torres Lighthouse =

Porto Torres
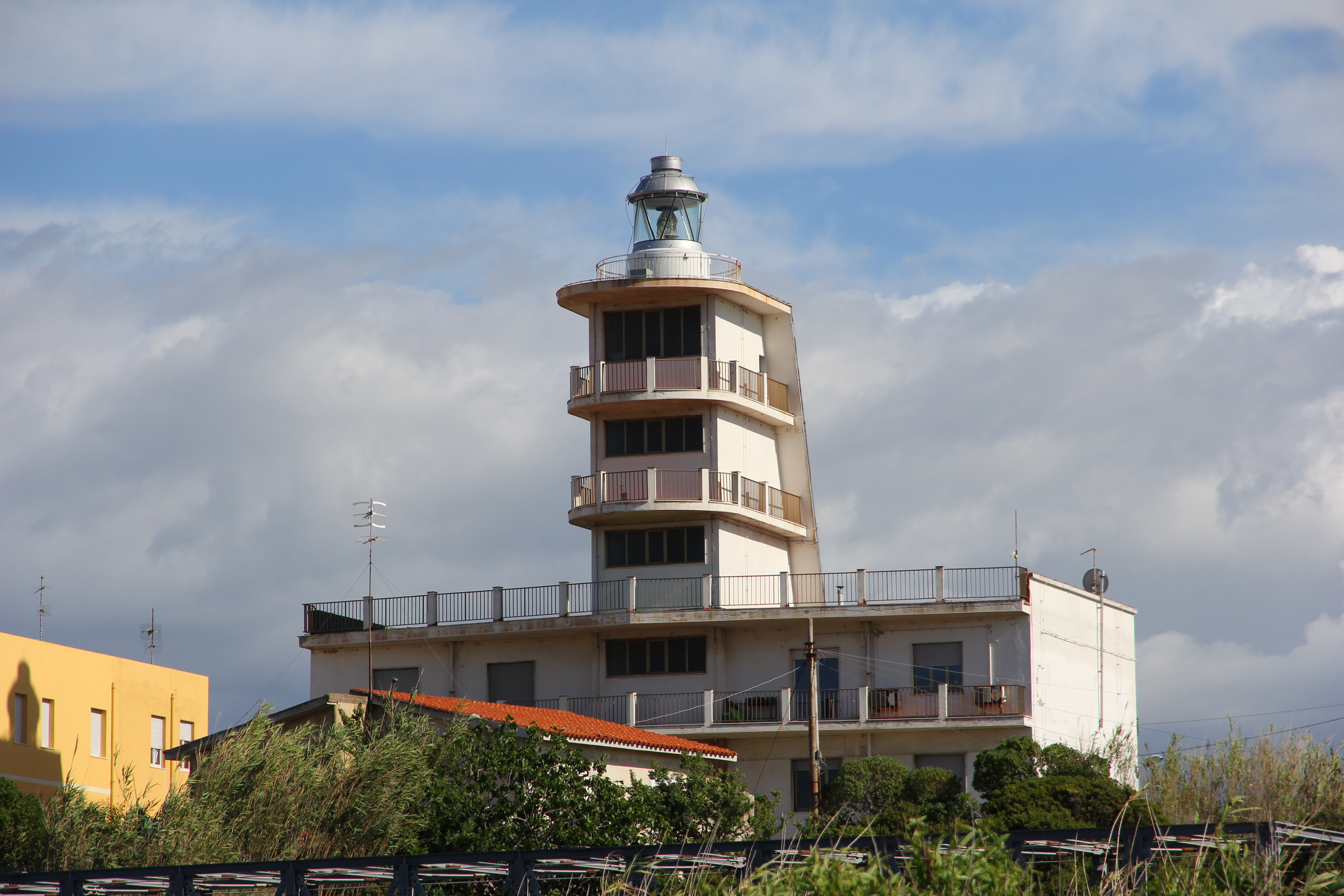
- Porto Torres Lighthouse
- Location: Porto Torres; Sardinia; Italy
- Coordinates: 40°50′10″N 8°23′50″E

Tower
- Constructed: 1855 (first)
- Foundation: masonry base
- Construction: masonry turret
- Height: 20 metres (66 ft)
- Shape: quadrangular turret with three balconies and lantern atop a 2-storey keeper's house
- Markings: white turret, balcony and lantern; grey metallic lantern dome
- Power source: mains electricity
- Operator: Marina Militare
- Fog signal: no

Light
- First lit: 1966 (current)
- Deactivated: 1966 (first)
- Focal height: 45 metres (148 ft)
- Lens: Type OF
- Intensity: main: AL 1000 W reserve: LABI 100 W
- Range: main: 16 nautical miles (30 km; 18 mi) reserve: 12 nautical miles (22 km; 14 mi)
- Characteristic: L Fl (2) W 10s.
- Italy no.: 1437 E.F.

Porto Torres Lighthouse (Italian: Faro di Porto Torres) is an active lighthouse located on Monte Agellu dominating the harbour of Porto Torres in the Gulf of Asinara on the Sea of Sardinia.

== History ==
The first lighthouse (40°50′22.2″N 8°24′05.5″E) was established in 1855 with a light on a massive octagonal prism tower, 20 metres (66 ft) high, built in 1325 by the will of the Aragonese Admiral Carroz who conquered the region in that period. It had the role of observation and protection of the town placed, at the time, on Monte Agellu.

== Description ==
The current is an unusual lighthouse that consists of a masonry square prism turret, 20 metres (66 ft) high, with three semicircular balconies and lantern on the top, rising from a 2-storey keeper's house. The turret and the lantern are painted white, the lantern dome in grey metallic. The light is positioned at 45 metres (148 ft) above sea level and emits two long white flashes in a 10 seconds period visible up to a distance of 16 nautical miles (30 km; 18 mi). The lighthouse is completely automated and managed by the Marina Militare with the identification code number 1437 E.F.

== See also ==
- List of lighthouses in Italy
