= AC Porto Torres =

Italian association football club

Porto Torres
- Full name: Associazione Calcio Porto Torres
- Founded: 1960
- Ground: Cittadella dello sport, Porto Torres, Italy
- Capacity: 3000
- Chairman: Ivan Cermelli
- Head coach: Tore Porqueddu
- League: Promozione Sardegna, Division 2
- 2021-22: 15th
- Website: https://www.facebook.com/Porto-Torres-calcio-541830672636896/
Home colours	Away colours

Associazione Calcio Porto Torres (commonly referred as A.C. Porto Torres, Porto Torres or Porto Torres calcio) is an Italian association football club located in Porto Torres, Sardinia. The club currently plays regional football in the second division of Sardinia's Promozione, the 6th tier of Italian football. His home ground is the town's municipal stadium located in the "Cittadella dello sport" area (the same area is also known as "Stadio comunale", "Campo sportivo comunale" or "Nuovo stadio"). The A.C. Porto Torres is the main football club of the town.

A.C. Porto Torres must not be confused with A.S.D. Torres, another football association located in the town of Sassari.

== History ==
The club was founded in 1960 in Porto Torres, a small town in the Gulf of Asinara. The club competed in the Serie D from 2010 to 2014.

In 2010 the has celebrated his 50th anniversary.

== Colors and badge ==
Its colors are red and blue.

== Notable former players ==
- Michele Fini
- Alessandro Frau
- Salvatore Pinna
- Nicolò Trenta
- Gianfranco Sanna
