= Michele Fini =

Italian footballer (born 1974)

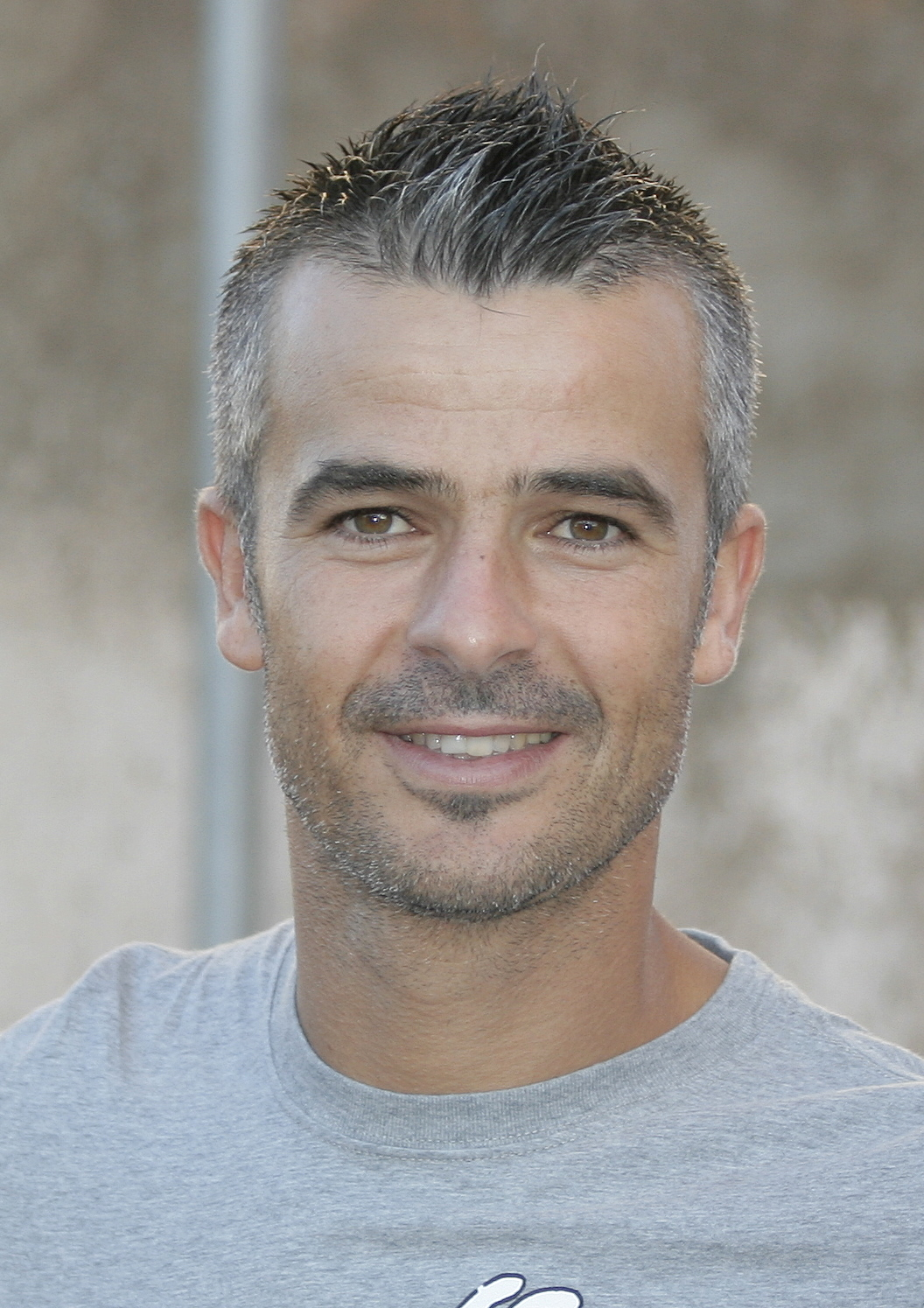
- Fini in 2010

Personal information
- Date of birth: 14 June 1974 (age 52)
- Place of birth: Sorso, Italy
- Height: 1.85 m (6 ft 1 in)
- Position: Midfielder

Youth career
- 1992–1993: Sorso

Senior career*
Years	Team	Apps	(Gls)
1993–1995	Torres	31	(5)
1995–1997	Ancona	52	(2)
1998–2000	Salernitana	10	(0)
1999	→ Cosenza (loan)	6	(0)
2000	Fermana	3	(0)
2000–2001	Avellino	28	(2)
2001–2004	Catania	97	(8)
2004–2007	Ascoli	107	(6)
2007–2009	Cagliari	66	(6)
2009–2011	Siena	17	(1)
2011–2013	Porto Torres	23	(0)
Total		440	(30)

Managerial career
- 2014–2015: Bologna (assistant)
- 2017: Palermo (technical staff)
- 2017: Cagliari (assistant)
- 2018–2019: Peñarol (assistant)
- 2020: Brescia (assistant)
- 2020: Brescia (assistant)
- 2020–: Sassari Latte Dolce (Manager)
- * Club domestic league appearances and goals

Michele Fini (born 14 June 1974) is an Italian football coach and former player.

== Playing career ==
Fini was born in Sorso, Province of Sassari. A midfielder, started his career at Sardinian clubs. In summer 1995 he was signed by Ancona. In January 1998 he was signed by Salernitana of Serie B. Fini's debut in Serie A and last match for Salernitana was on 26 September 1998 in a match against Udinese the score was 2–0.

He was transferred to Cagliari from Ascoli Calcio 1898 in 2007, signed a two-year deal. He scored six goals in sixty six appearances in his time at the club. On 9 July 2009, A.C. Siena signed the midfielder from Cagliari Calcio on a two-year deal. After his spell at Siena, Fini returned to his home province of Sassari and spent the remainder of his career playing for Serie D side A.C. Porto Torres. He formally retired in July 2014 at the age of 40 to take up the assistant manager position at Bologna F.C.

== Managerial career ==
On 3 July 2014, Bologna manager Luis Diego López appointed Fini as the club's assistant manager. Fini departed the club the following year after López's removal.

In January 2017 he was appointed as a member of Palermo's technical staff, a position which he left in October of that year to rejoin López as assistant manager, this time at his former club Cagliari. Fini followed López, with whom he moved to López homeland, Uruguay, in early June 2018, joining Peñarol. Starting from five points behind arch-rivals Club Nacional de Football, they led the club to a league title by beating that adversary 1–0 in the final. After losing by the same margin to Nacional in the next edition, López announced his exit in December 2019 together with his staff, including Fini.

On 5 February 2020, Fini and López returned to Serie A, signing with second-from-bottom Brescia Calcio after the dismissal of Eugenio Corini. López and Fini was fired on 20 August 2020. However, they were hired again on 6 October 2020. Two months later, the duo was fired for the second time.

== Honours ==
Salernitana

- Serie B: 1997–98

Ascoli

- Serie B promotion to Serie A: 2004–05

Catania

- Serie C1 promotion Serie B playoff: 2001–02

Peñarol

- Uruguayan Championship Championship: 2018

Individual

- Serie A top assist provider: 2008–09 (13 assists)

== Sources ==
- gazzetta.it
- Michele Fini at TuttoCalciatori.net (in Italian)
