= Salvatore Pinna =

Italian footballer

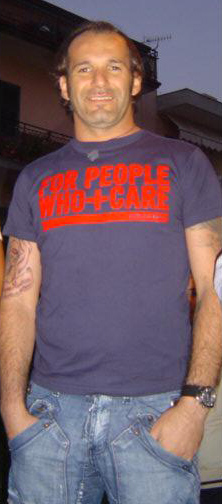

Personal information
- Date of birth: 23 August 1975 (age 51)
- Place of birth: Sorso, Italy
- Height: 1.77 m (5 ft 10 in)
- Position: Goalkeeper

Team information
- Current team: Torres (technical coach)

Youth career
- 1993–1994: Sorso

Senior career*
Years	Team	Apps	(Gls)
1994–1998	Castelsardo	131	(0)
1998–2006	Torres	196	(0)
2006–2007	Grosseto	16	(0)
2006–2007	Taranto	17	(0)
2007–2009	Salernitana	58	(0)
2009–2011	Pescara	72	(0)
2012–2013	Porto Torres	3	(0)
2013–2014	Alghero		
2016	Tempio		
2016–2020	Torres	28	(0)

Managerial career
- 2016–2020: Torres (GK coach)
- 2021–: Torres (technical coach)
- * Club domestic league appearances and goals

Salvatore Pinna (born 23 August 1975) is an Italian football coach and a former goalkeeper who works as a technical coach with Torres.
