= Antiquarium Turritano =

- Antiquarium Turritano
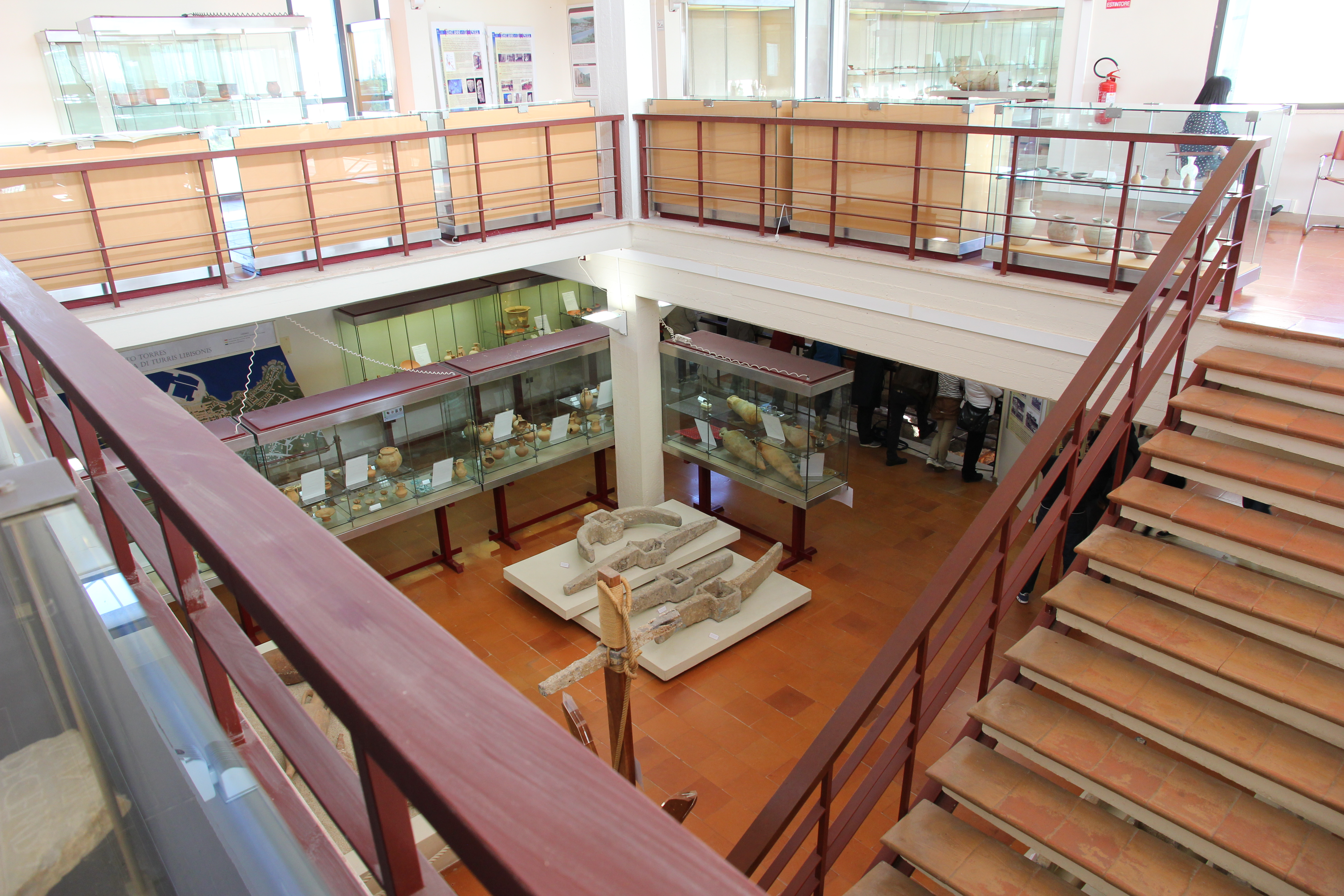
- Location: Porto Torres, Sardinia, Italy
- Coordinates: 40°50′18″N 8°23′49″E
- Type: museum

The Antiquarium Turritano is an archaeological museum in Porto Torres, Sardinia, Italy. The museum was inaugurated in 1984, and since 2014 has been managed by the Italian Ministry of Culture.

The exhibition is divided into two parts: one is dedicated to statuary and underwater material the other to materials from the necropolis unearthed in the urban area. The first part includes baths, the marble items put together by Emilio Paglietti in the late 19th and early 20th century.

== Some holdings ==
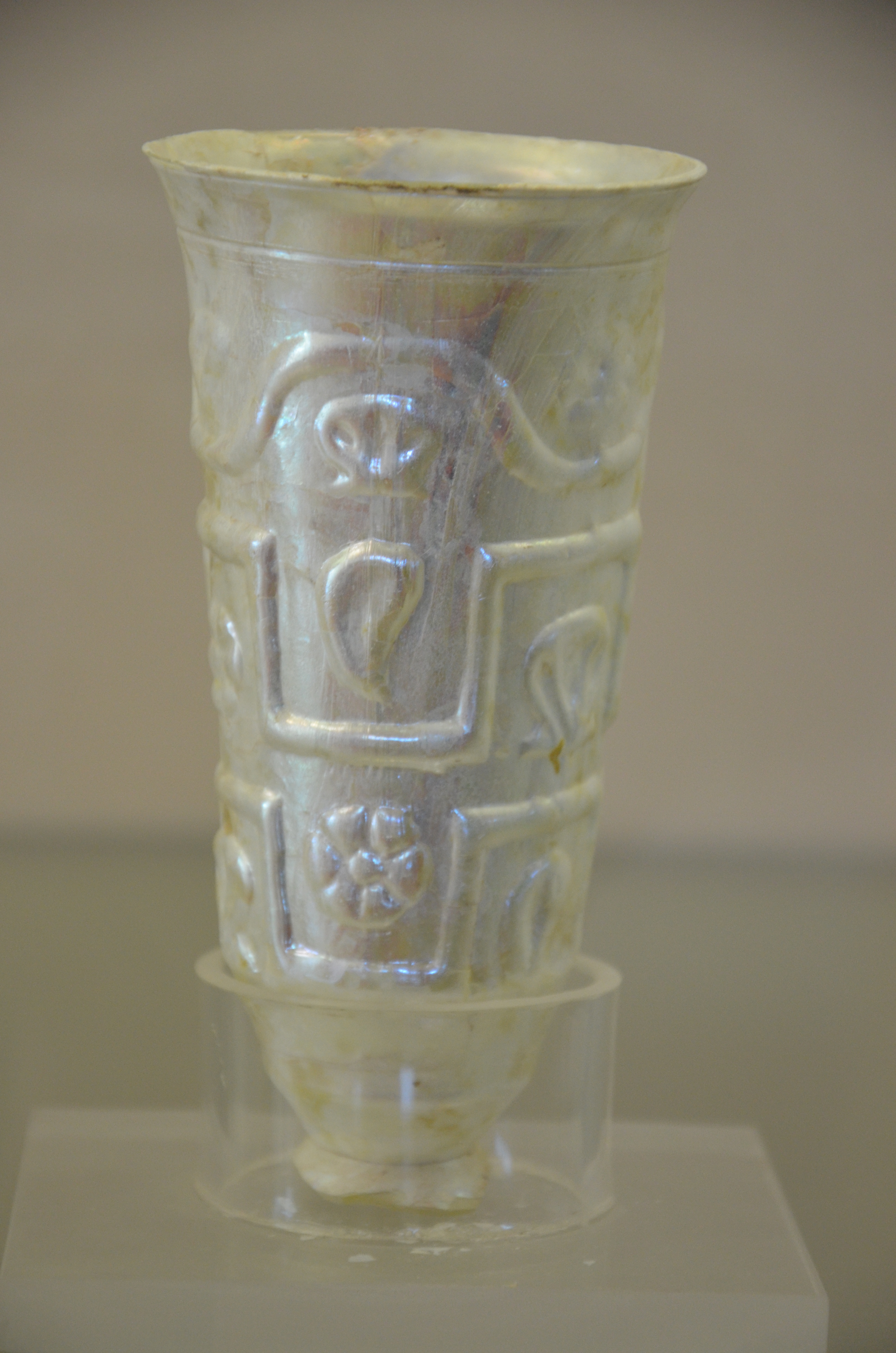
Roman container

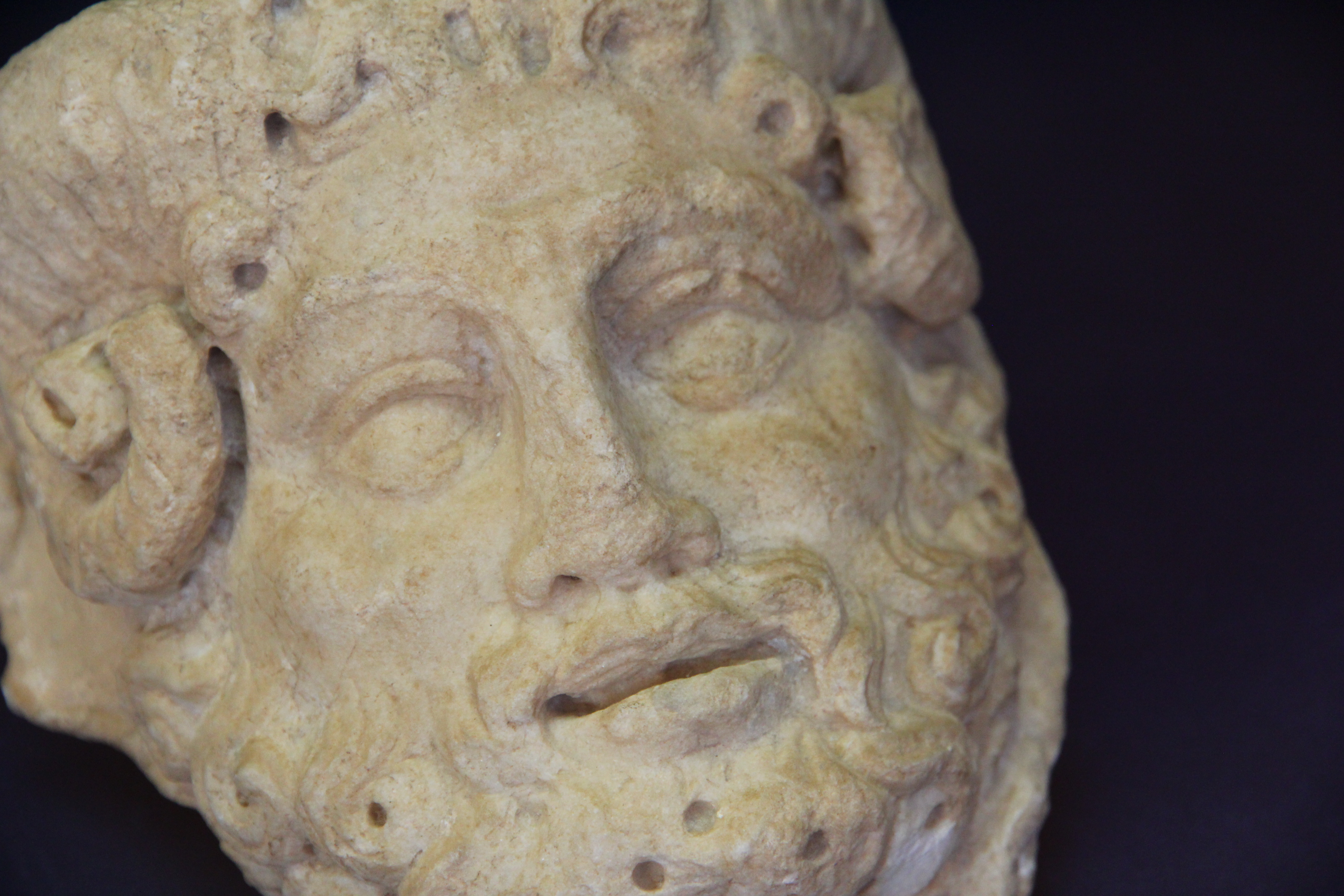
Roman sculpture

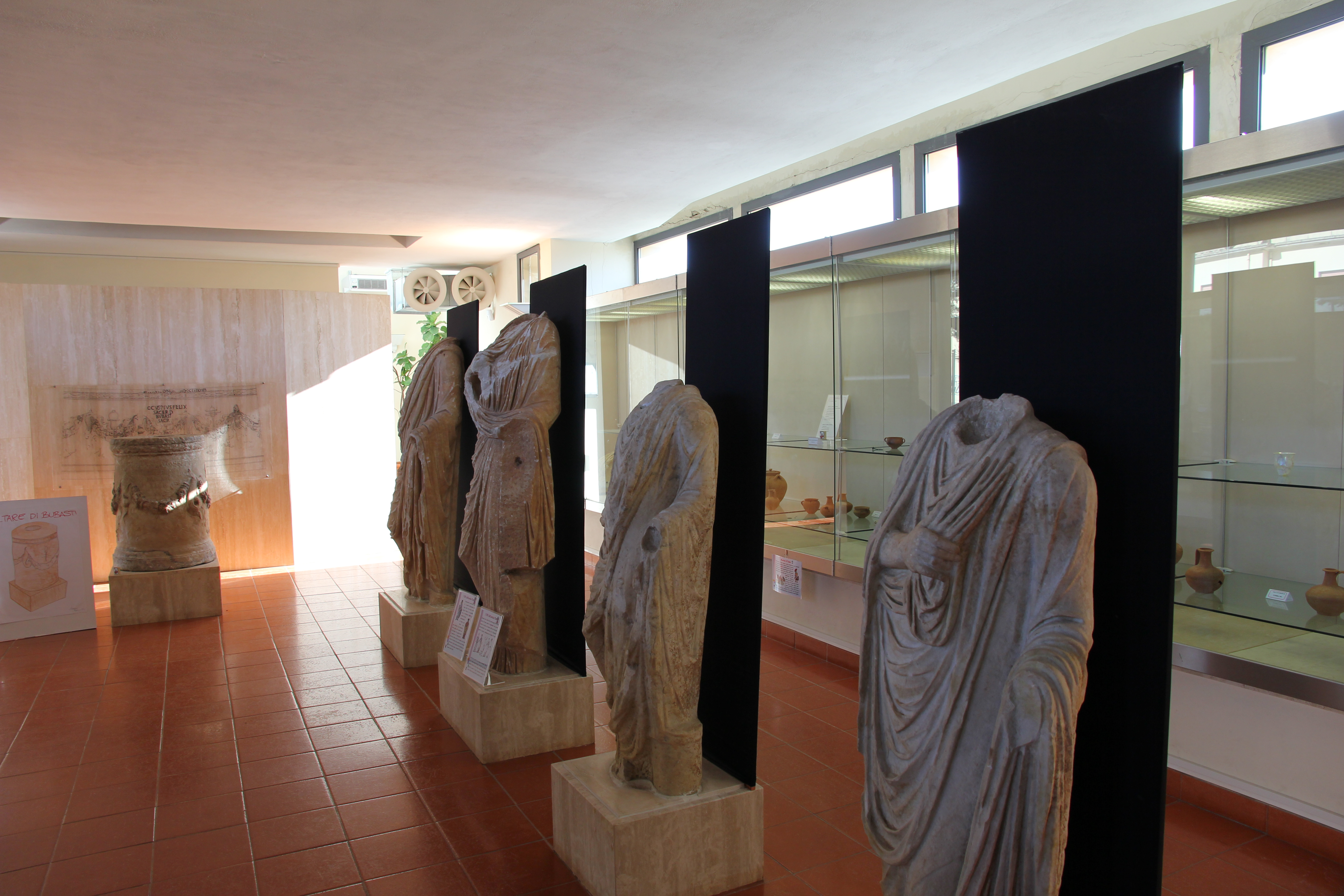
Roman statues

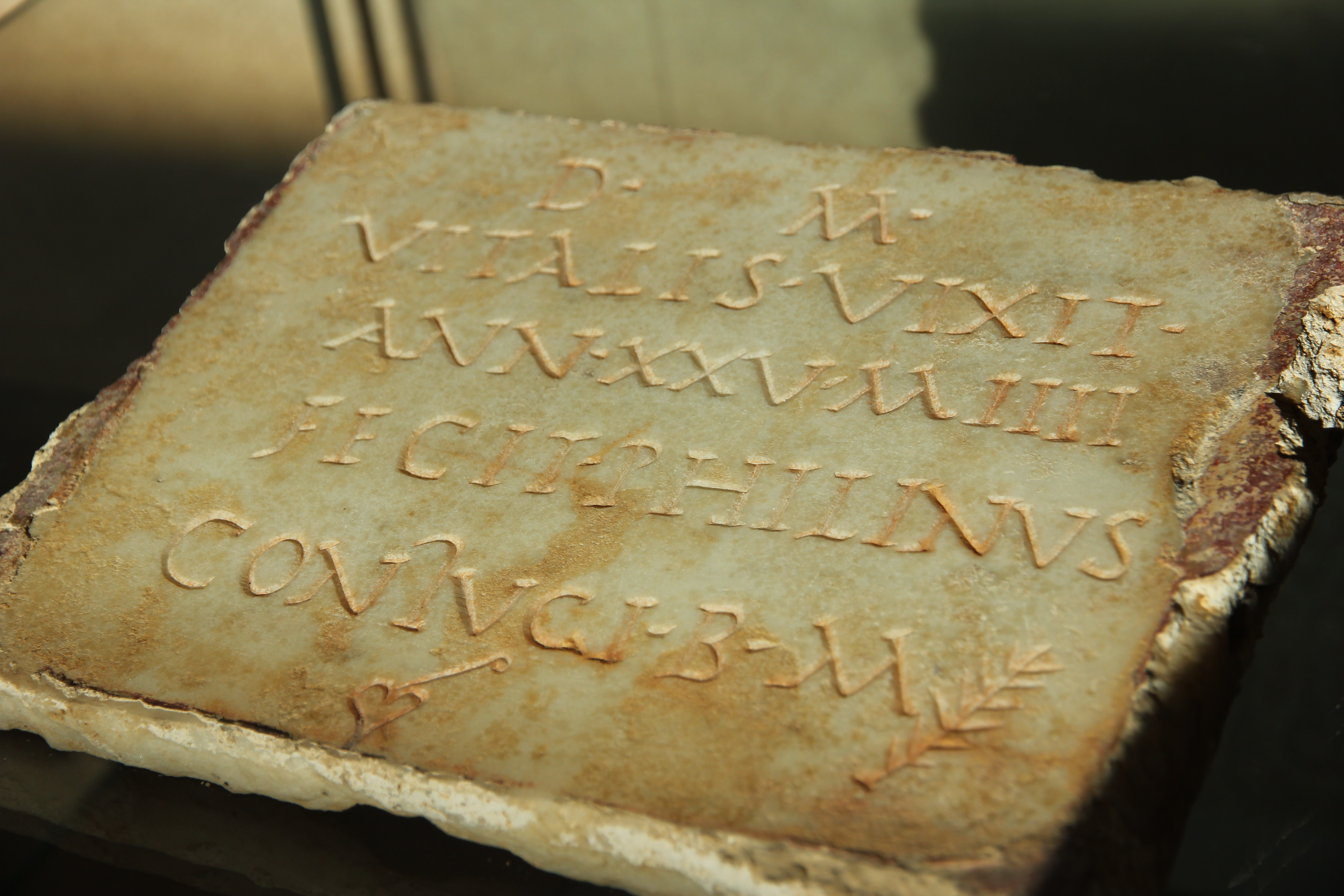
A Roman inscription

== Sources ==
- "Antiquarium Turritano, dopo due anni e mezzo riapre il museo" L'Unione Sarda, 12 July 2021
- Touring club Italy
