= Platamona =

Platamona Prattamona
- Frazione of Sassari
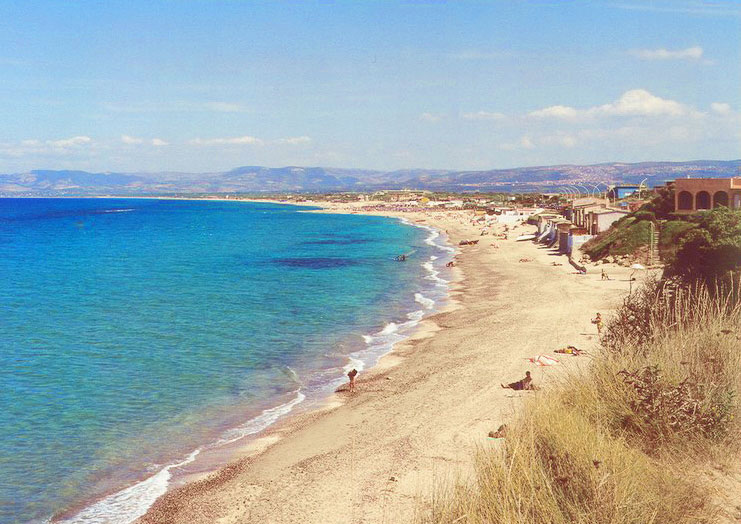
- The Beach of Platamona

- Location within Italy
- Coordinates: 40°49′8.13″N 8°27′52.70″E
- Country: Italy
- Region: Sardinia
- County: Municipality of Sassari
- City: Sassari

Population
  - Total: 21

Platamona (Sassarese: "Pratamona or Prattamona") is a coastal area in northern Sardinia, Italy, located along the Gulf of Asinara, in the municipality of Sassari, between the commune of Sorso and Porto Torres.

The name Platamona comes from the Greek platamon-onos, meaning flat surface.

It is composed of a beach of white sand and shells, surrounded by a wood of maritime pines and juniper trees, and a retro-dunal lagoon.

The coast is a Site of Community Importance (SCI) and the lagoon is a protected oasis.

The tourist development of the place began after 1950, when malaria was no longer a concern. Today the beach is the principal tourist seaside location in the municipality of Sassari. there are hotels, restaurants, campings, bed & breakfasts, supermarkets and resorts, and one airfield with a flying school. There is an Emergency Medical Service ambulatory, a thalassotherapy treatment centre and a waterpark (located in Marina di Sorso).
