= Porto Torres =

Porto Torres Portu Turre (Sardinian) Posthudòrra (Sassarese)
- Comune
- Città di Porto Torres
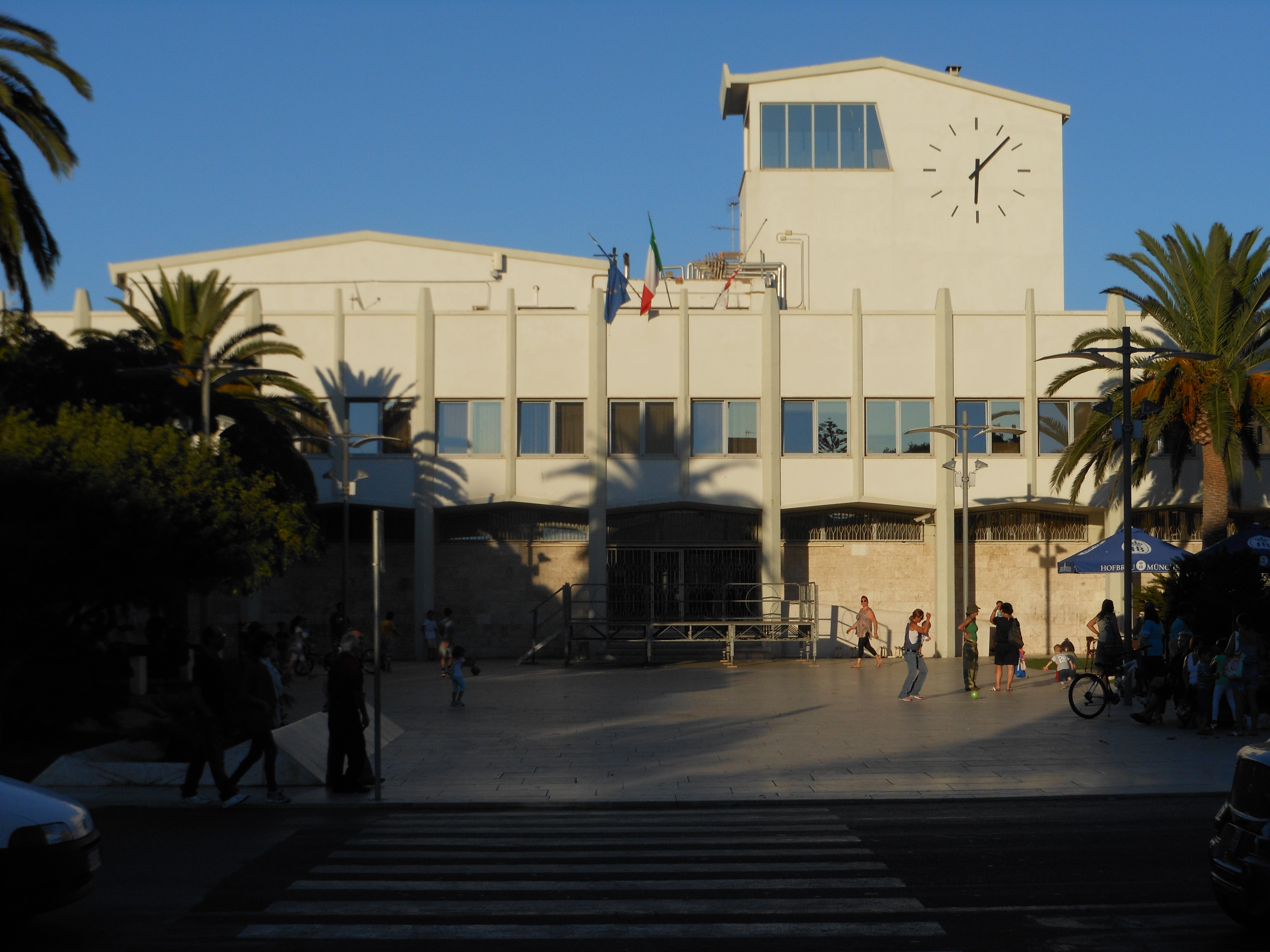
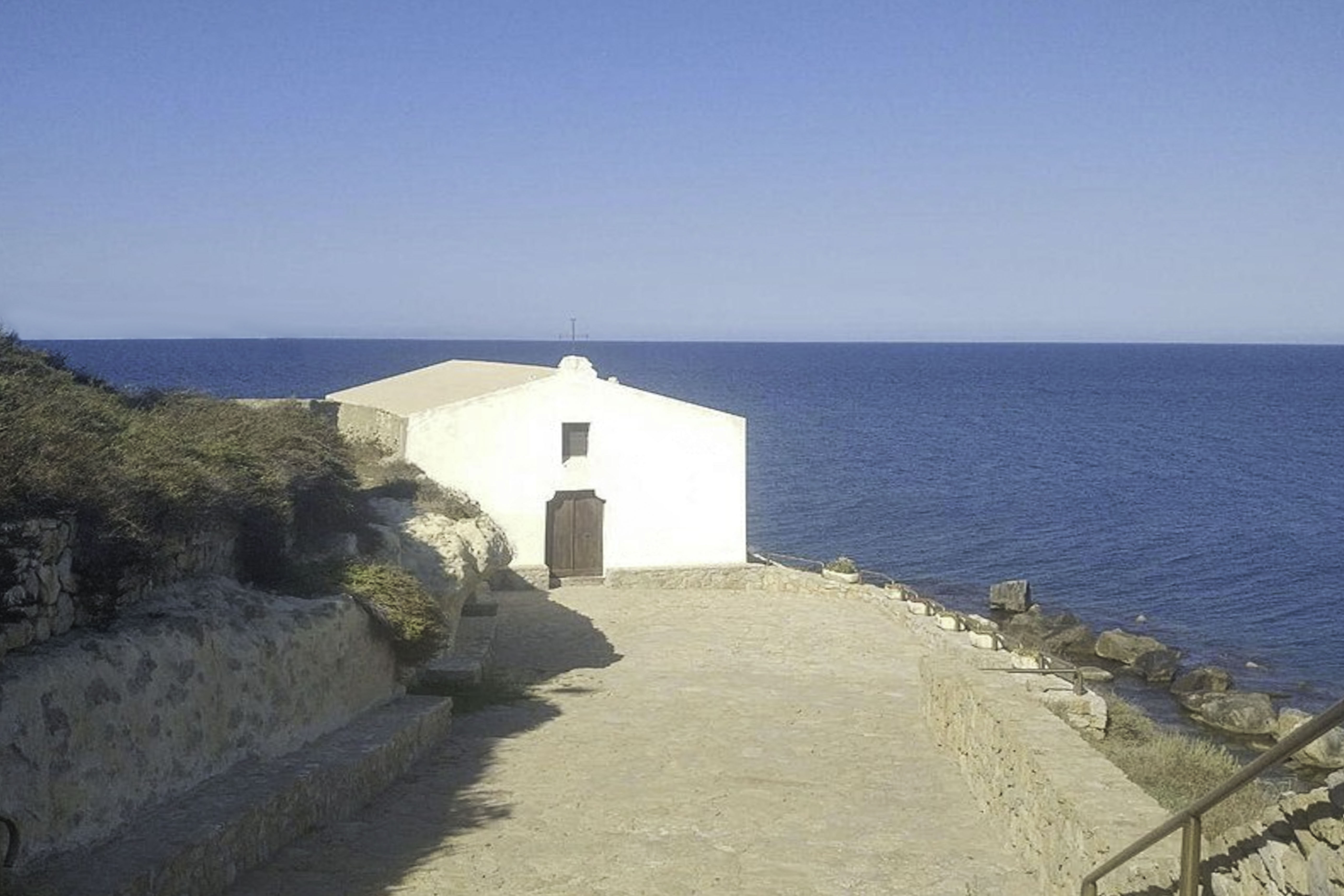
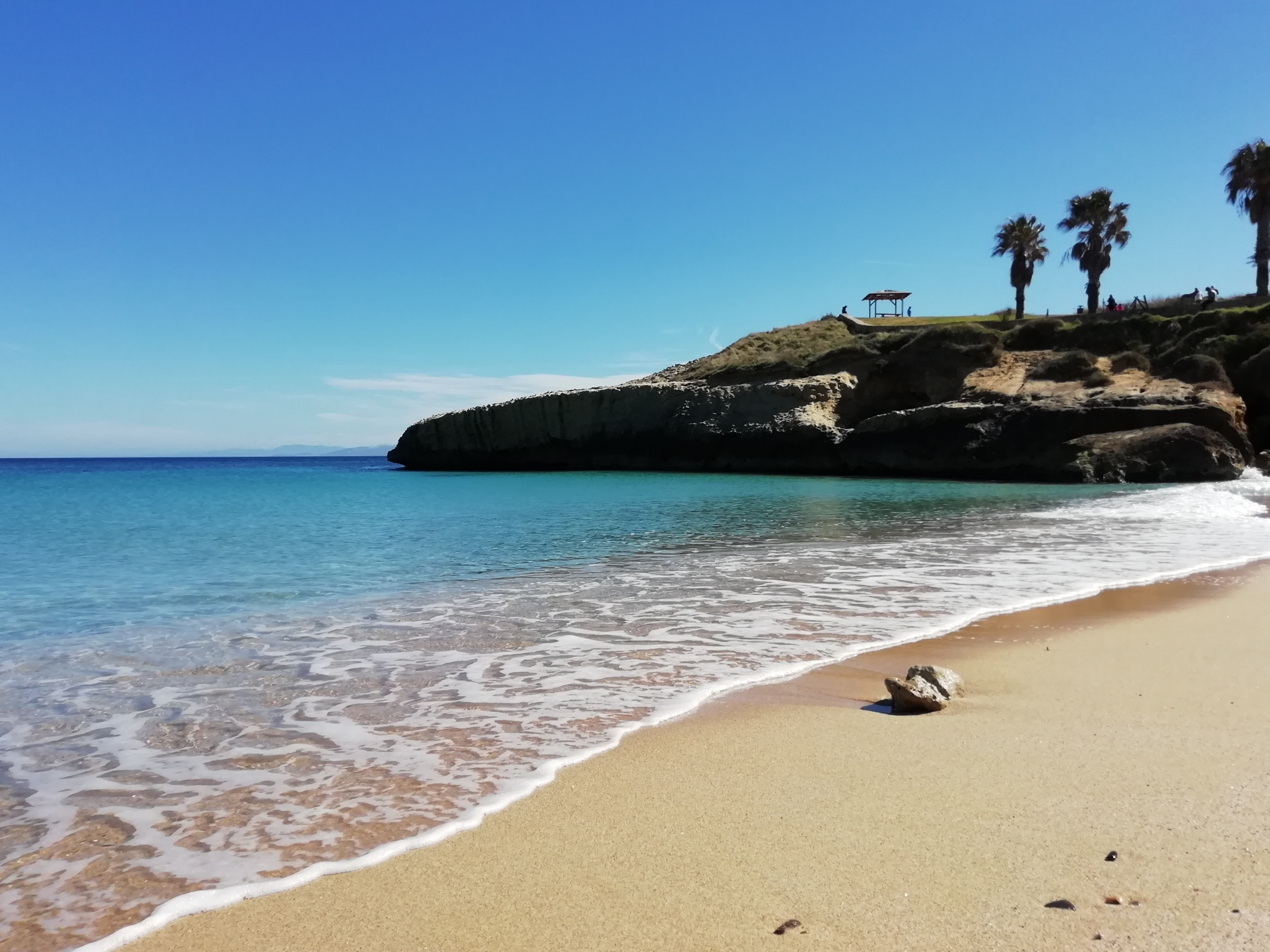
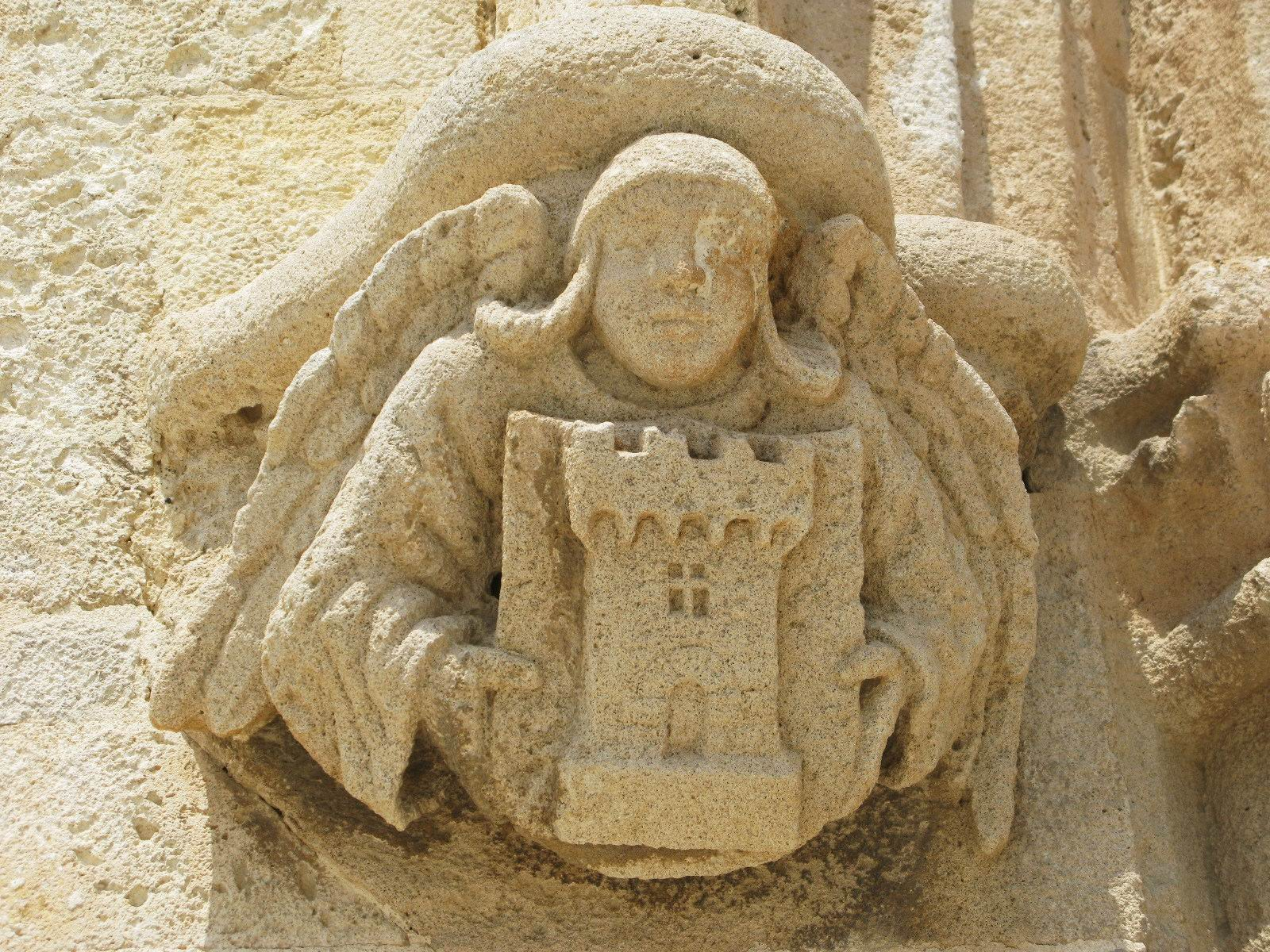
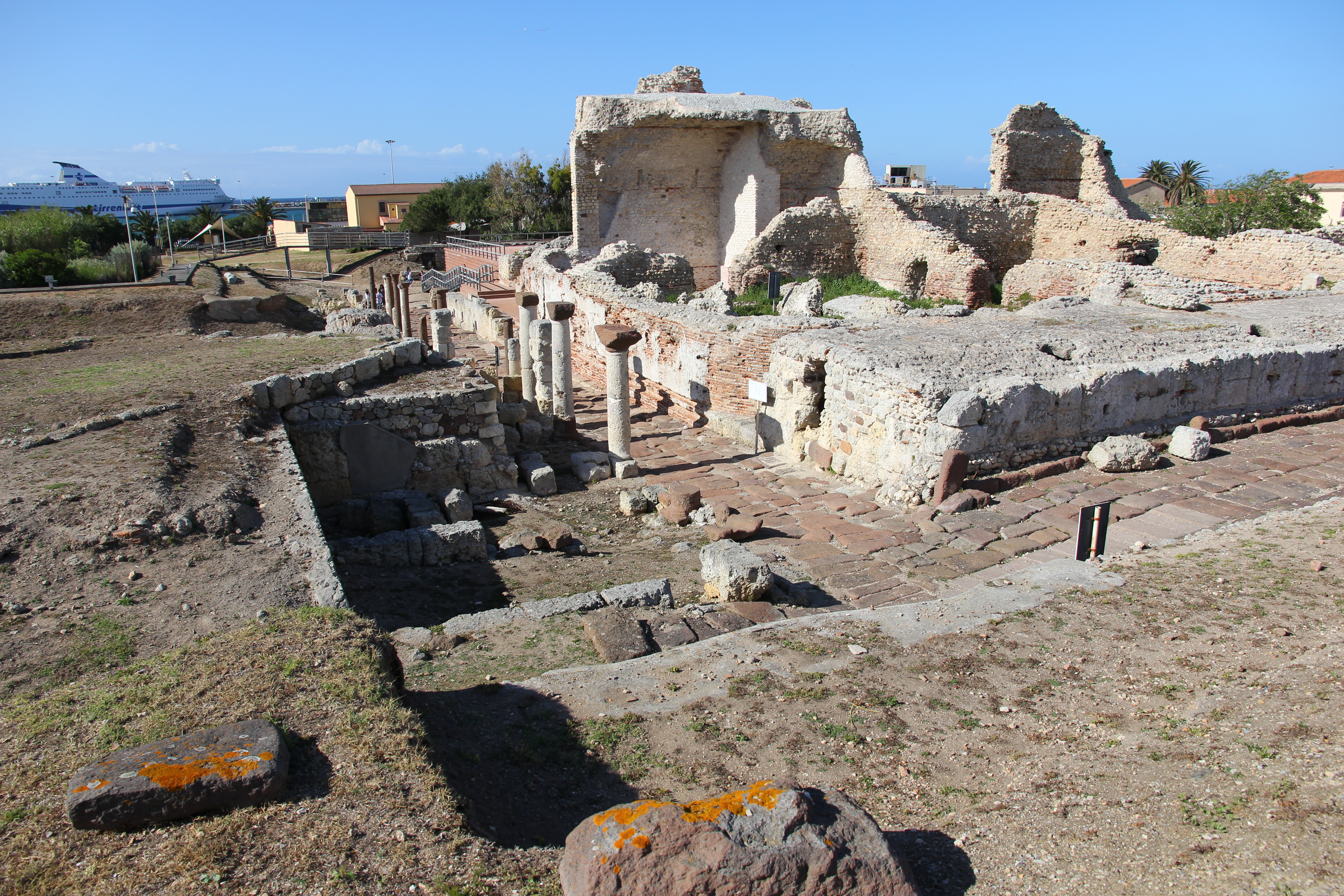
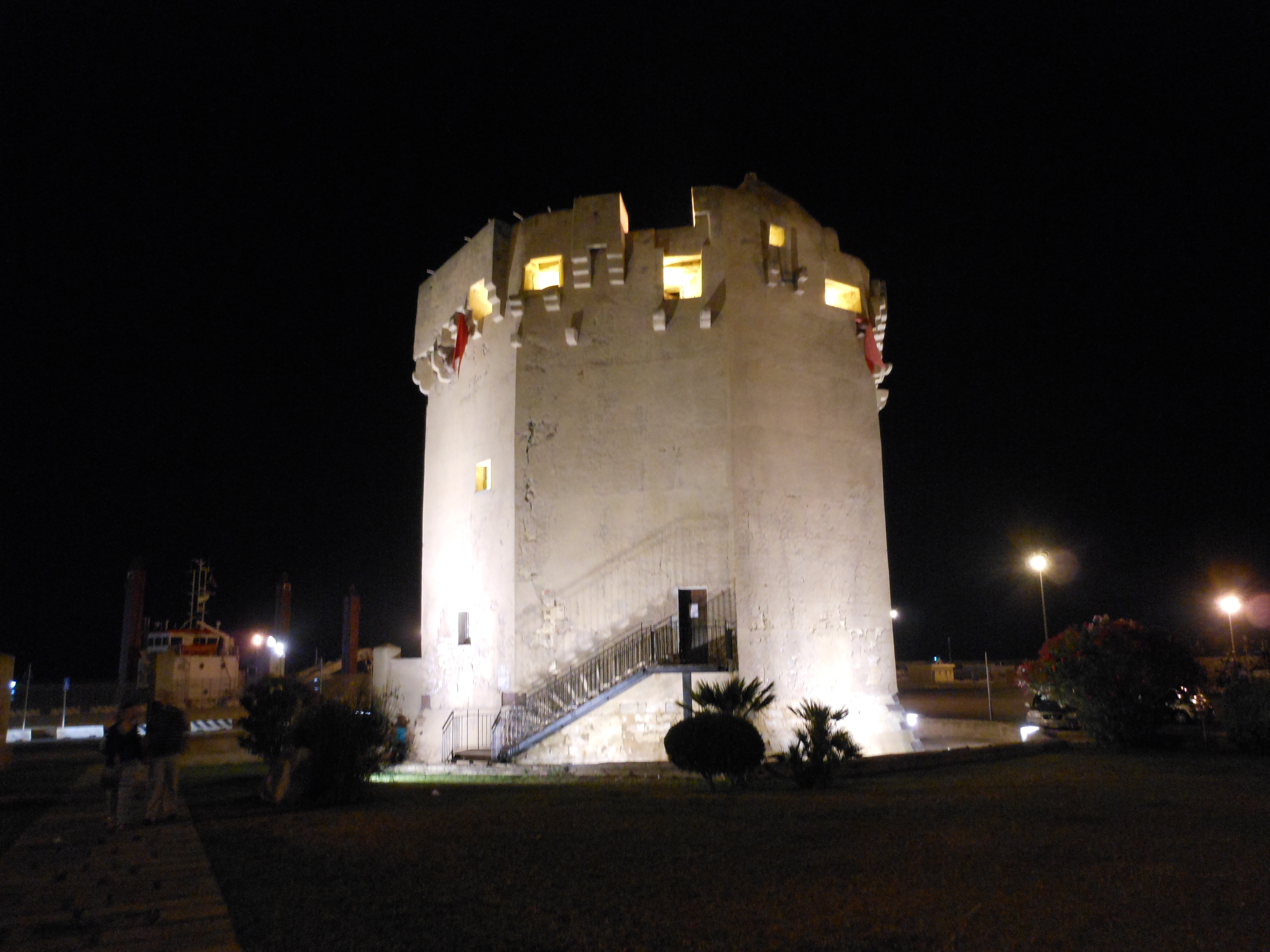
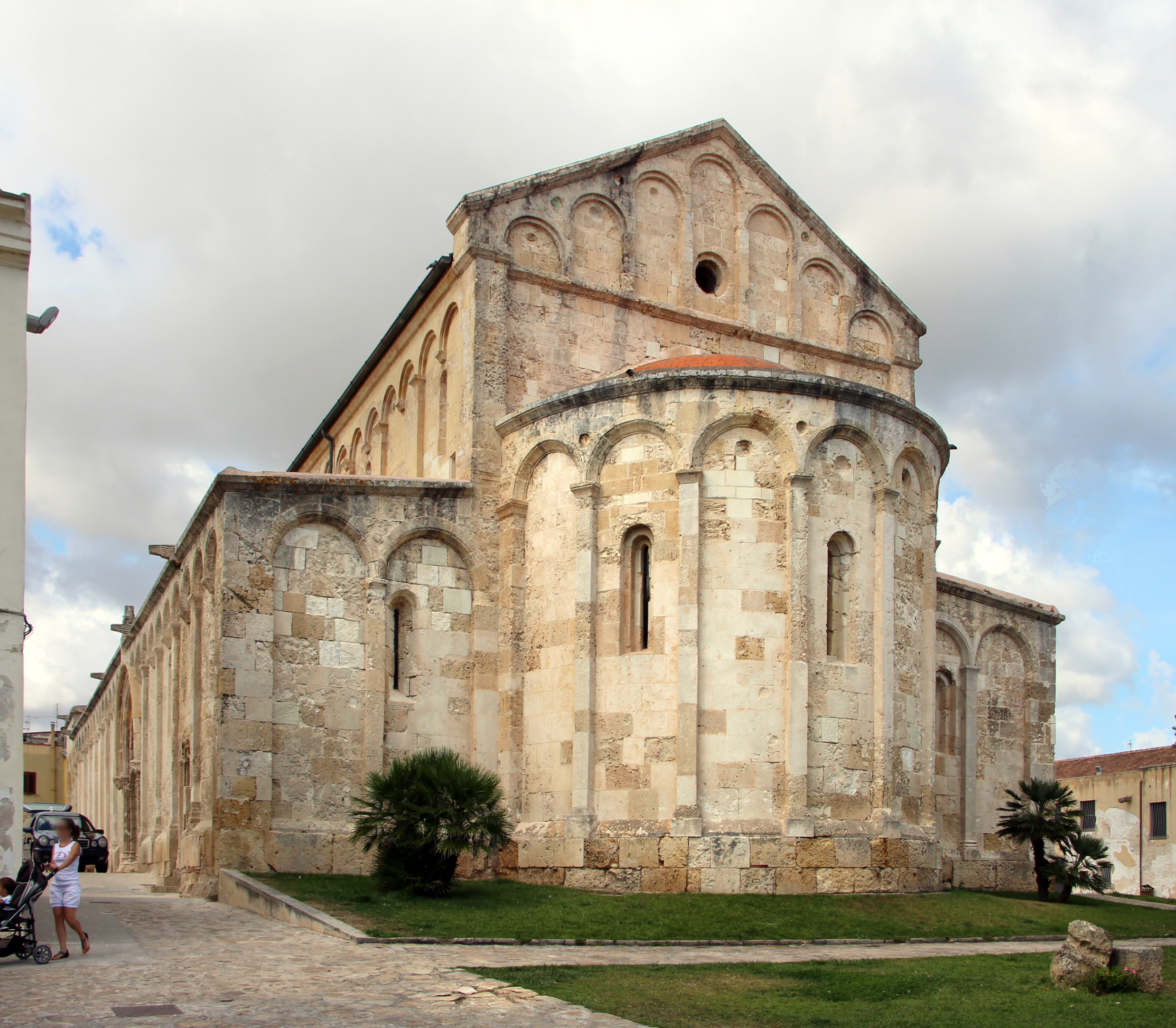
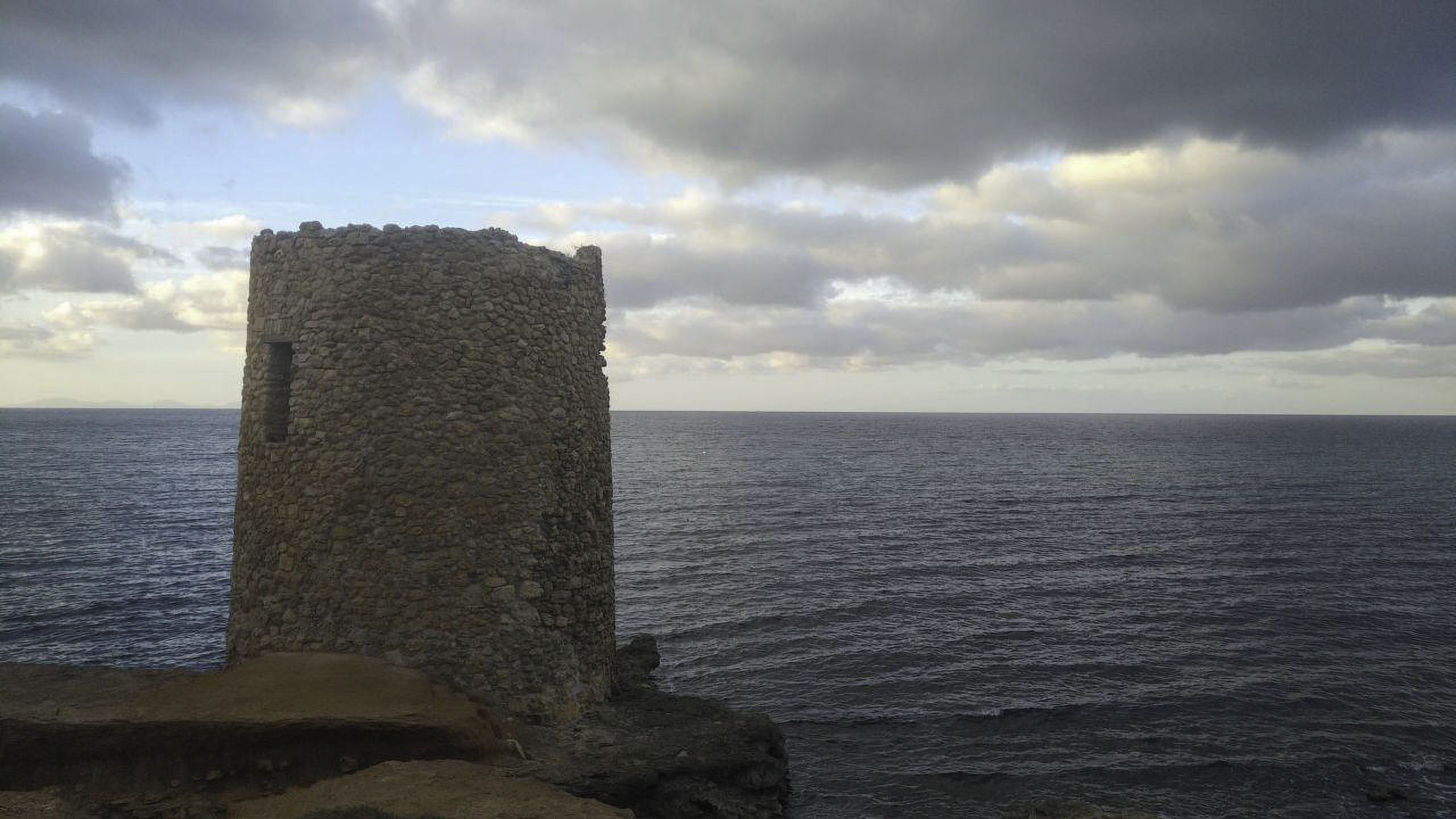
- Clockwise from top: Town hall of Porto Torres, Coat of arms of the Judicate of Logudoro, Torre del Porto, Torre di Abbacurrente, Basilica of San Gavino, Domus de Orfeo, Church of San Gavino a Mare, Balai beach

- Coat of arms

- The territory of the comune (in red) inside the Metropolitan City of Sassari

- Location within Sardinia
- Coordinates: 40°50′N 8°24′E
- Country: Italy
- Region: Sardinia
- Metropolitan city: Sassari (SS)
- Founded: 46 b.C (Roman settlement); 11 June 1842 (comune)
- Frazioni: Li Lioni, Asinara, Fiume Santo, Platamona

Government
  - Mayor: Massimo Mulas

Area
  - Total: 104.41 km^{2} (40.31 sq mi)
- Elevation: 17.00 m (55.77 ft)

Population (2026)
  - Total: 20,624
  - Density: 197.53/km^{2} (511.60/sq mi)
- Demonym(s): Turritani, Bainzini or Portotorresi
- Time zone: UTC+1 (CET)
  - Summer (DST): UTC+2 (CEST)
- Postal code: 07046
- Dialing code: 079
- ISTAT code: 090058
- Patron saint: St. Gavinus, St. Proto, St. Gianuario
- Saint day: 30 May
- Website: Official website

Porto Torres (Sardinian: Portu Turre, Sassarese: Posthudorra) is a town and comune (municipality) in the Metropolitan City of Sassari in the north-west of the autonomous island region of Sardinia in Italy. It is situated on the coast at about 25 kilometres (16 mi) east of Falcone Cape and in the center of the Gulf of Asinara. With a population of 20,624, it is the 14th-largest municipality in Sardinia.

Founded during the 1st century BC as Colonia Iulia Turris Libisonis, it was the first Roman colony of the entire island.

The port of Porto Torres is the second biggest seaport of the island, followed by the port of Olbia. The town is very close to the main city of Sassari, where the local university takes office.

== Etymology ==
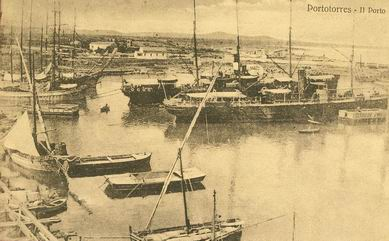
Postcard of Porto Torres of the early 20th century. The name is written Portotorres

Historically the settlement was founded with the Latin name "Colonia Iulia Turris Libisonis", composed with Colonia (name of the Roman settlements) Iulia (name of the Julia gens) Turris (litt. "tower", referred probably to a nuraghe built not so far from the town or to the Monte d'Accoddi) and Libisonis (referred to Libya, probably because in the same area there was a Phoenician trading outpost. "Libya" is the ancient name of the entire northern coast of Africa). After the fall of the Western Roman Empire the town was known simply as "Turris". During the Middle Ages during the Judicate of Logudoro the name was corrupted with "Torres" and after, during the Aragonese period, the town was known simply with the Catalan name of "Lo Port" (The port). During the Savoy reign it was known with the name of Portotorre (Porto+Torre; "Towerport").

Until the 1960s the town was commonly known as "Portotorres", and only after the official recognition of the status of city the name has officially changed in Porto Torres.

== History ==
=== Prehistorian and Nuragic period ===
==== The Miocene ====
In the frazione of Fiume Santo in 1994 have been found a lot of animal fossils presumably dated at the Miocene. Some 8/9 million years old rests of Oreopithecus bambolii has been find in the same area. The discovering has started casually thanks to some hobbyist paleontologists that have noticed after some maintenance works in the near thermal power station the presence of some fossils in the excavation debris. In the area has been individuated 15 vertebrate species like giraffes, crocodiles, turtles, suidae and Mustelidae. Most of these animals like the Umbrotherium azzarolii were herbivorous, but some others like the Indarctos anthracitis were omnivores.

==== Prehistory ====
Ancient human presence in the municipal territory of Porto Torres is certified thanks to many necropolises in the area. The altar of Monte d'Accoddi (very near to the town but in the municipality of Sassari) witness the human presence in that area during these ages.

==== Bronze and Nuragic Age ====
Finds dated at these ages have been found in the Necropolis of Su Crucifissu Mannu. In this necropolis have two skulls were found with the presence of some sort of surgical procedure probably practiced to heal issues like migraines and tumors. Another theory is that this surgical procedure was practiced for religious and/or magical purposes. Many nuraghes belong to these ages, and nowadays only 7 of these structures are in a well preserved state. The Domus de Janas of Andreolu also witness the presence of the Nuragic civilization.

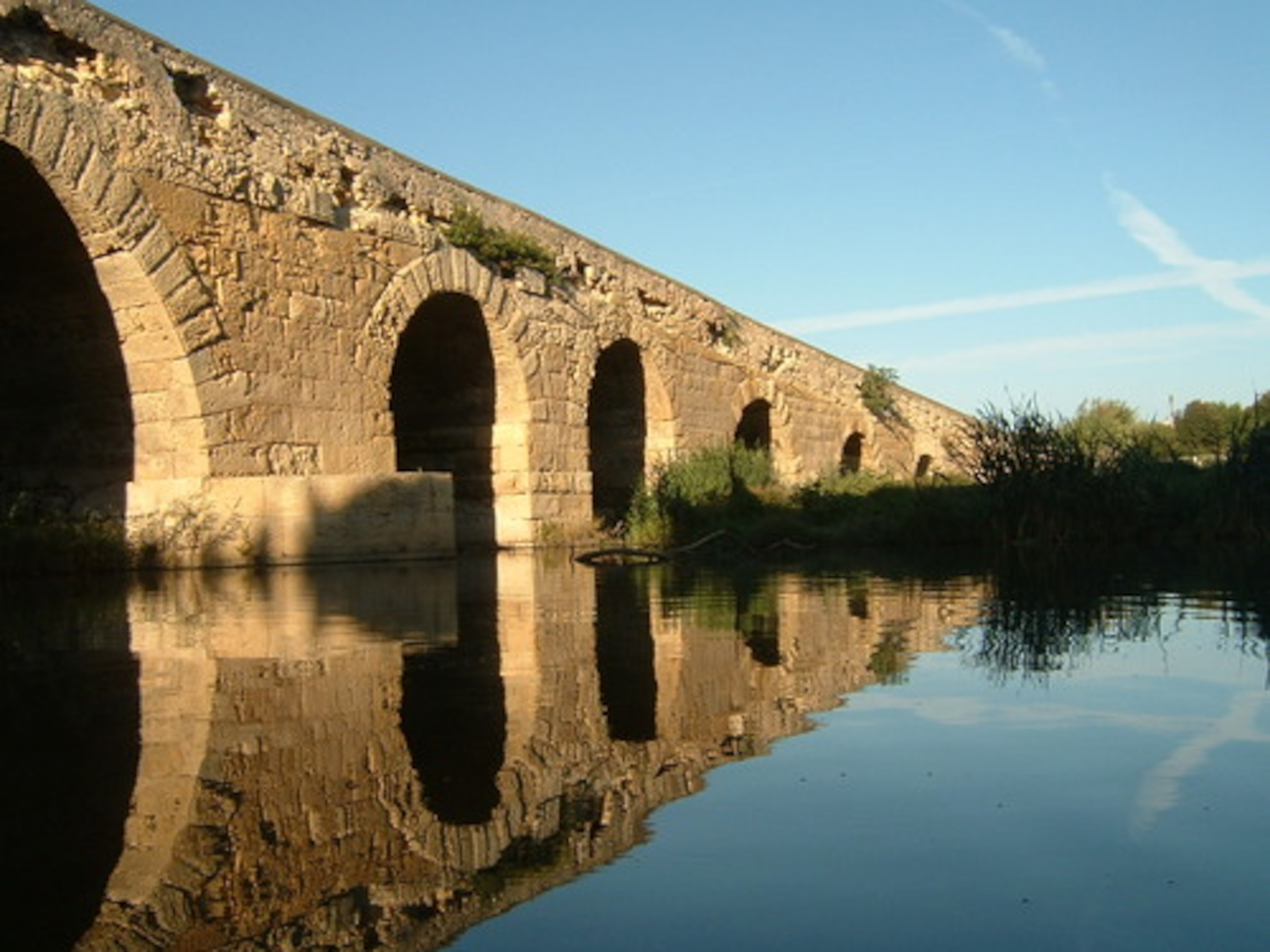
The Roman bridge of Porto Torres

=== Roman period (46 BC – 455 AD) ===
In ancient times, Turris Libisonis was one of the most considerable cities in Sardinia. It was probably of purely Roman origin, founded apparently by Julius Caesar, as it bore the title Colonia Julia. Pliny described it as a colony, the only on the island in his time, suggesting that there was previously no town on the spot, but merely a fort or castellum. It is noticed also by Ptolemy and in the Itineraries, but without any indication that it was a place of any importance. The ancient remains still existing prove that it must have been a considerable town under the Roman Empire. According to inscriptions on ancient milestones, the principal road through the island ran directly from Caralis (Cagliari) to Turris, a sufficient proof that the latter was a place much frequented. Indeed, two roads, which diverged at Othoca (modern Santa Giusta) connected Caralis to Turris, the more important keeping inland and the other following the west coast. It was also an episcopal see during the early part of the Middle Ages. There exists also the remains of a temple (which, as we learn from an inscription, was dedicated to Fortune, and restored in the reign of Philip between 247 and 249), of thermae, of a basilica and an aqueduct, as well as a bridge over the adjoining small river, still called the Fiume Turritano.

=== After the Western Roman Empire ===
The ancient city continued to be inhabited until the 11th century, when most of the population migrated to Sassari, about 15 kilometres (9 mi) inland, and on a hill. It was partly under Genoese hands until the early 15th century, when it was conquered by the Aragonese. After a period of Spanish rule, it became part of the Kingdom of Sardinia.

Torres was separated from the Commune of Sassari in 1842. At the time, the area which had been built around the basilica of Saint Gavino joined the fishermen's community near the port to form the new Porto Torres. On 10 May 1942, Benito Mussolini visited the town. On Palm Sunday, 18 April 1943, the city was bombed by the Allies.

== Geography ==
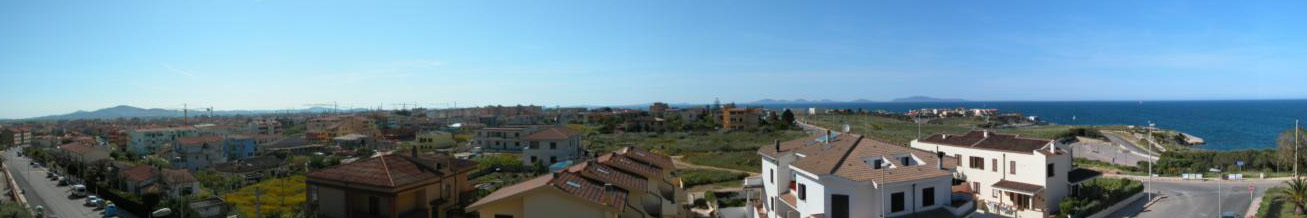
Panorama near Parco Baden-Powell

Porto Torres is on the north-west coast of Sardinia.

The area of the municipality is almost 10,200 hectares and is subdivided into two parts, almost equal in size. One part includes the city, the industrial area, and the Roman ruins; the other consists of two islands, Asinara and the smaller Isola Piana. Since 1997, this part of the municipality is the Asinara National Park.

The morphology of "city part" is flat; the area of Porto Torres and the rest of north-west Sardinia is characterized by a Nurra plain, with some hill formations in the middle of it. Part of this hill formation is in the municipality of Porto Torres, the highest elevation being Monte Alvaro, rising to a height of 342 m above sea level.

The communal territory is crossed by two rivers, Rio Mannu and Fiume Santo. The first flows along the edge of Porto Torres to the west, while the second runs near the city and was used as a navigable river as early as the days of ancient Rome.

=== Climate ===
Climate data for Porto Torres (1981–2010)
Month	Jan	Feb	Mar	Apr	May	Jun	Jul	Aug	Sep	Oct	Nov	Dec	Year
Mean daily maximum °C (°F)	13.6 (56.5)	14.0 (57.2)	16.2 (61.2)	18.5 (65.3)	23.1 (73.6)	27.2 (81.0)	30.3 (86.5)	30.8 (87.4)	26.8 (80.2)	22.8 (73.0)	17.7 (63.9)	14.2 (57.6)	21.3 (70.3)
Daily mean °C (°F)	9.4 (48.9)	9.5 (49.1)	11.5 (52.7)	13.5 (56.3)	17.6 (63.7)	21.6 (70.9)	24.5 (76.1)	25.2 (77.4)	21.7 (71.1)	18.0 (64.4)	13.6 (56.5)	10.5 (50.9)	16.4 (61.5)
Mean daily minimum °C (°F)	5.1 (41.2)	5.0 (41.0)	6.7 (44.1)	8.4 (47.1)	12.0 (53.6)	16.0 (60.8)	18.7 (65.7)	19.5 (67.1)	16.5 (61.7)	13.2 (55.8)	9.5 (49.1)	6.7 (44.1)	11.4 (52.5)
Average precipitation mm (inches)	44.5 (1.75)	37.3 (1.47)	41.8 (1.65)	47.6 (1.87)	33.3 (1.31)	13.6 (0.54)	3.3 (0.13)	9.8 (0.39)	42.6 (1.68)	82.9 (3.26)	89.4 (3.52)	65.9 (2.59)	511.9 (20.15)
Source: Sistema nazionale protezione ambiente

== Demographics ==
Historical population
Year	Pop.	±%
1861	2,025	—
1871	2,248	+11.0%
1881	3,228	+43.6%
1901	4,225	+30.9%
1911	5,154	+22.0%
1921	5,792	+12.4%
1931	7,116	+22.9%
1936	7,311	+2.7%
1951	9,118	+24.7%
1961	11,199	+22.8%
1971	16,230	+44.9%
1981	20,990	+29.3%
1991	21,264	+1.3%
2001	21,064	−0.9%
2011	22,391	+6.3%
2021	21,330	−4.7%
Source: ISTAT

As of 2026, the population is 20,624, of which 48.9% are males, and 51.1% are females. Minors make up 13.0% of the population, and seniors make up 27.0%.

Until the 1960s, the town was considered to be more or less like a large village. After that, thanks to industrialization, the population increased rapidly until the 1980s, when the local petrochemical industry managed by the "SIR – Società Italiana Resine" owned by Angelo Rovelli entered into a deep financial crisis.

=== Immigration ===
As of 2025, immigrants make up 2.7% of the population. The 5 largest foreign countries of birth are France, Poland, Romania, Senegal, and Germany.

Foreign-born population (2025)
Country of birth	Population
France	58
Poland	49
Romania	46
Senegal	31
Germany	29
Switzerland	21
United Kingdom	21
Nigeria	19
China	16
Spain	15
Hungary	13
Brazil	12
Russia	12
Ukraine	12
Belgium	11

== Administration ==
In charge	Name	Political alliance	Role	Notes
20 July 1988; 24 June 1990	Rodolfo Cermelli	Christian Democracy	Mayor	
27 July 1990; 28 June 1993	Giacomo Rum	Italian Socialist Party	Mayor	
28 June 1993; 12 May 1997	Alfredo Dessì	PRC, Democratic Party of the Left, PSd'Az	Mayor	
12 May 1997; 28 May 2001	Eugenio Cossu	PRC, Democratic Party of the Left, FdV	Mayor	
28 May 2001; 1 February 2005	Gilda Usai Cermelli	FI, AN, civic list, CCD, CDU	Mayor	
23 May 2005; 15 June 2010	Luciano Mura	Democrats of the Left, PSd'Az, DL, Italian Democratic Socialists, PCI, PRC	Mayor	
15 June 2010; 10 February 2015	Beniamino Luigi Scarpa	Many civic lists, IDV	Mayor	
18 June 2015; 9 November 2020	Sean Christian Wheeler	Five Star Movement	Mayor	
9 November 2020 in charge	Massimo Mulas	Progetto Turritano, PD, Italy in Common	Mayor	

== Sights ==
=== Churches ===
Basilica of St. Gavinus, St. Proto and St. Gianuario (1080)

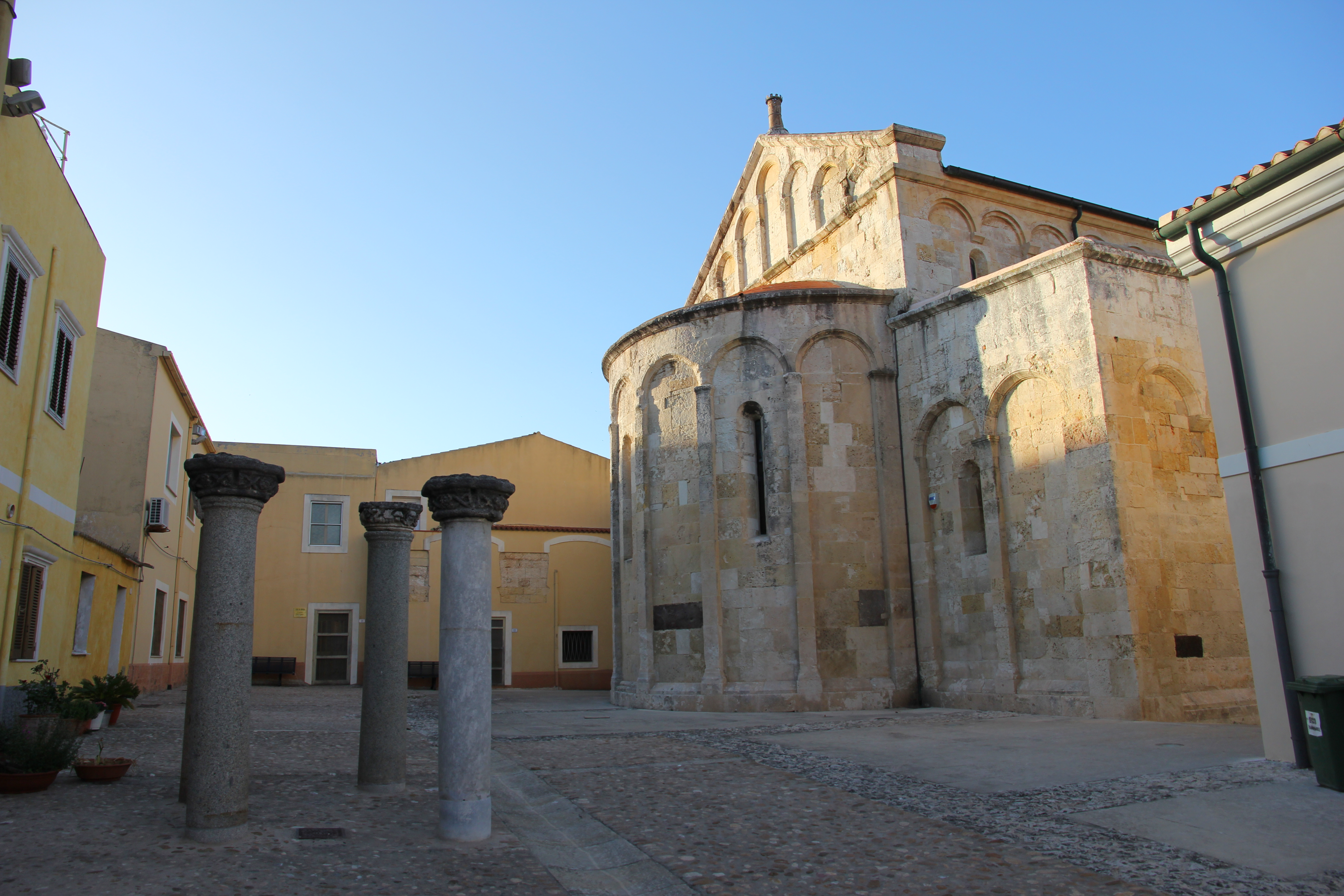
Basilica of St. Gabinus, St. Proto and St. Gianuario

Built using only hardstones like marble, porphyry and granite, is the largest Romanesque church in Sardinia built between 1065 and 1080 above the hill of "Monte Angellu" in one of the historical neighborhood of the town. The basilica was erected in the memory of St. Gavinus, St. Protus and St. Gianuario, beheaded during the 303 a.C under the governance of the emperor Diocletian and Maximian. Instead of the usual western facade and eastern apse, the cathedral sports two apses. The crypt holds several Roman sarcophagi.It was the main cathedral of the Roman Catholic Archdiocese of Sassari until 1441.
Church of Beata Vergine della Consolata (1826)
Neoclassic church built by the architect Giuseppe Cominotti (the same person who also built the Marquess's palace) in 1826. It was the main church of the historical seaport neighborhood, distinguished from the rural neighborhood of "Monte Angellu" situated near the Basilica of St.Gavinus.
Church of San Gavino a Mare (1850)
Also known as "Balai vicino" to distinguish it from the very similar church of Santu Bainzu Ischabizzaddu, it is built near the beach of Balai. In that place St. Gavinus, St. Proto and St. Gianuario has been buried after the execution, inside the building there are the three loculi of the saints.
Church of Santu Bainzu Ischabizzaddu
Also known as "Balai lontano" to distinguish it from the very similar church of San Gavino a Mare, it is built in the place where the three saints has been beheaded. Built with limestone, it seems to be a rebuild of a more ancient building. The name, literally "Church of the beheaded St. Gavinus " is because of, following the folk custom, in that place on 25 October 303 d.C., St. Gavinus was executed and, two days later, Proto and Gianuario did the same epilogue.
Monumental cemetery of Cala D’Oliva
An ancient cemetery in the island of Asinara. The historical cemetery of Cala d'Oliva host the ancestors of the inhabitants of Stintino; the town founded in 1885 by the residents of Cala d'Oliva after the institution of the exile colony in the island of Asinara, which forced them to abandon their homes of their historical settlement.
Austro-Hungarian chapel of St Ephysius and St Gavinus (1915)
Built by the austro-hungarians POW imprisoned in the exile colony of the Asinara in the period between 1915 and 1916. Artistically it was decorated by the hungarian prisoner György Nemess.
Italian cemetery of Campo Faro (1916)
During the WWI the island of Asinara was also a lazaretto for the italian soldiers affected by cholera during the campaign in Albania. In that period took place the history of the bolognese soldiers of the "Brigata Savona" died before they can reach the island during their transport in the hospital ship "Re d'Italia". To distinguish the italian soldiers corpses from the austro-hungarian it was built a cemetery in the area of "Campo faro" and it was called "Italian cemetery".
Austro-Hungarian Ossuary (1936)
An ossuary built in 1936 by the will of the Austrian government to keep the corpses of all the 7048 austro-hungarian unidentified soldiers died during the detention in the penal colony during the WWI because of typhoid fever and cholera.

=== Civil architectures ===
In the Porto Torres's comprehensive planning there are many civil buildings both of private propriety and owned by the comune that are considered historically significant. These buildings witness the urban and the economic development of the city through the centuries until the 1960s; period of the local golden age of the industrial development thanks to the Italian economic miracle. Many of these architectures, especially the industrial ones, are not fully restored and visitable.

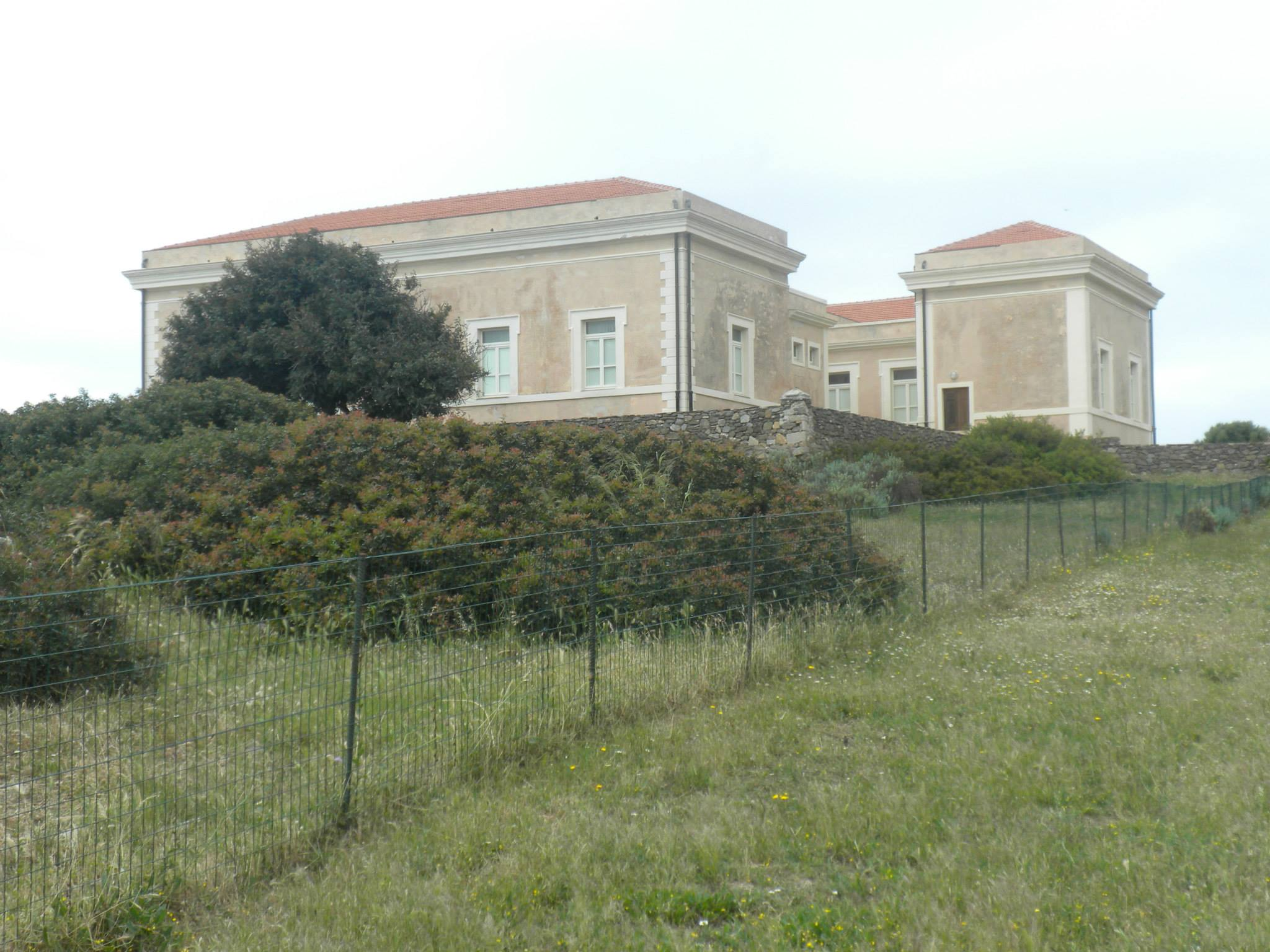
Hospital of Cala Reale viewed by the street

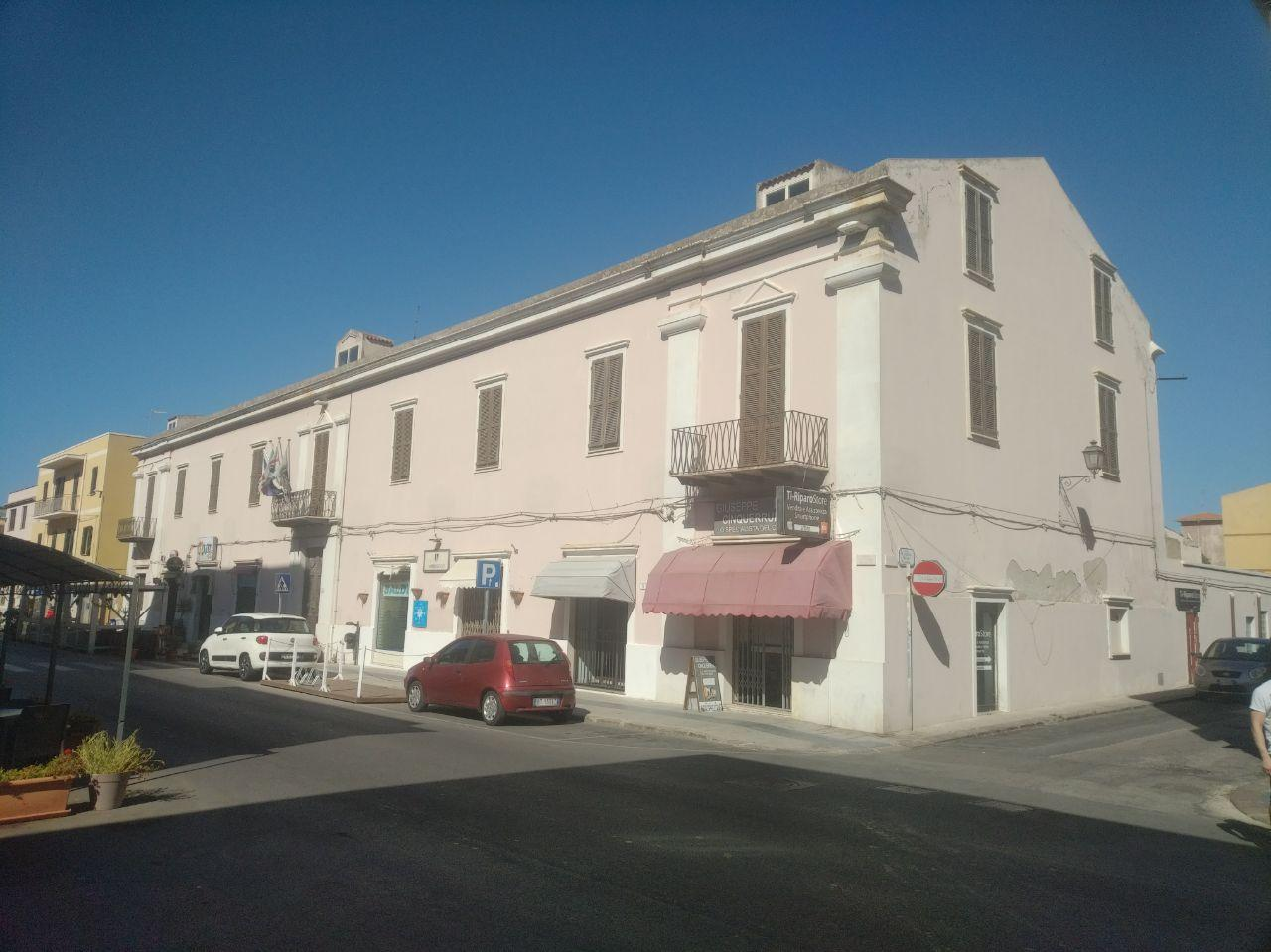
Marquess's palace

- Marquess's palace, neoclassical palace built by Giuseppe Cominotti, the same architect of the not so far church of the "Beata vergine della consolata";
- Seaport museum (1872), an example of the industrial architecture of the 19th century. Originally used as a train station, now it is a museum;
- The Antiquarium Turritano museum.
- Junior school E. De Amicis (1912), An historical full-working school building built by engineer Eugenio Serra. It is a full architectural example of the 19th-century Italian schools;
- Ferromin S.A. industrial complex, built in the early 20th century, it has been the main industrial complex of the town for decades until the liquidation of the "Societá Anonima Ferromin" in the 1960s;
- Porto Torres Marittima station (1872), late 19th-century building, terminal of the "Ozieri-Chilivani-Porto Torres Marittima" railway;
- Industrial complex "Ex-cementeria Alba" (1957), built during the industrial golden age by the engineer Messina, it is a pure example of industrial archaeology;
- Industrial complex "Ex ferriera sarda" (1959), another example of the industrialization of north Sardinia, built by the influent entrepreneurs family of the Salis;
- Agricultural consortium of Via Sassari, An old consortium building that witness the agricultural past of the city. The historical storage buildings known as "I Granai" are now used as a mall;
- Hamlet of Cala d'Oliva, located in the Asinara it is the historical settlement abandoned at the end of the 19th century;
- Lighthouse of Punta Scorno (1854), located in the Asinara, it is an ancient full-working lighthouse, one of the most ancient lighthouses of Sardinia;
- Stoplight station of Punta Scorno;
- Royal Palace of Cala reale, the summer residence of the Savoy during their residence in the Asinara;
- Hospital of Cala Reale;
- Healthcare marittime quarantine station of Cala Reale, building used both as a lazaretto and a storage for the local healthcare.

=== Military architectures ===
Air-raid shelter "ex caserma dei carabinieri" (1943)
During the early WWII all the air-raid shelters in the town was barely used until may 1943, when the city was heavily bombed by the RAF. That air raid bombing, the worst that the city has suffered in the whole war period, was commonly remembered as "Palm Sunday bombing". For a long period of time this air raid shelter was left abandoned and in a heavy state of decay (same thing was for the air raid shelter "scuole de Amicis"), only recently has been restored and opened to the public.
Air-raid shelter "scuole De Amicis"
Situated under the 1900s junior school E. de Amicis: like many others air-raid shelters of the town, it was used during the world war II in order to protect the civilians from the several air-raids of the time. In the present days it is used as an exposition gallery.
Artillery outpost of the Roman bridge n° SR414 (1873)

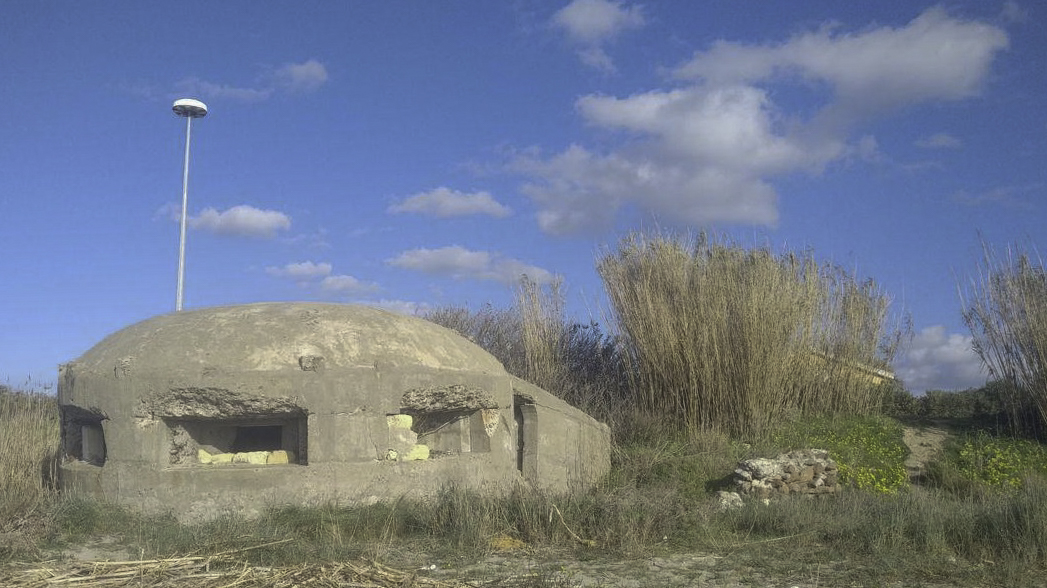
Casemate situated in the beach of the Marinella between the town and the industrial zone

An outpost used until the second world war composed with several military installations
Castle of the Asinara
Also known as the "Castellaccio" it is an ancient medieval castle in the island of the Asinara. In the present days it is used as a fire protection outpost by the Asinara national park administration.
Spanish towers (1323–1720)
- Aragonese tower (1325)
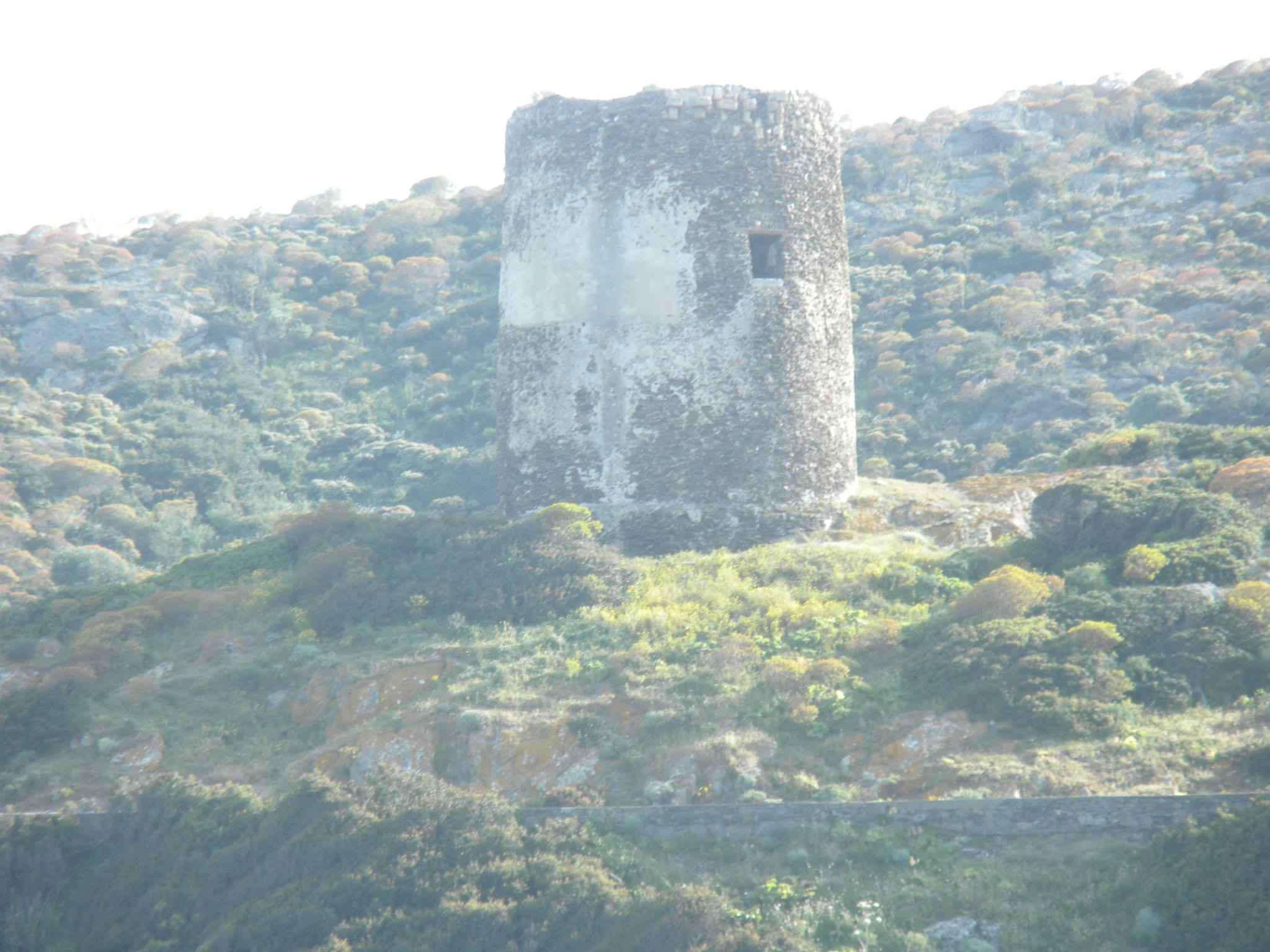
  Tower of Cala d'Oliva
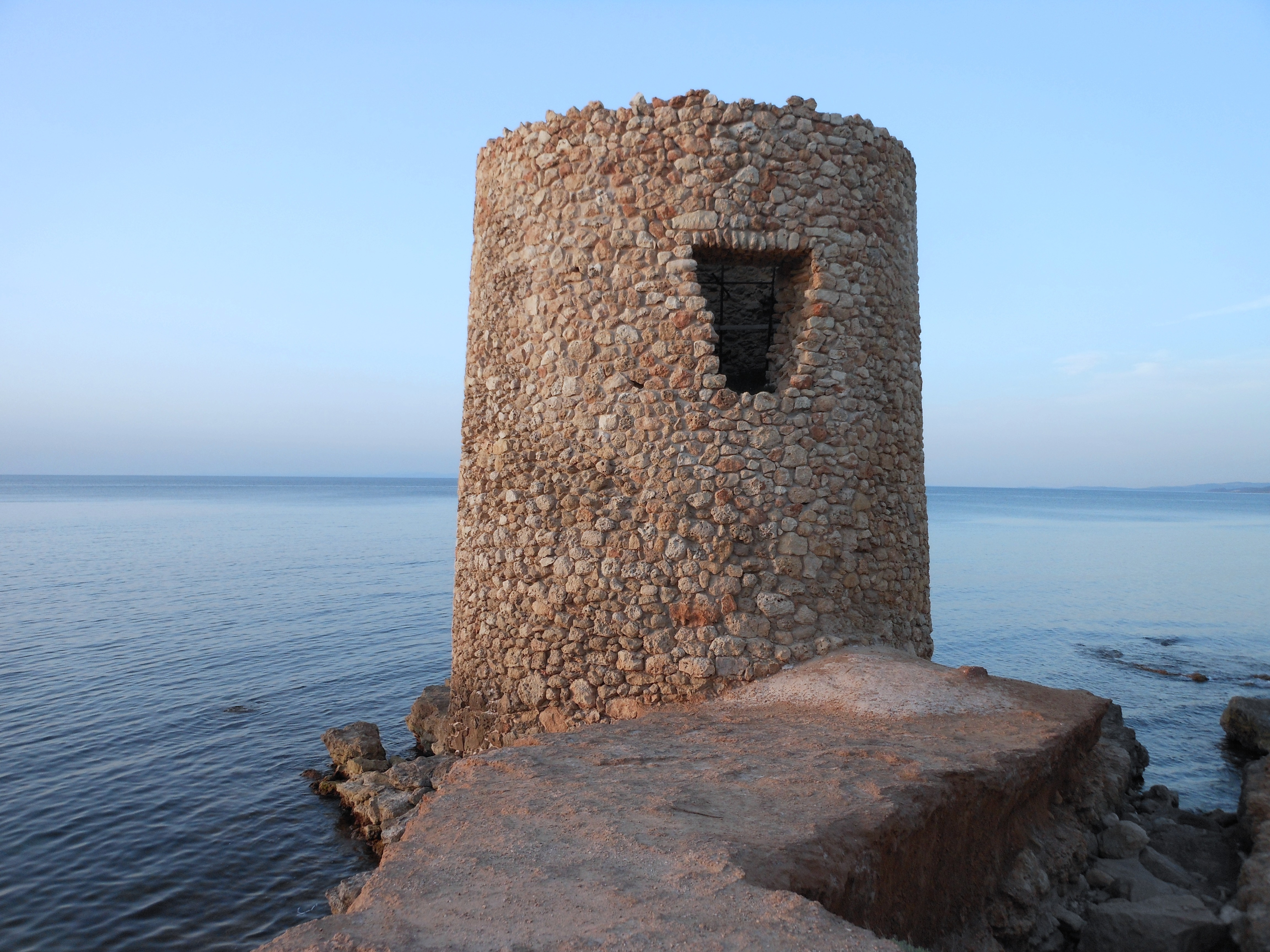
  Tower of Abbacurrente
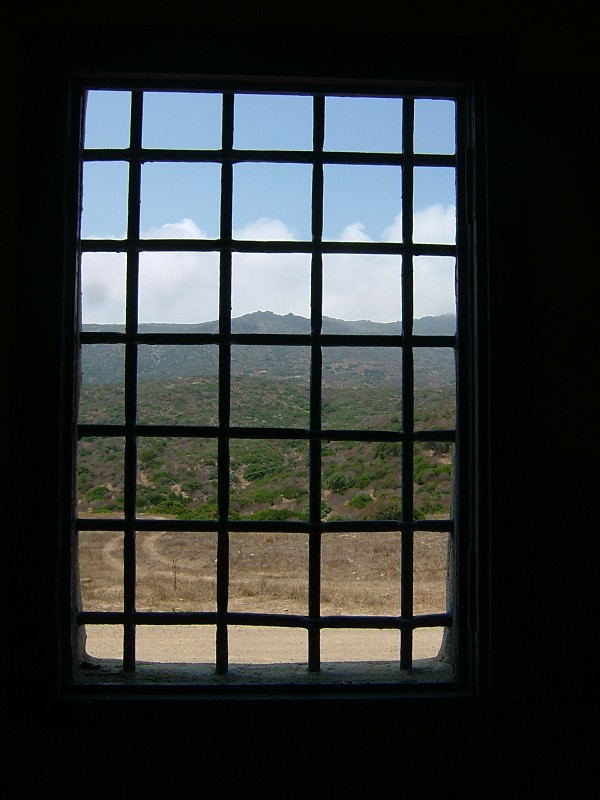
  View from one of the penitentiary's cell
- Tower of Abbacurrente (1571)
- Tower of the Finance (1525)
- Tower of Trabuccato (1609)
- Tower of Cala d'Oliva (1611)
- Tower of Cala d'Arena (1611)

Asinara penitentiary complex (1885)
Known as the "Italian Alcatraz", it became famous in Italy after a revolt happened during 2 October 1973. In the penitentiary of the Asinara has been detained the most dangerous criminals of the Sicilian Mafia, the Camorra, the Anonima sarda ant the Red Brigades. In more than one hundred years of activity the only prisoner who successfully escaped from the island penitentiary was the italian criminal Matteo Boe. During the WWI and the WWII it was used as an exile colony for thousands of POW and political prisoners. The penitentiary complex is composed by several sections located all around the island:
- Penitentiary section "Bunker of Cala d'Oliva"
- Penitentiary section of Cala d'Oliva
- Penitentiary section of Fornelli
- Penitentiary section of Santa Maria
- Penitentiary section of Tumbarino
- Penitentiary section of Campu Perdu
- Penitentiary section of Campo Faro
- Penitentiary section of Stretti
- Penitentiary section of Trabuccato
- Penitentiary section of Case Bianche
- Penitentiary section of Elighe Mannu

=== Archaeological sites ===
Nuraghes
- Nuraghe Biunisi
- Nuraghe Monte Elva
- Nuraghe Margone
- Nuraghe Nieddu
"Turris Libisonis" Archaeological park
- Roman bridge of Rio Mannu
- Palace of the "Re Barbaro" and domus of Orpheus
- Baths of Maetzke
- Baths of Pallottino (III secolo d.C)
- Mosaics's Domus (I secolo d.C.)
Other sites
- Necropolis of Su Crucifissu Mannu
- Domus de Janas of Campu Perdu (Asinara)
- Hypogeum et Columbarium of Tanca Borgona (II secolo d.C.)
- Hypogeum of Scoglio Lungo

=== Other ===
Main plazas
- Umberto I plaza, Main plaza of Porto Torres where there is located the Town Hall;
- Plaza of the "Martiri Turritani".

=== Natural areas ===
Protected areas
- Asinara National Park;
- Marine protected area of the Asinara;
- Sanctuary of the marine mammals.
Beaches

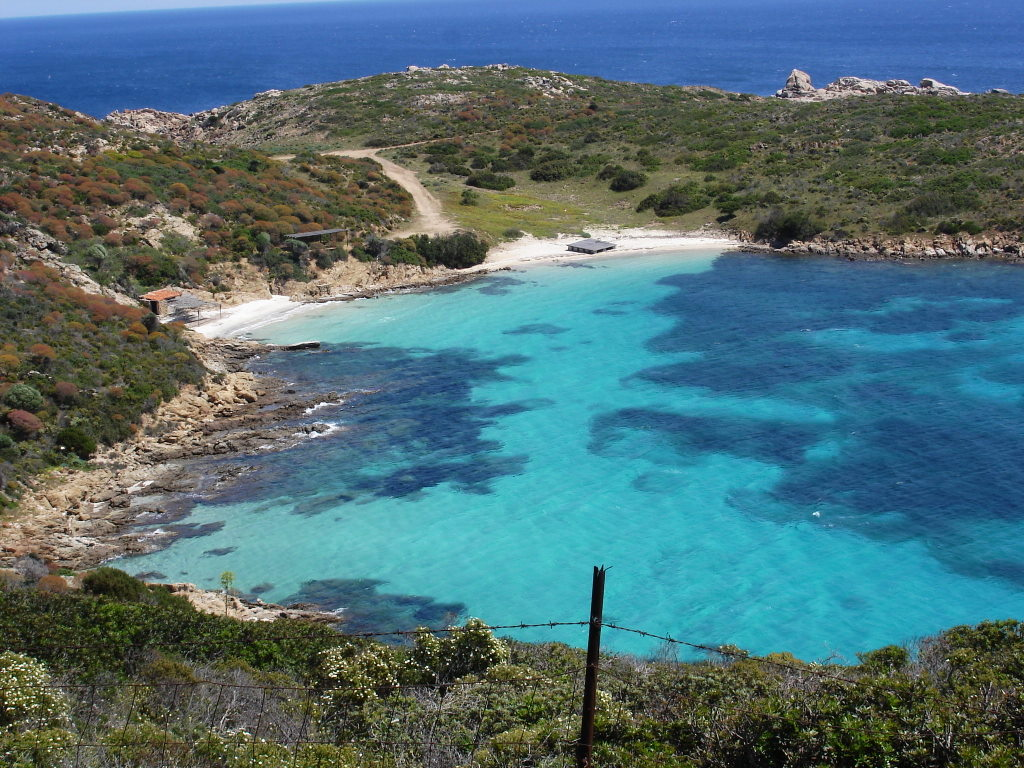
Cala Sabina, Isola Asinara

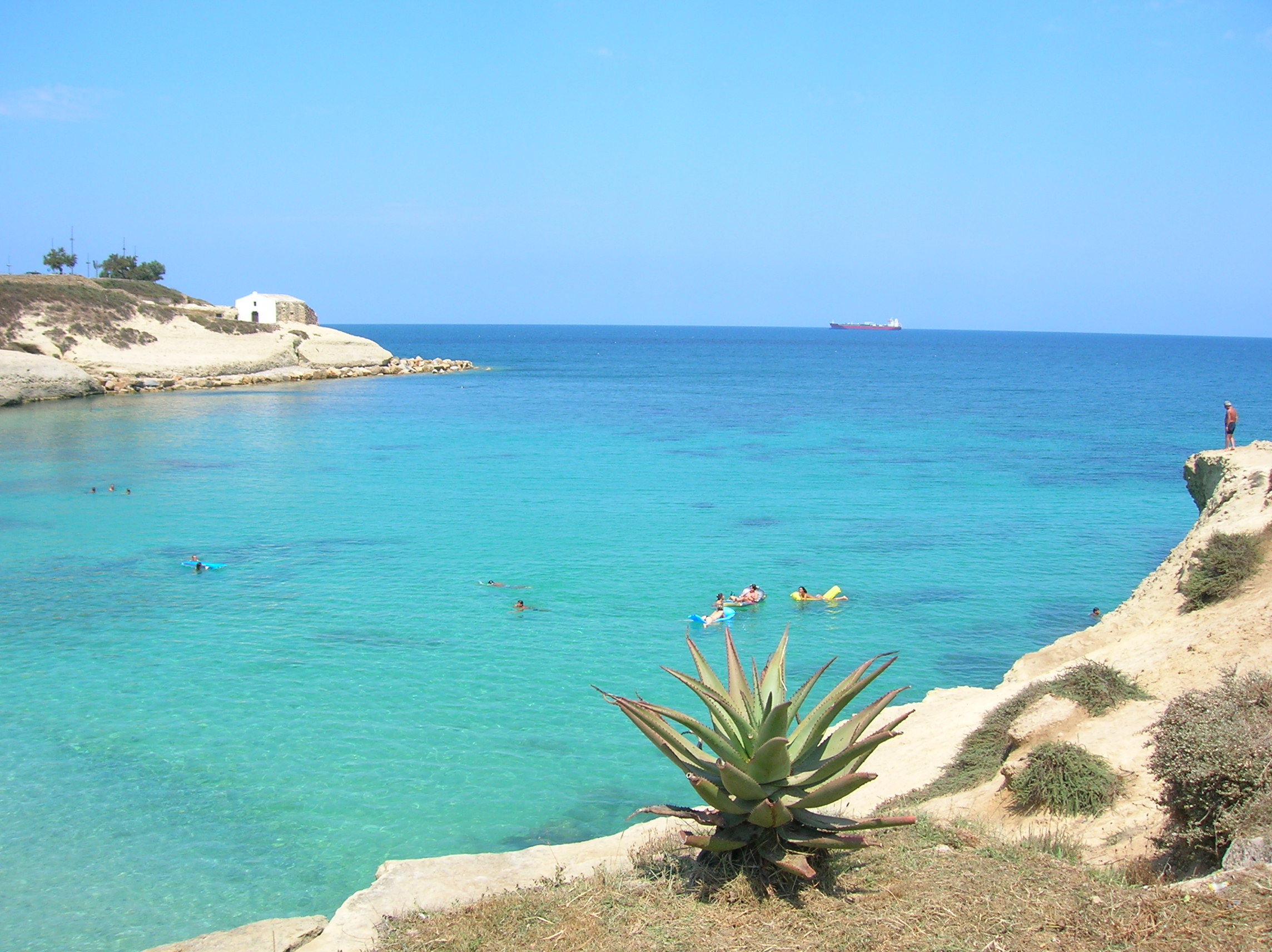
Beach of Balai

- Beach of Fiume Santo
- Beach of Renaredda
- Beach of the Scogliolungo
- Beach of Acque Dolci
- Beach of Balai
- Beach of the Scoglio Ricco
- Il Ponte
- Beach of Abbacurrente
- Beach of Farrizza
Main parks
- San Gavino's park;
- Robert Baden-Powell's park;
- Pinewood "La Farrizza" .

== Culture ==
=== Festivals ===
At the end of August it took place the festival called "Suoni & Sapori", a festival that put together the tasting of local food and the listening of music composed by local artists. "La giornata dello sport" is an annual local festival that promote the sport activity for both children and adults. The "Festival Internazionale di Musiche Polifoniche Voci d’Europa" organized by the local polyphonic choir is an annual music festival of the town. The "Fisherman's regatta" is a competition where the fishermen try to fishing using only traditional early 20th-century equipment like rowing boats without any use of modern tools like the GPS tracker.

== Economy ==
=== Tourism ===
Starting in 2008, tourism has become a very important activity for the economy of the city. The town have several attractions, both natural and anthropic. The main attraction is the Asinara National Park. The Aragonese seaport tower is considered the symbol of the city and because of this it is one of the main tourist attractions. Other main attractions are the Roman bridge of Riu Mannu and the Basilica of Saint Gavinus. Due to the decline of the industrial sector, the tourist sector has started to become the leading sector of the local economy (despite the local industrial zone, that importance for the city remains high).

=== Industry ===
Chemical industries support the modern economy of Porto Torres. Fiume Santo, a 1,040 MW power station owned by E.ON, is 5 to 10 kilometres (3 to 6 mi) west from the city, in the municipality of Sassari.

Plans related to industrial conversion are in progress in Porto Torres, where seven research centers are developing the transformation from traditional fossil fuel related industry to an integrated production chain from vegetable oil using oleaginous seeds to bioplastics.

=== Minor activities ===
Fishing and farming activities are also practiced around the land.

== Transport ==
=== Main roads ===
Road	Connection	Type	Notes
Strada Statale 131 "Carlo Felice"	Porto Torres – Cagliari	Dual carriageway European route state road	
Strada provinciale 93	Porto Torres – La Corte (SS)	Provincial road	
Strada Provinciale 81	Porto Torres – Platamona	Provincial road	
Strada Provinciale 57	Porto Torres – Palmadula (SS)	Provincial road	
Strada Provinciale 42 "Dei due mari"	Porto Torres – Alghero	Provincial road	
Strada Provinciale 34	Porto Torres – Stintino	Provincial road	
Strada Provinciale 25	Porto Torres – Sorso	Provincial road	

=== Train stations ===
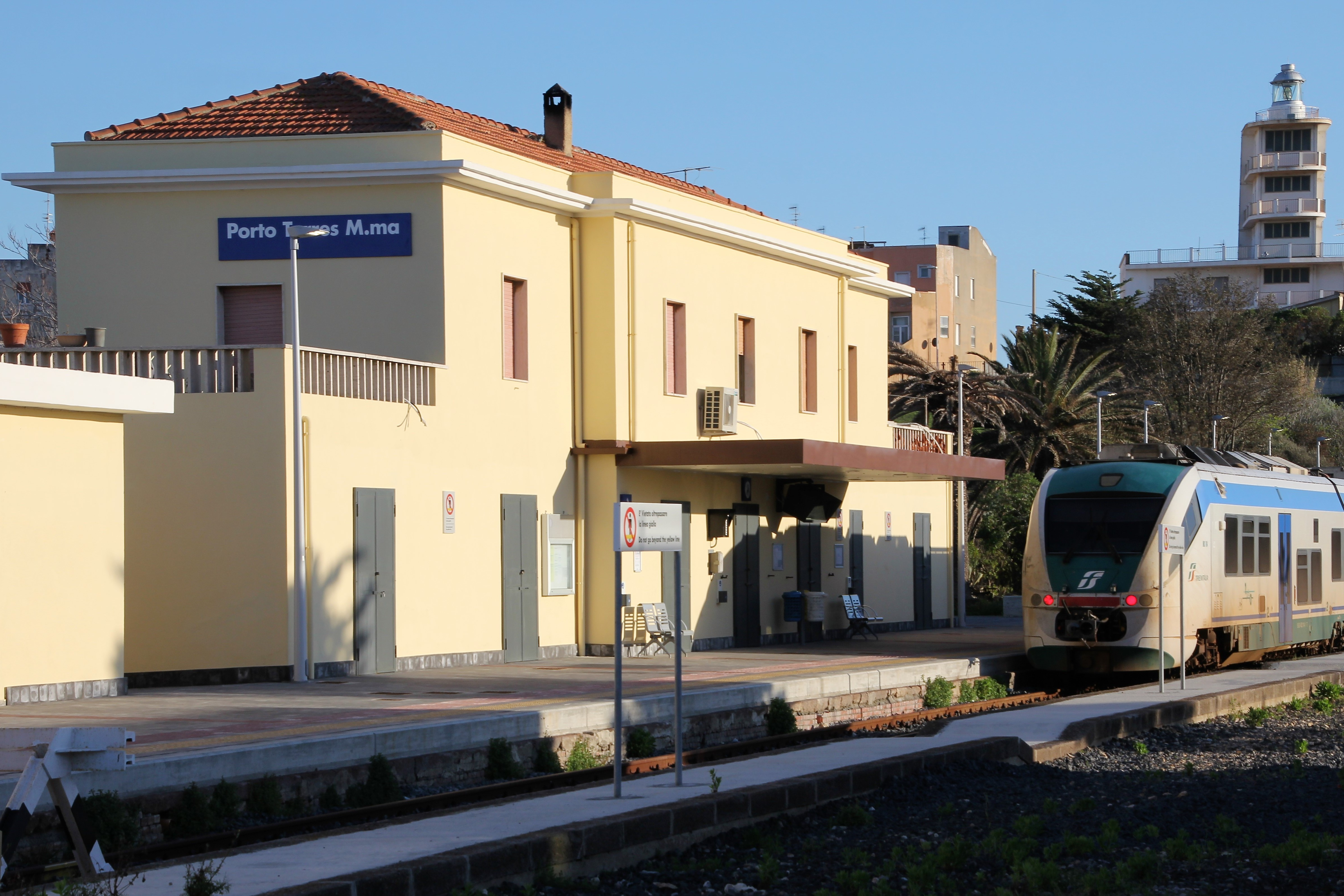
Porto Torres marittima.

A railway operated by Trenitalia connects the town with Sassari and the rest of the island. The town has two train stations, one built at the end of the 20th century (considered as the main station) and one smaller and more historical built during the 19th century (referred as "Porto Torres marittima").

=== Seaport ===
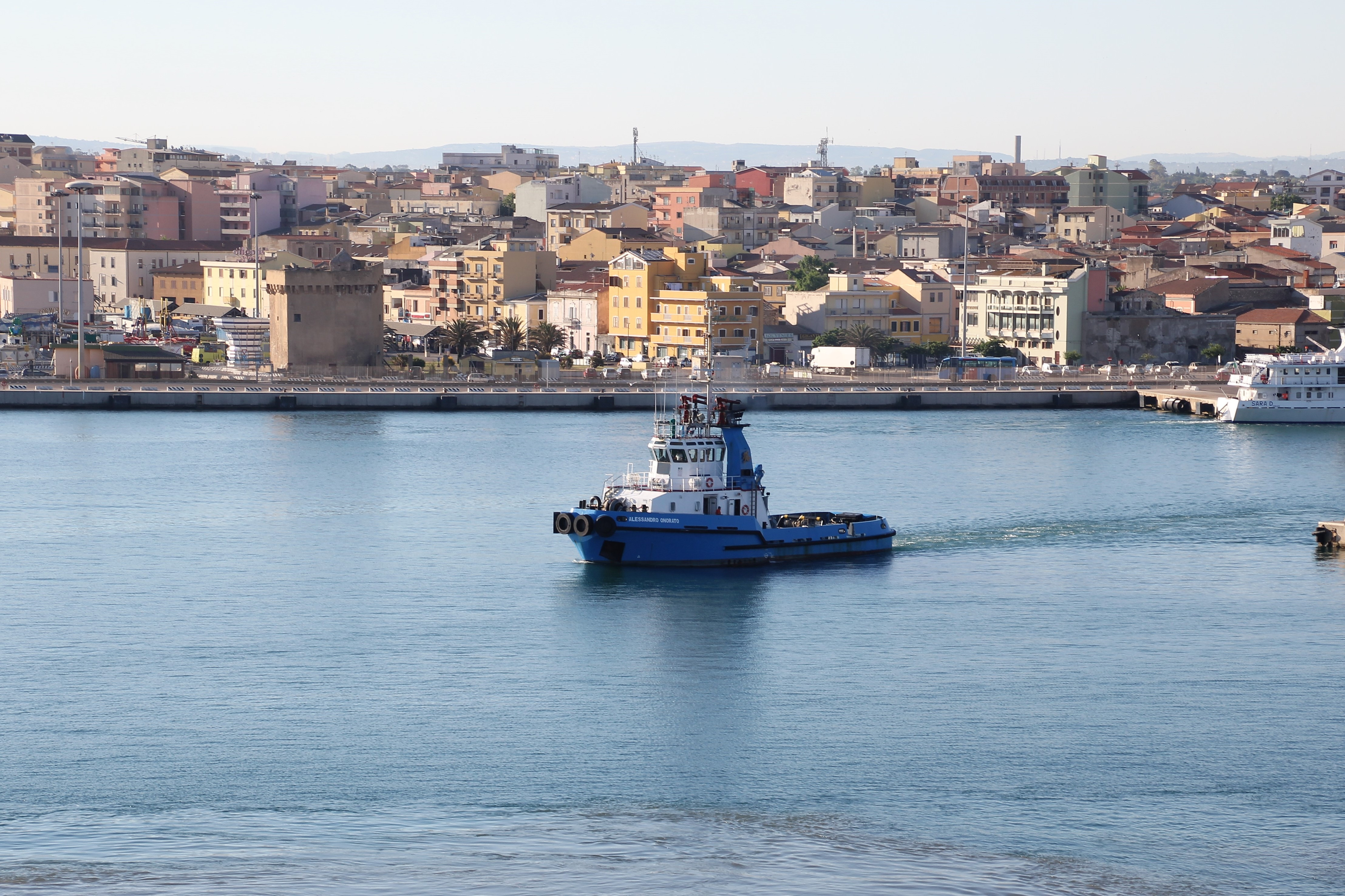
Port of Porto Torres.

The existing port of Porto Torres, which is almost wholly artificial, is based in great part on Roman foundations. In the north-west of Sardinia, the harbor of Porto Torres is the biggest. The city has connections with the rest of the Italy, of Spain and France. Not so far from the harbor there is the Maritime Terminal (Stazione marittima). In the same area there is built the new passenger terminal (Terminal passeggeri; the building is still under construction). From the seaport there is also available a connection for the island of Asinara.

Destinations:

Company			Route	Frequency	Notes
senza cornice	senza cornice	Tirrenia Grandi Navi Veloci	Genoa	Daily (winter) / Double-daily (summer) [with Tirrenia] Three times at week [with G.N.V.]	
senza cornice		Corsica Ferries - Sardinia Ferries	Ajaccio; Porto Vecchio; Livorno; Toulon	Weekly	
senza cornice	senza cornice	Grimaldi Lines	Civitavecchia	Five times at week	
senza cornice	senza cornice	Grimaldi Lines	Barcelona	Five times at week	
senza cornice	senza cornice	La Méridionale	Marseille	weekly	
senza cornice	senza cornice	La Méridionale	Propriano	weekly	
senza cornice	senza cornice	Delcomar	Asinara	Daily (Summer and Spring); Three times at week (Winter and Autumn)	

=== Public transport ===
Porto Torres is part of the metropolitan network of north Sardinia (Italian "Rete metropolitana del nord Sardegna"). Due to this, the city is well-connected with nearly all towns via intercity autobus provided by ARST. Local rides are managed by the local public transport agency (A.t.p. Sassari).

== Education ==
=== School ===
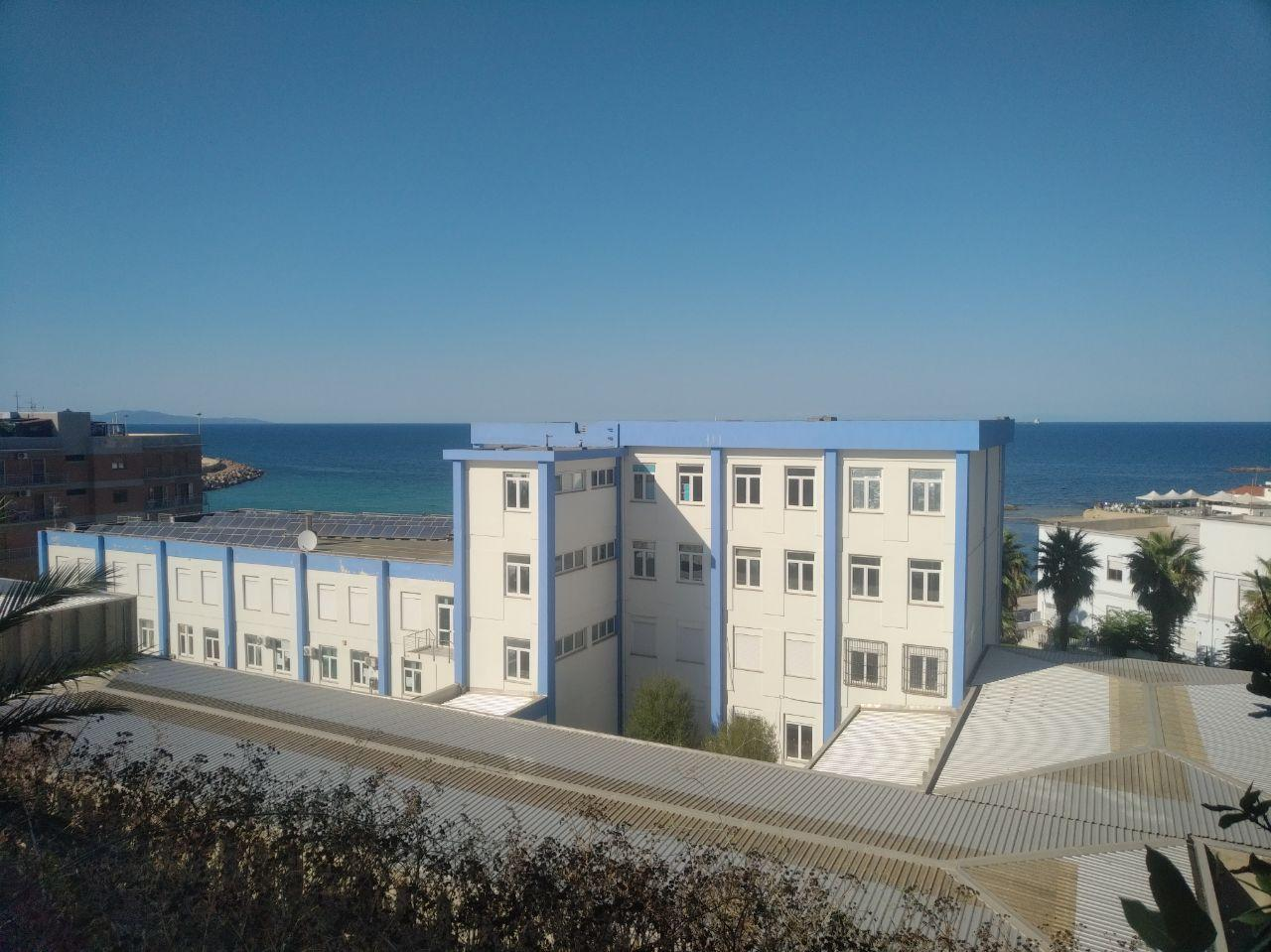
"M. Paglietti" High School

The town has many state secondary schools and several state primary schools within it. In the urban area there is also a music school named in memory of the Italian songwriter Fabrizio De André.

Being near the city of Sassari, as well as, the intercity lines managed by ARST, travel to the University of Sassari is available.

=== Libraries ===
The "Antonio Pigliaru" public library is the only one in the town.

== Media ==
=== Local newspapers ===
- In...città;
- Il Corriere del Turritano;
- La Voce Turritana.

=== Radio stations ===
- Radio del Golfo

=== Cinematography ===
- Bonifacio Angius – "Ovunque proteggimi" (2018).

== Sport ==
=== Football ===
Main football clubs:

- Porto Torres Calcio (Serie D)
- Turris
- Polisportiva Dilettantistica Quartieri Riuniti (A.k.a. "Quartieri Riuniti")
- Turritana

=== Tennis ===
Main association:

- A.S.D. Tennis Club Porto Torres

=== Basket ===
Main associations:

- GSD Porto Torres
- CMB Porto Torres
- Silver Basket Porto Torres
- Balai Basket

=== Martial arts and combat sports ===
There are many boxing clubs and martial arts schools. Sports like Karate shotokan, MMA, Boxing, Jujitsu, Krav-Maga and Self-defense are very appreciated and practiced by some part of the citizens.

=== Athletics ===
Main association:

- A.S.D. Atletica Leggera Porto Torres (associated with FIDAL)

=== Equestrianism ===
Right below the ancient Roman bridge Porto Torres has a riding hall where the local A.S.D. Centro Ippico Equitazione Porto Torres practice horse riding.

=== Sport facilities ===
Sports area "Cittadella dello sport"
A 67.000 m² area which offer many sports.

Main area ("Campo sportivo comunale" or "Stadio comunale")

It is a multi-purpose stadium mainly composed with:
- 1 football pitch of 60 x 105 meters (home ground of the A.C. Porto Torres)
- Running track
- Shot put area
- Discus throw area
- Hammer throw area
- Javelin throw area
- Pole vault area
- High jump area

Other areas

- Boxing club "Alberto Mura"
- Tennis club
- 1 football pitch of 105 x 603 meters
- 1 football pitch of 100 x 60 meters

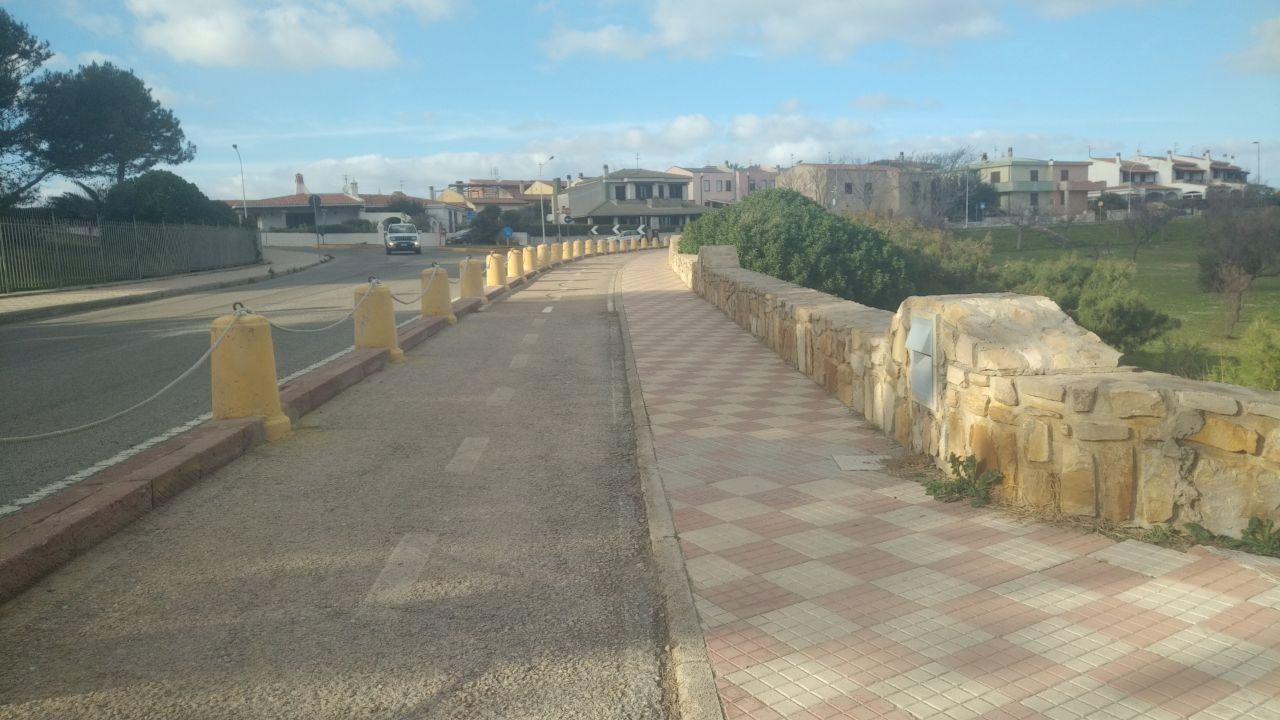
Bicycle path between Parco Chico Mendes and Parco Balai vicino.

Palasport "Alberto Mura"
A sport facility with a capacity of 1.600 people mainly used as an indoor basketball court.
Skate park
A 1.800 m² skateboard park with a bank ramp of 20°, a square-rail, a pyramid ledges and a quarter pipe.
Football pitch "Angelo Occone"
Football pitch of 100 x 60 meters situated not so far from the town hall.
Other

Artificial pine forest
Called "Pineta la Farrizza", "Pineta Abbacurrente" or "Pineta Balai lontano", it is composed mainly of stone pines.
Bicycle Path
Starting from "Piazza eroi dell'onda" and finishing in the plaza of "Balai lontano", it offers a panoramic view of the sea.

== Notable people ==
- Francesco Demuro (born 1978), operatic tenor
- Alessandro Frau (born 1977), former footballer
- Giuseppe Mura (born 1943), retired boxer
- Andrea Parodi (1955–2006), singer
- Fiorenzo Serra (1921–2005), film director and documentarist

== International relations ==
=== Twin towns – sister cities ===
- Camposano, Italy, since 2016
