= Fiorenzo Serra =

Italian film director

- Born: May 3, 1921; Porto Torres, Italy
- Died: September 28, 2005 (aged 84); Sassari, Italy

Fiorenzo Serra (3 May 1921 in Porto Torres – 28 September 2005 in Sassari) was an Italian film director and documentarist.

He produced 66 movies and documentaries, mainly based on Sardinia's ethnographic, social and cultural themes.

He won the Agis Prize for the documentary L'Ultimo Pugno di Terra in 1966, realised together the novelist Giuseppe Dessì and the future Italian minister Giuseppe Pisanu, with the supervision of the screenwriter Cesare Zavattini.

== Bibliography ==
- AA.VV., L'ultimo pugno di terra. Il film di Fiorenzo Serra sulla Rinascita, Filmpraxis - Quaderni della Cineteca Sarda n. 6, ed. Maestrale, Nuoro, 2014.ISBN 978-88-6429-155-0
- Giulio Angioni, Manlio Brigaglia et Alii, Fiorenzo Serra: la mia terra è un'isola, Nuoro, Ilisso, 2010

== Legacy ==
The "Fiorenzo Serra" Visual Anthropology Laboratory of the Società Umanitaria-Cineteca Sarda, with the collaboration of the History Department of University of Sassari, annually organises Fiorenzo Serra Film Festival.
