= Gulf of Asinara =

Coordinates: 40°56′0.55″N 8°27′41.52″E

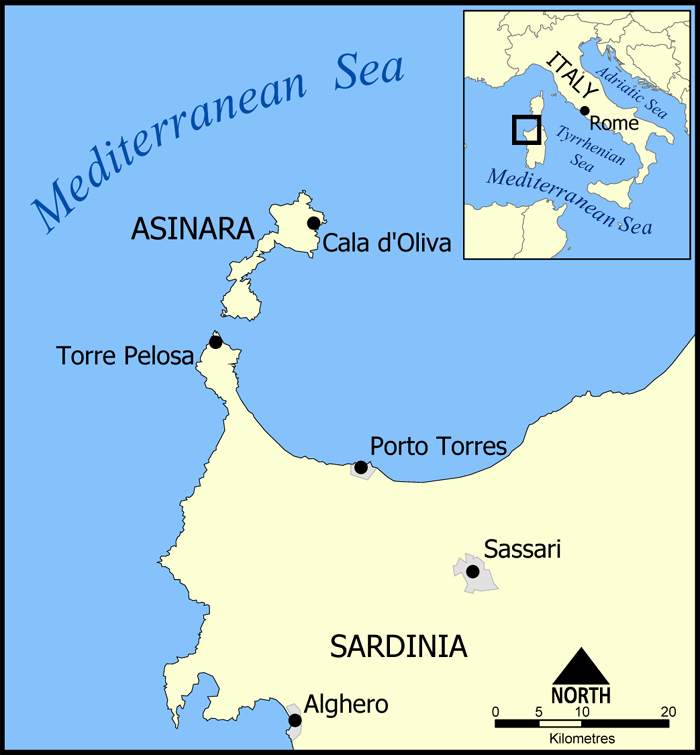
Asinara and its gulf.

The Gulf of Asinara is a sea sector included between the eastern coast of Asinara Island, Cape Falcone and the town of Castelsardo, in northern Sardinia, Italy. The communes facing its coast include also Stintino, Porto Torres, Sassari, Sorso, Valledoria and Badesi.

The littoral features several beaches, some kilometers long, such as La Pelosa, le Saline Ezzi Mannu and Fiume Santo, those near Porto Torres, Platamona, the beaches of Castelsardo, Valledoria, Badesi, Trinità d'Agultu, Vignola and Isola Rossa.

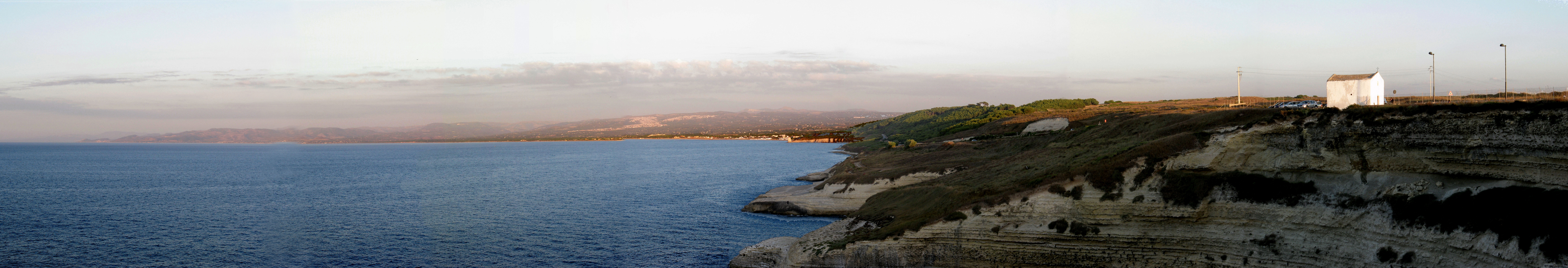
the Gulf of Asinara near Porto Torres

Geologically, the Gulf of Asinara is the northern end of a long depression extending the entire island of Sardinia south to the Gulf of Cagliari.
