= Sorso =

Sorso Sossu
- Comune
- Città di Sorso
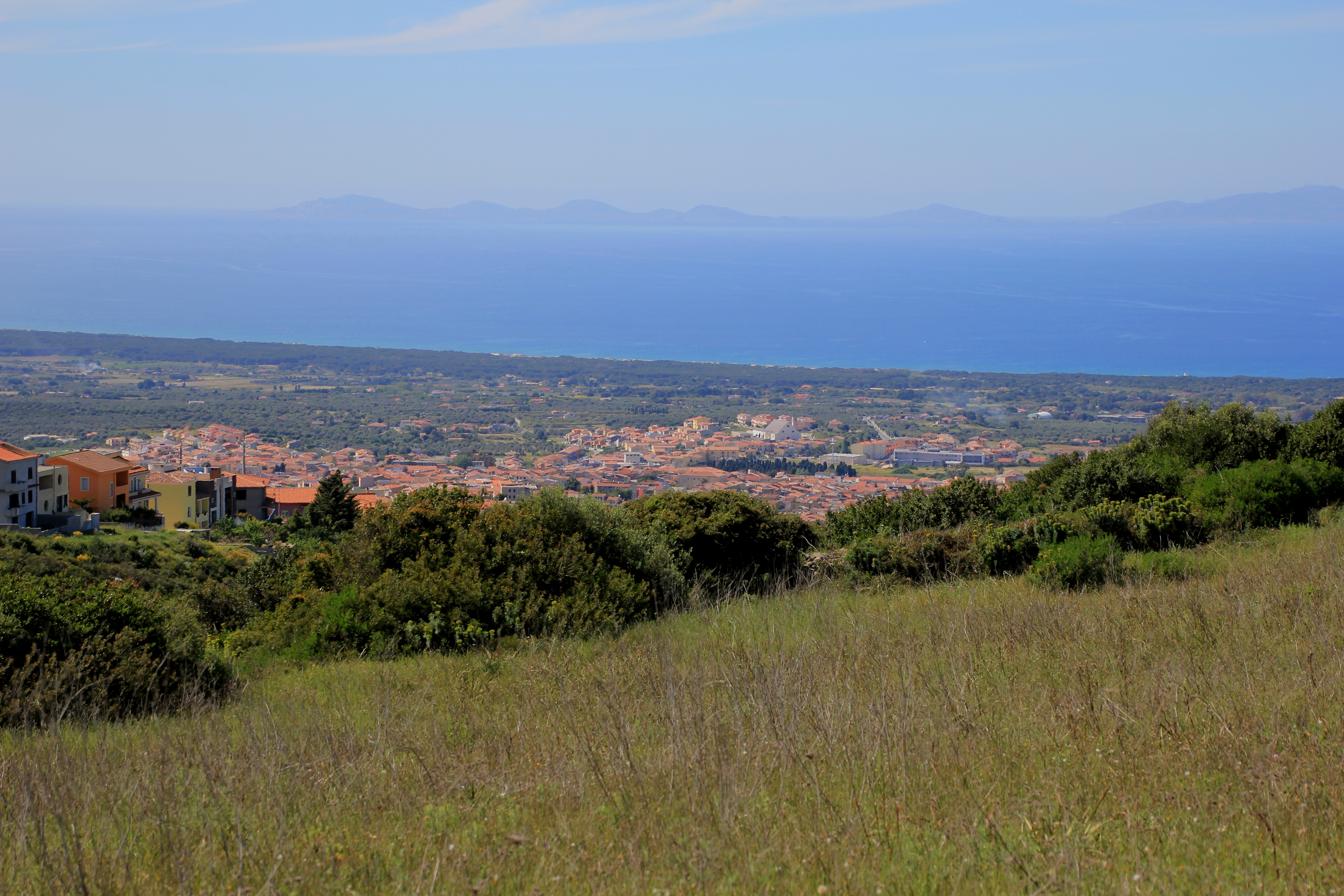
- Panorama from Sennori

- Coat of arms

- Location within Sardinia
- Coordinates: 40°48′N 8°34′E
- Country: Italy
- Region: Sardinia
- Metropolitan city: Sassari (SS)
- Frazioni: Marina di Sorso

Government
  - Mayor: Fabrizio Demelas

Area
  - Total: 67.05 km^{2} (25.89 sq mi)
- Elevation: 136 m (446 ft)

Population (31 December 2008)
  - Total: 14,718
  - Density: 219.5/km^{2} (568.5/sq mi)
- Demonym(s): Sorsesi or Sorsensi (Italian), Sussinchi (Sassarese)
- Time zone: UTC+1 (CET)
  - Summer (DST): UTC+2 (CEST)
- Postal code: 07037
- Dialing code: 079
- Patron saint: St. Pantaleon
- Saint day: July 27

Sorso (Sassarese: Sòssu) is a comune (municipality) of c. 14,700 inhabitants in the Metropolitan City of Sassari in the Italian region Sardinia, located about 8 kilometres (5 mi) north of Sassari.

== Overview ==
Sorso is a tourist resort facing the Gulf of Asinara. Apart tourism, the economy is mostly based on agriculture. The local dialect is a variant of Sassarese.

The judike (King) Barisone III of Torres was assassinated at Sorso during a peasant revolt in 1236.
