= Riviera del Corallo =

The Riviera del Corallo (Costera del Coral in Catalan Algherese) is a coastal stretch of north-west Sardinia in the south of the Nurra plain, which includes the town of Alghero. It is so called because of the great importance of the red coral that is fished in its waters and worked to make jewellery and ornaments since the days of ancient Rome.

It is a tourist region comprised almost entirely in the town of Alghero, overlooking the Sea of Sardinia, more precisely on the bay of Alghero.

In addition to Alghero there are some hamlets, among which are Fertilia, Maristella, Tramariglio. These otherwise quiet places are crowded especially in the summer months. The Alghero-Fertilia/Riviera del Corallo airport serves the area, attracting numerous tourists both Italians and foreigners due to the growing supply of domestic and European destinations.

Its territory includes the two main types: mostly flat in the area south of the city and mixed north: here is the highest relief of the area, Mount D' Olla or Doglia, which with 442 meters, It stands as the highest peak in the area. In the northwest instead it stands the massive promontory of Capo Caccia that dominates the bay.

Along the coast ar many inlets and the southern part of the coast looks jagged (with the exception of Poglina beach at La Speranza); in the northern part is devoted to beaches that wind from the port of Alghero to Fertilia (about 7 km) and then give way, once the hamlet, inlets and coves interspersed with beaches including Bombarde, to arrive in Porto Conte, near which lies the village of Maristella. Proceeding to the north - west is the Mugoni beach before arriving to meet the villages of Tramariglio and Pischina Salida, before arriving at Capo Caccia, where, among other things, is land access to the Neptune's Grotto.
