= Porto Conte =

Natural inlet on the Riviera del Corallo, Sardinia

Coordinates: 40.59°N 8.19°E

The bay of Porto Conte (Sardinian:Portu Conte, Catalan:Port del Comte) is a natural inlet on the Riviera del Corallo, a locality on the northwest coast of Sardinia, in the sea of the same name, protected following the establishment of the Porto Conte Regional Nature Park. It is enclosed between the karst promontories of Capo Caccia and Punta Giglio and faces the Alghero roadstead; it is about 20 km from Alghero itself. It measures from the mouth to the bottom 6 km, with a width of about 2.5 km. The coastal part consists of small inlets, cliffs, and the long sandy beach of Mugoni pine forest.

== History ==
Known in Roman times as Nimpharum Portus, or port of the nymphs, it is one of the largest natural harbors in the Mediterranean, sheltered from northwest winds. For this reason it has always been of great strategic importance in past centuries.

The earliest evidence of human presence in the area dates back to the Neolithic period, with finds dated to the sixth millennium B.C. at the Green Cave. There are also numerous evidences from the Nuragic period at the localities of Palmavera and Sant'Imbenia. In the latter locality the remains of a Roman villa have been found.

On August 27, 1353, the Aragonese admiral Bernat II de Cabrera and the Venetian Niccolò Pisani routed the Genoese fleet in the Battle of Porto Conte; a thousand Genoese died, while there were 3,500 prisoners and more than 2,000 wounded. The town was later repopulated by the Catalans.

Since 1999 the place has been under naturalistic protection in the land area with the Porto Conte regional park and since 1983 in the marine part with the Capo Caccia - Isola Piana natural marine protected area. It has a relevant importance in terms of nature and tourism, so much so that many tourist, sporting and scientific activities are practiced there, such as: scuba diving, caving, trekking, climbing, botany, bird watching, archaeology, research, enology, nature photography. There are also some specimens of white donkey imported from Asinara housed in the regional park to help preserve the breed.

Antoine de Saint-Exupéry, author of The Little Prince, spent the last two months of his life in Porto Conte in a villa located upstream from the Torre Nuova, from May to July 1944, before the tragic epilogue with the crash of his plane.

== Territory ==
The morphology of the territory is quite varied. The coastal area between Capo Caccia and Punta Giglio is characterized by large stretches of cliffs alternating with less steep portions. The immediate hinterland, on the other hand, is characterized by low hills alternating with plains. For naturalistic reasons, the Calich pond has been included, despite its considerable distance from the Porto Conte area, which is connected to the sea by an artificial canal built in the late 1930s during the reclamation works carried out in the region. It represents an important ecosystem for the variety of animal and plant life it hosts.

Geologically, the area is characterized by limestone rocks from which, due to the effect of water, numerous karst caves have originated. Among the highest elevations in the park are Punta Cristallo, with its 326 meters above sea level, and Mount Doglia, which reaches 442 meters.

== Climate ==
In the Porto Conte area, as in almost the entire territory of Sardinia, the climate, according to Köppen's climate classification, is Mediterranean. It is characterized by mild, wet winters and hot, dry summers. The average annual temperature is between 16 and 17 °C while precipitation is around 600 millimeters per year. The dominant winds are the mistral and the libeccio.

== Flora ==
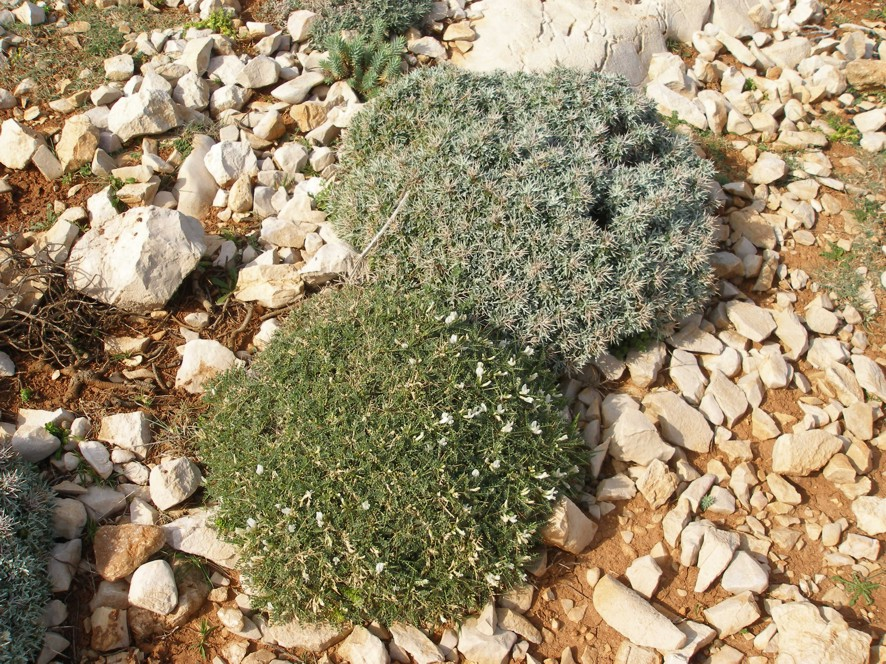
Centaurea horrida and Astragalus terracianoi on Piana Island

The plant formations present in the protected area consist of holly, Mediterranean scrub, garrigue and conifer reforestations. The latter owe their existence to the Porto Conte - Prigionette forest site, managed by the Forestas agency, enclosed between the north coast of the gulf and the sheer cliffs of Torre Pegna, Punta Cristallo and Punta Gessiere. The most substantial areas of holm oak forest are found near punta Giglio.

Species found in the garrigue include marine cistus (Cistus monspeliensis), rosemary (Rosmarinus officinalis), betonya fetida (Stachys glutinosa), Corsican broom (Genista Corsica), thyme (Thymus spp.) timelea (Thymelaea tartonraira) and helichrysum (Helicrisum microphyllum), but thorny cornflower (Centaurea horrida), dragon lobster (Astragalus tragacantha), Balearic euphorbia (Euphorbia pithyusa) and nymphaeus statice (Limonium nymphaeus) are also found there. Along the coast vegetate the small shrubs of Terracciano's astragalus (Astragalus terraccianoi), Sardinian broom (Genista sardoa) and thorny witchgrass (Stachys glutinosa), associated with herbaceous species such as sea lily (Pancratium illyricum), silene nodulosa (Silene nodulosa), Corsican geranium (Erodium corsicum), Bocconi fennel (Seseli bocconi), Schmid's curd (Valium schmidii), spatulate daisy (Bellium bellidioides), pauciflorous garlic (Allium parciflorum), Requien's saffron (Romulea requienii), lesser saffron (Crocus minimus), gigarum (Arum pictum), asphodel (Asphodelus microcarpus), and nettle verdescura (Urtica atrovirens).

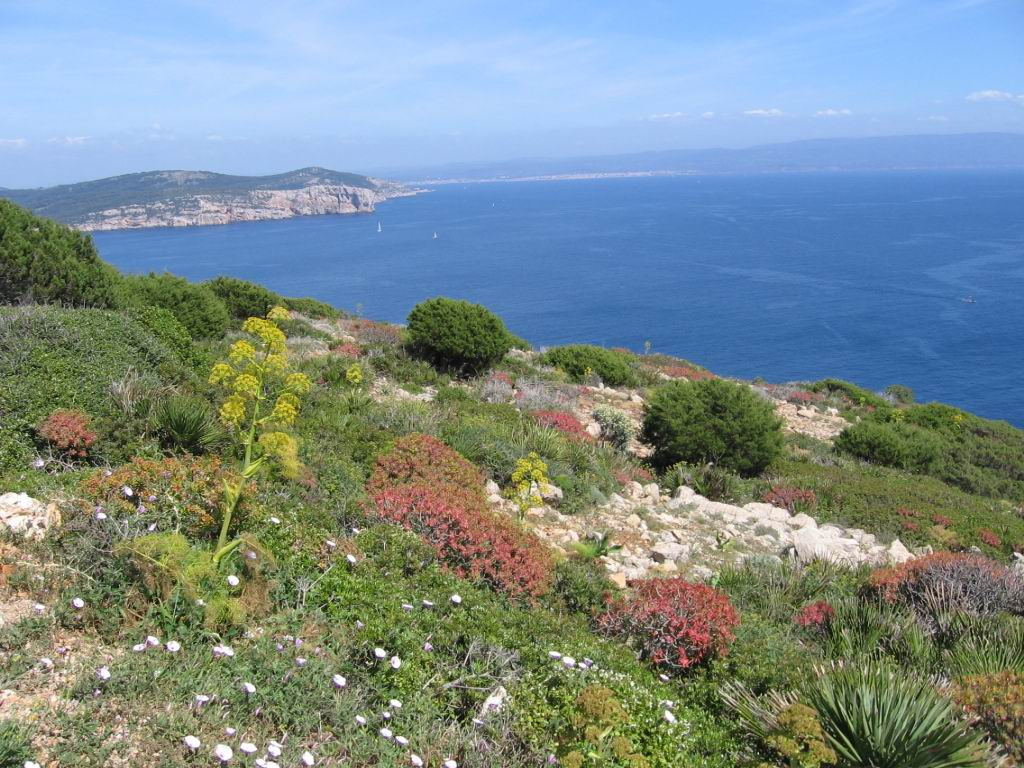
Typical Mediterranean vegetation on the southern slope of Cape Caccia

The woodlands, on the other hand, consist mainly of holm oak (Quercus ilex), which is also alternated with strawberry tree (Arbutus unedo), which, in scrub formations is often found associated with tree heath (Erica arborea). The undergrowth is characterized by species such as butcher's broom (Ruscus aculeatus), stinging asparagus (Asparagus acutifolius), spring cyclamen (Cyclamen repandum) and white asparagus (Asparagus albus). The scrub is also populated by characteristic species such as Phoenician juniper (Juniperus phoenicea), lentisk (Pistacia lentiscus), phillyrea (Phillyrea angustifolia), and wild olive (Olea europaea sylvestris), arborescent spurge (Euphorbia dendroides), bushy spurge (Euphorbia characias), dwarf palm (Chamaerops humilis), woody trefoil (Dorycnium pentaphyllum), red cistus (Cistus incanus) and female cistus (Cistus salvifolius).

Sea fennel (Crithmum maritimum), chamforosma (Camphorosma monspeliaca), senecio (Senecio leucanthemifolius) mesembryanthemum (Mesembryanthemum nodiflorum), sea cabbage (Brassica insularis), crag mallow (Lavatera marittima) grow among the cliffs of Cape Caccia and Punta Giglio, Aleppo rue (Ruta chalepensis), wild leek (Allium ampeloprasum) and wild wallflower (Matthiola tricuspidata), while southern polypodium (Polypodium australe), cedargrass (Ceterach officinarum) and yellow narcissus (Narcissus bertolonii) vegetate in shaded areas.

== Fauna ==
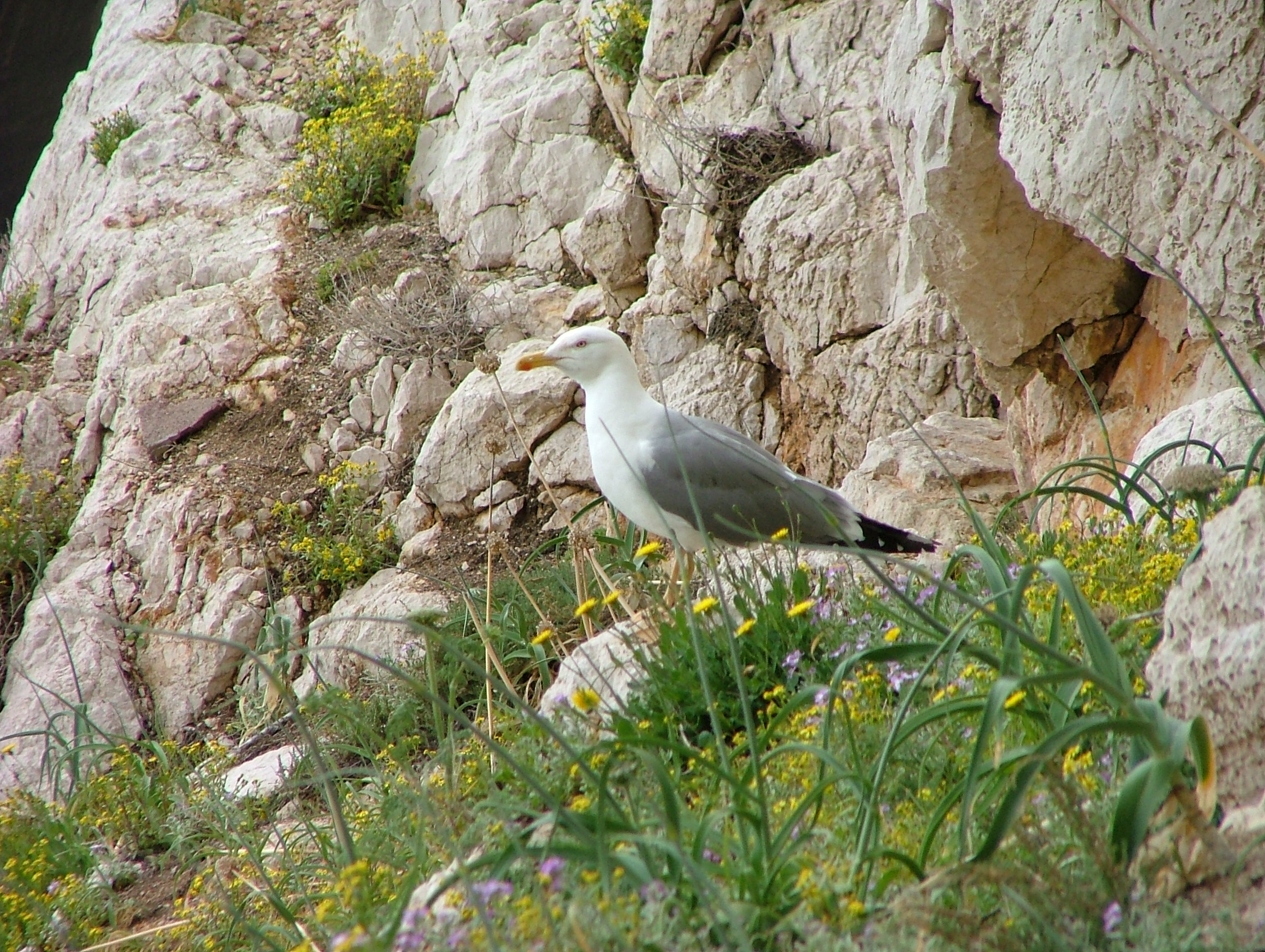
A Mediterranean herring gull (Larus michahellis) on the cliffs of Capo Caccia

Mammals that inhabit the Mediterranean scrub and garrigue areas are the wild rabbit (Oryctolagus cuniculus) and the Sardinian hare (Lepus capensis mediterraneus). In the 1970s, fallow deer (Dama dama), Giara ponies (Equus caballus giarae) and white donkeys (Equus asinus var. albina) from Asinara were reintroduced in the area of the forestry yard managed by the Forestry Authority. Other common mammals include the Sardinian wild boar (Sus scrofa meridionalis), weasel (Mustela nivalis) and fox (Vulpes vulpes).

Among birds, the most common species are the Sardinian partridge (Alectoris barbara), Sardinian warbler (Sylvia melanocephala), magnanine (Sylvia undata), black bunting (Emberiza cirlus) and wren (Troglodytes troglodytes). Wooded areas are populated by the chaffinch (Fringilla coelebs), chickadee (Parus caeruleus), great tit (Parus major) and great spotted woodpecker (Dendrocopos major). During the migration period, turtle dove (Streptopelia turtur), wood pigeon (Columba palumbus), woodlark (Columba livia) and woodcock (Scolopax rusticola) can be spotted. The most common waterfowl, are the black-winged stilt (Himantopus himantopus), the little egret (Egretta garzetta), the grey heron (Ardea cinerea), the pink flamingo (Phoenicopterus roseus), mallard (Anas platyrhynchos), little grebe (Tachybaptus ruficollis), great crested grebe (Podiceps cristatus) cormorant (Phalacrocorax carbo), coot (Fulica atra) and little tern (Sterna albifrons).
