= Porto Conte Lighthouse =

Lighthouse in Italy

Porto Conte
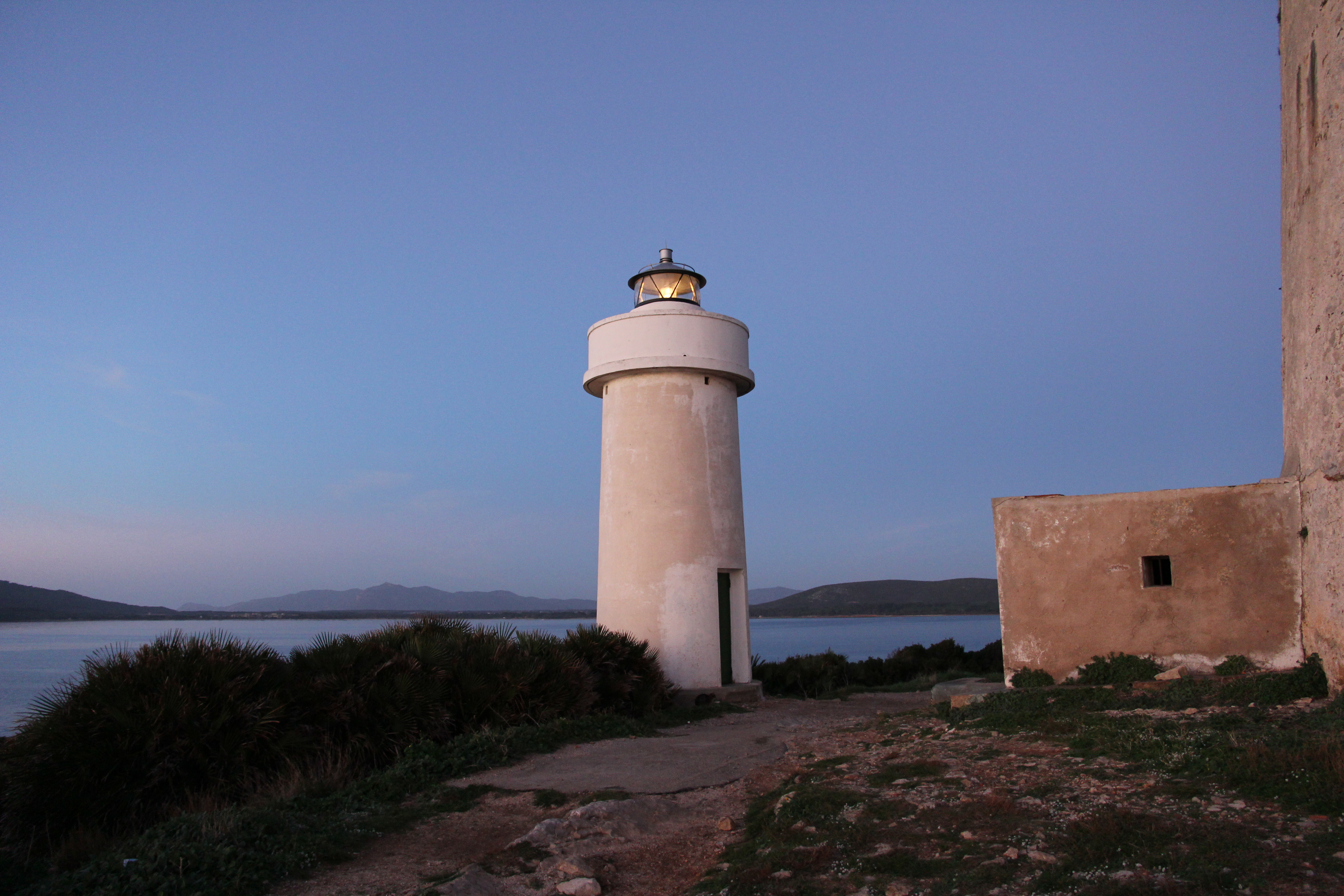
- Porto Conte Lighthouse
- Location: Porto Conte; Alghero; Sardinia; Italy
- Coordinates: 40°35′38″N 8°12′15″E

Tower
- Constructed: 1918 (first)
- Foundation: concrete base
- Construction: concrete tower
- Height: 8 metres (26 ft)
- Shape: cylindrical tower with balcony and lantern
- Markings: white tower, balcony and lantern; grey metallic lantern roof
- Power source: solar power
- Operator: Marina Militare
- Fog signal: no

Light
- Focal height: 17 metres (56 ft)
- Lens: Type TD 300; Focal length: 150mm
- Intensity: MaxiHalo-60 EFF
- Range: 10 nautical miles (19 km; 12 mi)
- Characteristic: Fl W 3s.
- Italy no.: 1422 E.F.

Porto Conte Lighthouse (Italian: Faro di Porto Conte) is an active lighthouse located on a promontory, halfway on the east side of the bay of Porto Conte, opposite to Capo Caccia Lighthouse and west of Alghero on the Sea of Sardinia.

== Description ==
The first lighthouse was established in 1918, the current light consists of a concrete cylindrical tower, 8 metres (26 ft) high, with balcony and lantern; the tower, the balcony and the lantern are painted white; the lantern roof in grey metallic. The light is positioned at 17 metres (56 ft) above sea level and emits one white flash in a 3 seconds period visible up to a distance of 10 nautical miles (19 km; 12 mi). The lighthouse is completely automated, powered by a solar unit, and managed by the Marina Militare with the identification code number 1422 E.F. The lighthouse is placed in front of a massive Aragonese period tower built in 1572, 13 metres (43 ft) high with a diameter of 18 metres (59 ft).

== See also ==
- List of lighthouses in Italy
