= Stintino =

Stintino Isthintini
- Comune
- Comune di Stintino
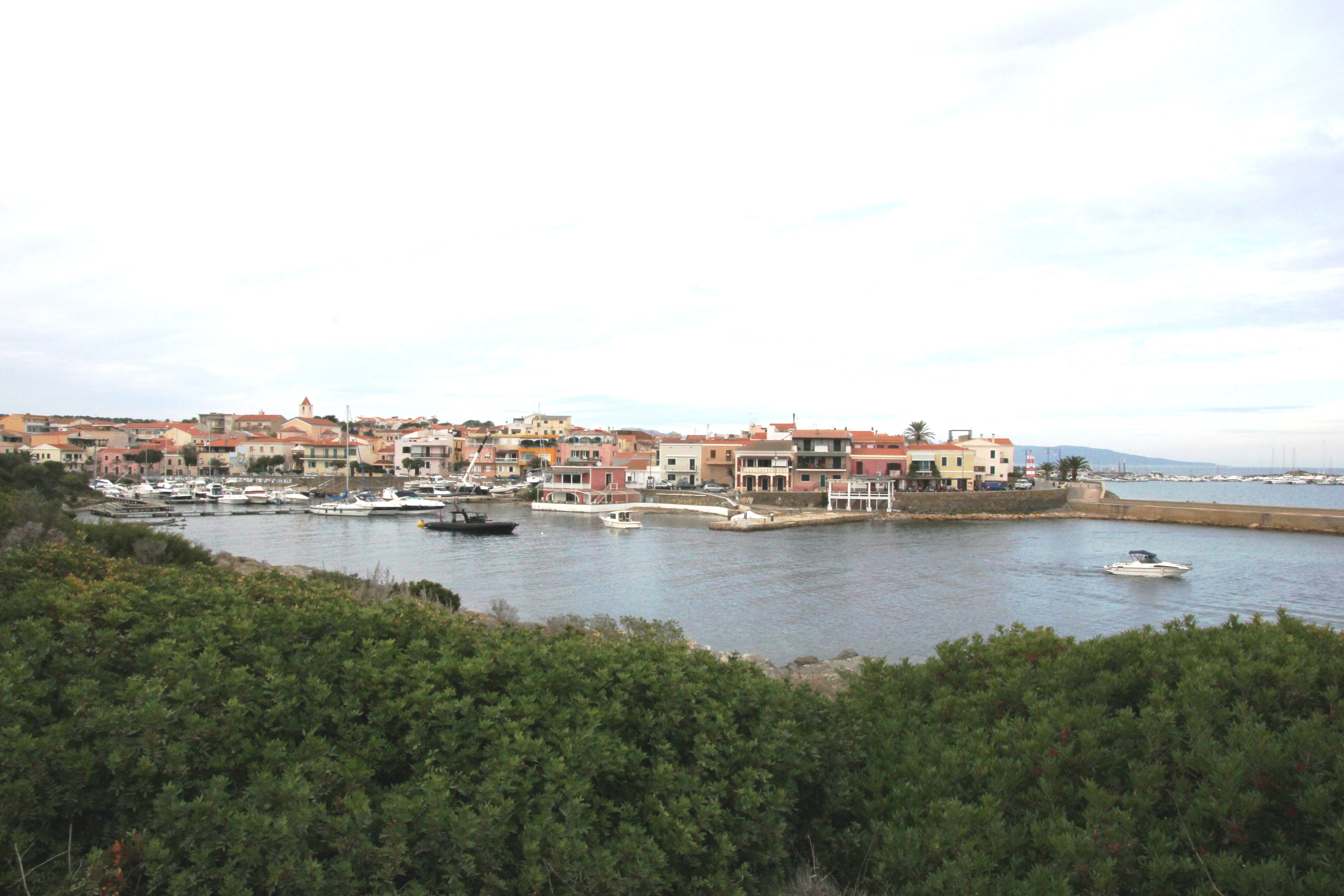

- Coat of arms

- Stintino within the Metropolitan City of Sassari

- Location within Sardinia
- Coordinates: 40°56′N 8°14′E
- Country: Italy
- Region: Sardinia
- Metropolitan city: Sassari (SS)
- Frazioni: Ercoli, Ezzi Mannu, Le Vele, Nodigheddu, Pischina Salidda, Pittiacca, Pozzo San Nicola, Preddu Nieddu, Punta Su Turrione, Rocca Ruja, Tonnara Saline, Unia

Government
  - Mayor: Rita Limbania Vallebella

Area
  - Total: 58.4 km^{2} (22.5 sq mi)
- Elevation: 9 m (30 ft)

Population (31 December 2014)
  - Total: 1,616
  - Density: 27.7/km^{2} (71.7/sq mi)
- Demonym: Stintinesi
- Time zone: UTC+1 (CET)
  - Summer (DST): UTC+2 (CEST)
- Postal code: 07040
- Dialing code: 079
- Patron saint: Beata Vergine della Difesa
- Saint day: 8 September
- Website: Official website

Stintino (Sassarese: Isthintini, Sardinian: Istintìnu) is a coastal comune (municipality) in the Metropolitan City of Sassari in the Italian region Sardinia, located about 200 kilometres (120 mi) north of Cagliari and about 35 kilometres (22 mi) northwest of Sassari.

== Geography ==
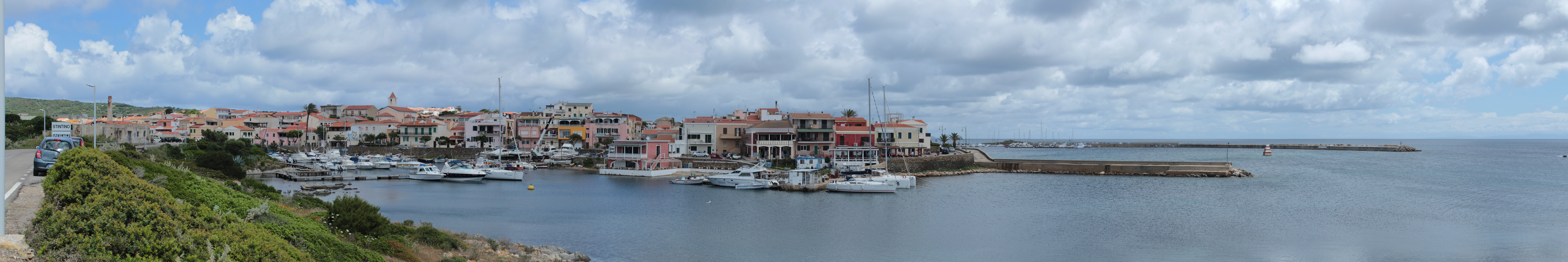
Panorama of the town.

Stintino is located on the peninsula of the same name, running from Nurra plain to the Asinara Island, part of the Asinara National Park, for which Stintino is the nearer embarkment place. The municipality borders with Sassari and its northernmost point, a cape in which is located the town, is in front of the Asinara, which belongs to the municipality of Porto Torres.

== History ==
Stintino was founded on the 14th of August 1885, when the Italian Government decided to use the nearby isle, Isola dell'Asinara, as a quarantine sea aid station and penal colony. This penal colony was then turned into a maximum security prison from 1970 until 1998.

At the time, the isle was inhabited by 45 families, dedicated to agricultural, farming, and fishing activities. These families gave origin to the villages of Cala Reale, Fornelli, and Cala d'Oliva but had had to leave the isle following the decision of the Government

The families used the few resources they were given from the government to create the new comune. A main piazza called 'Piazza dei 45' is named after these 45 original families

== Tourism ==
It is a popular seaside resort and is provided with three tourist ports: Porto Mannu (with 305 boat places), Marina di Stintino (160 boat places) and Porto Minore (110 boat places).

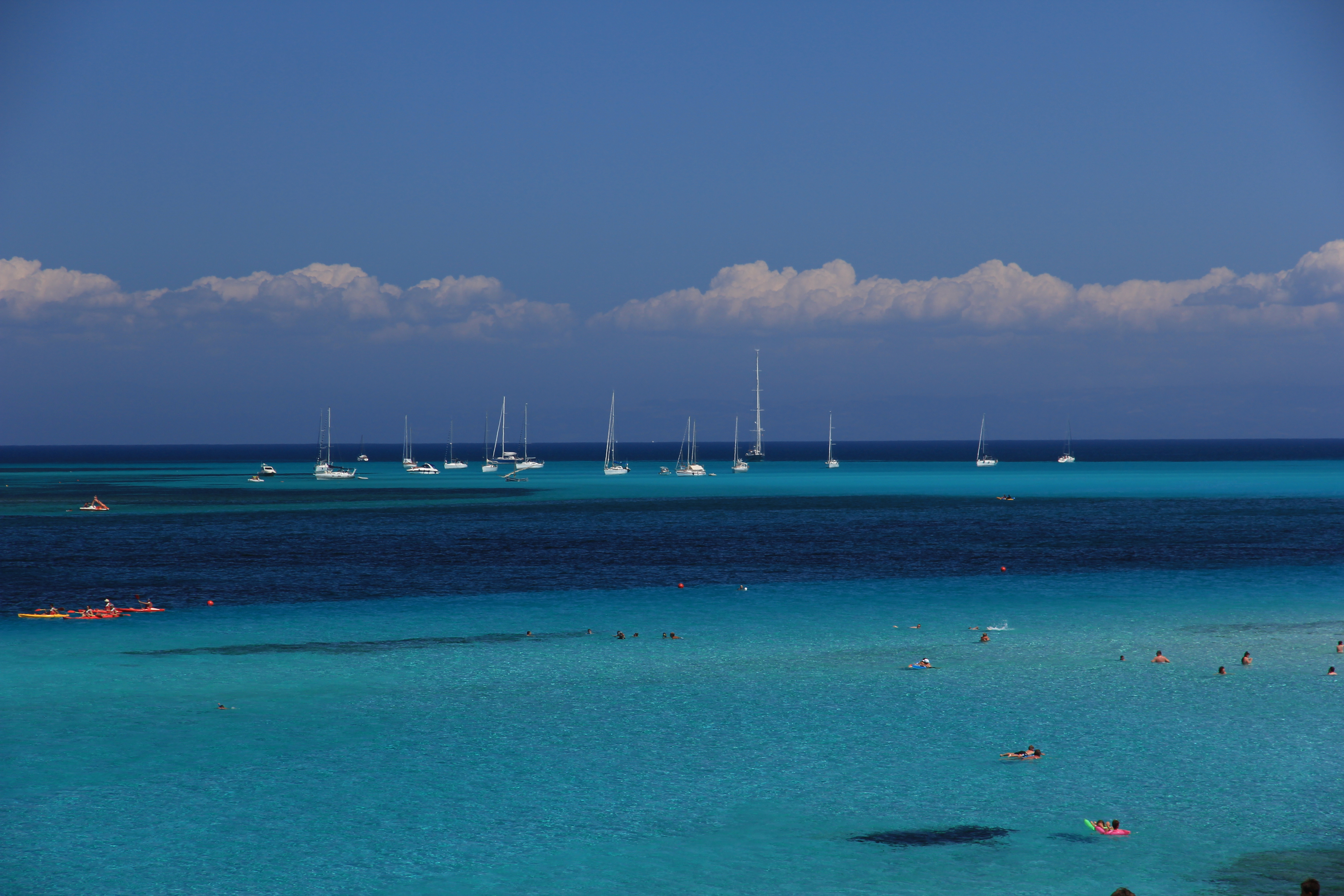
Beach of La Pelosa

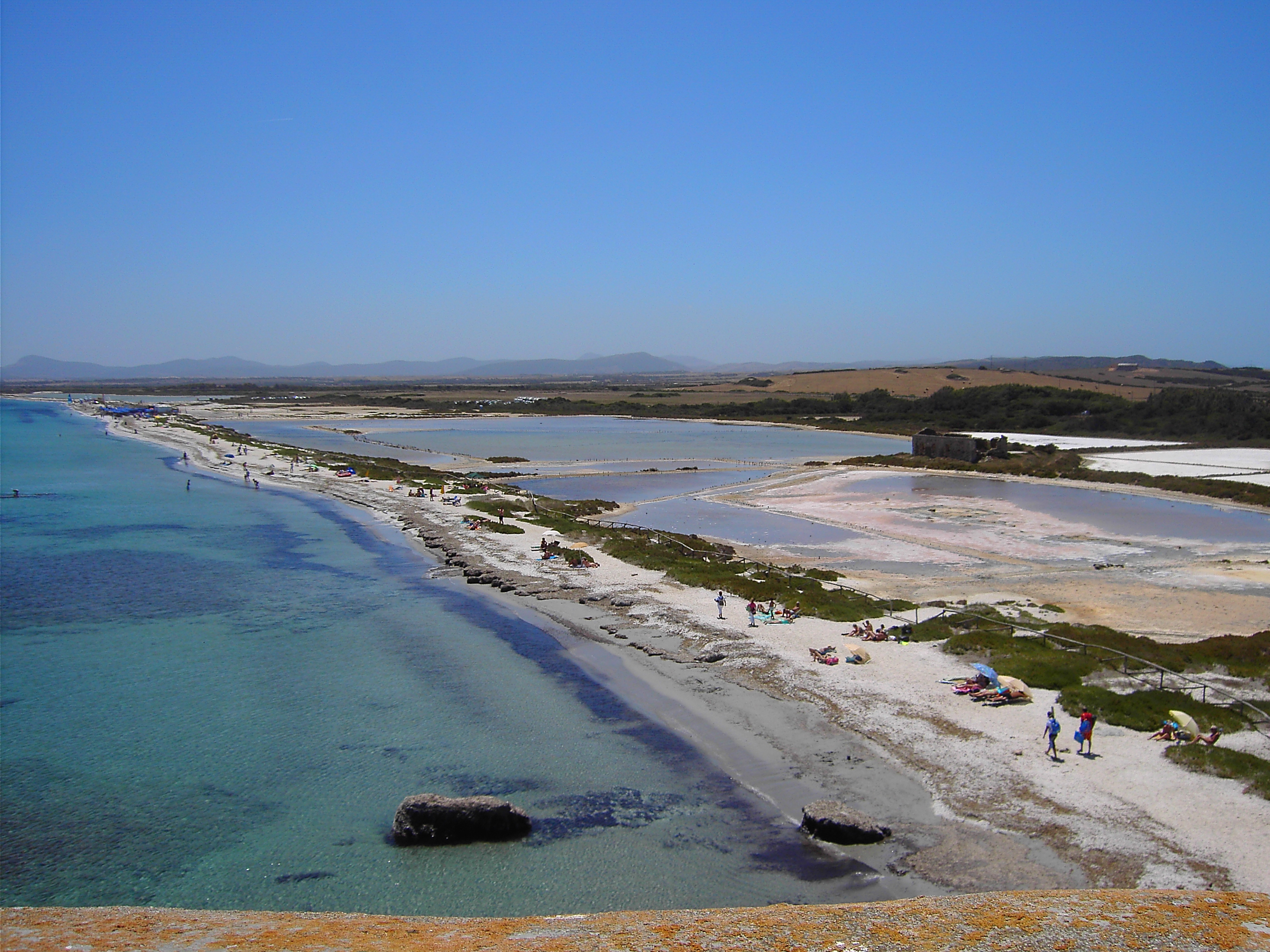
Beach of Le Saline
