= Asinara =

Italian island

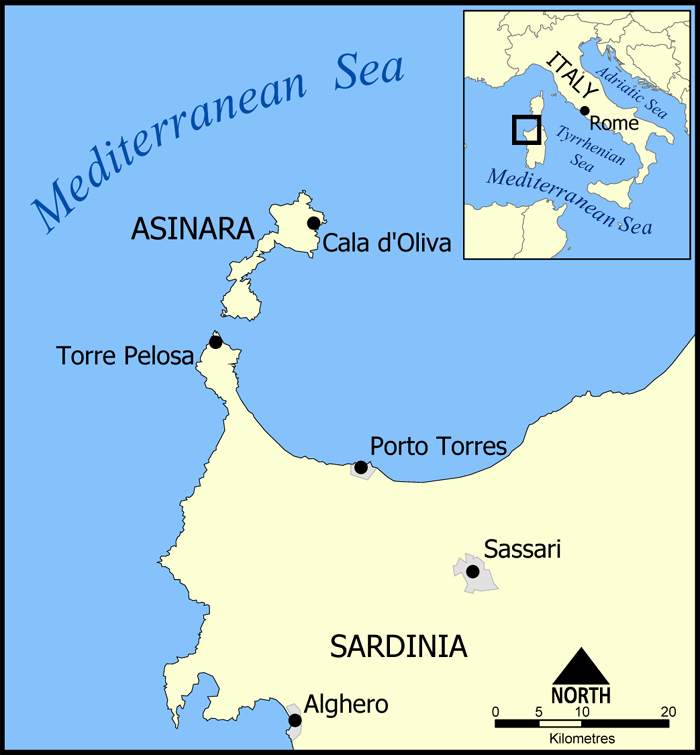
- A map showing the location of Asinara

- Location of Asinara near Sardinia Location of Asinara within Italy

Geography
- Location: Mediterranean Sea, Stintino Capo Falcone in Sardinia
- Coordinates: 41°04′N 8°16′E
- Area: 51.9 km^{2} (20.0 sq mi)
- Length: 17.4 km (10.81 mi)
- Width: 0.29–6.4 km (0.18–3.98 mi)
- Coastline: 100 km (60 mi)
- Highest elevation: 408 m (1339 ft)
- Highest point: Punta Scomunica

Administration
- Italy
- Region: Sardinia
- Province: Province of Sassari
- Commune of: Porto Torres
- Largest settlement: Cala d'Oliva

Demographics
- Population: 1 (2001)
- Ethnic groups: Italian

Additional information
- Northwestern tip of Sardinia

Asinara is an Italian island of 52 km^{2} (20 sq mi) in area. The name is Italian for "donkey-inhabited", but it is thought to derive from the Latin "sinuaria", and meaning sinus-shaped. The island is virtually uninhabited. The census of population of 2001 lists one man. The island is located off the north-western tip of Sardinia, and is mountainous in geography with steep, rocky coasts. Because fresh water is scarce, trees are sparse and low scrub is the predominant vegetation. Part of the national parks system of Italy, the island was recently converted to a wildlife and marine preserve. It is home to a population of wild albino donkeys from which the island may take its name.

== Geography and geology ==
Asinara is located at the north-western tip of Sardinia. It is a territory of 51.9 km^{2} (20.0 sq mi) with a length of 17.4 km (10.8 mi) and a width which ranges from 290 m (951 ft) at Cala di Sgombro to 6.4 km (4.0 mi) of the northern part, as well as 110 km (68 mi) of coast length. The highest point, at 408 m (1,339 ft), is Punta della Scomunica. The territory is entirely state property. The island is formed by four mountainous sections linked by a narrow, flat coastal belt. The windswept west coast is steep and rocky with a very deep sea bottom. The west coast turns down towards the bay of Asinara.

As an extension of the larger island, Asinara is the second largest island after Sant'Antioco. The surface is hilly, covered by thick Mediterranean scrub and few trees, with the exception of a wooded area in the northern part of the island. In the other parts of the island only small trees survive, mostly junipers. The island has an indented coast, as seen from Cape Falcone. The west side of the island is more rocky and steep, while the east has wide, flat areas with a maximum height of 50 m (164 ft). There are only three sandy beaches, all on the eastern coast. As of 2008, 107.32 km^{2} (41 sq mi) of the surrounding marine and underwater environment is a protected natural area. From a geological point of view, the Asinara is part of the Nurra of north-western Sardinia, more than 80 percent made up by of metamorphic rock. The rock characterizes the island landscape, together with the woody vegetation. Among the metamorphic rocks, great interest has attached to rare black Hercynean amphibolites, 950 million years old, the oldest rocks in Italy.

== History ==
=== Early history ===
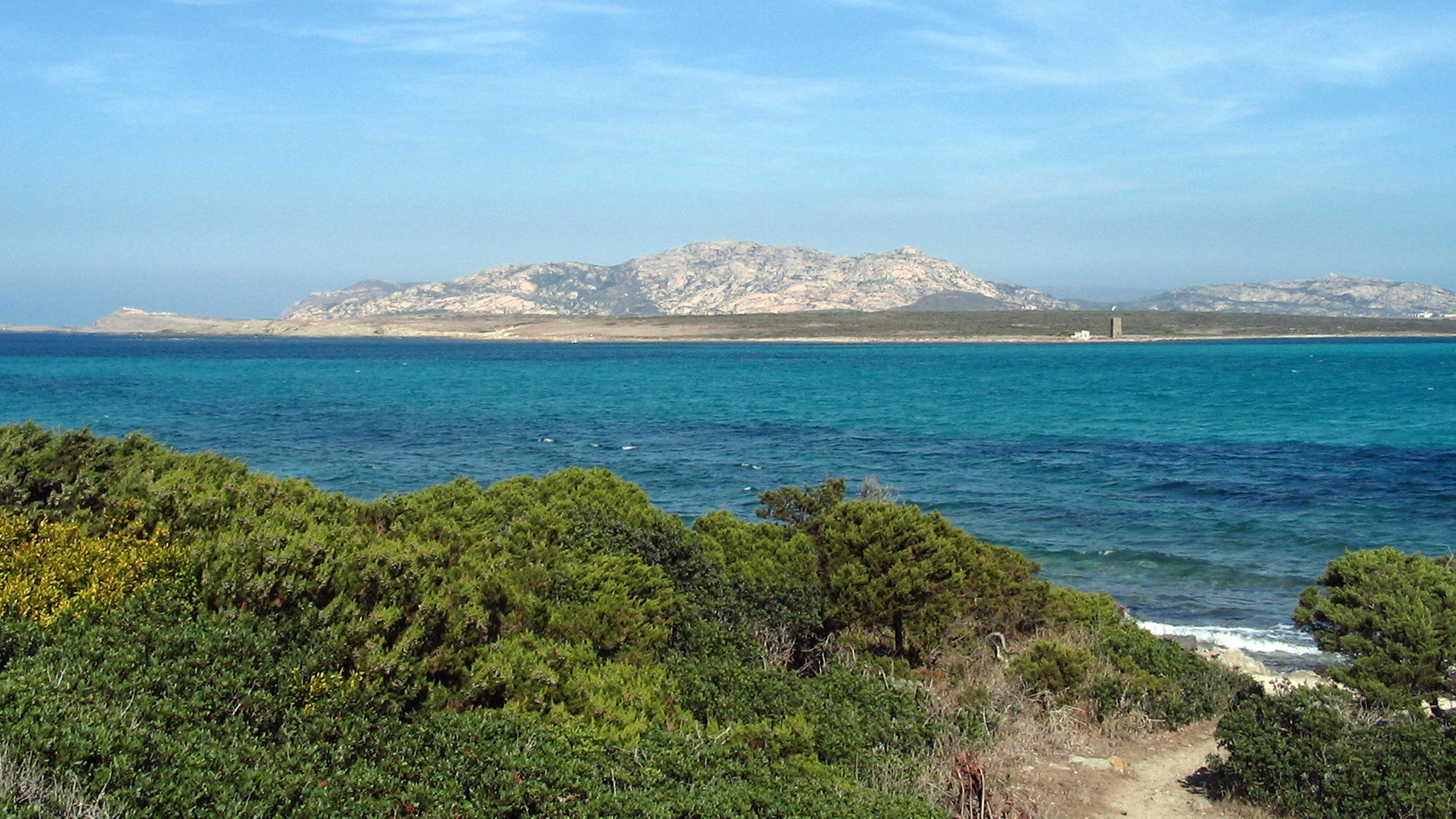
Asinara Island, view from Stintino beach

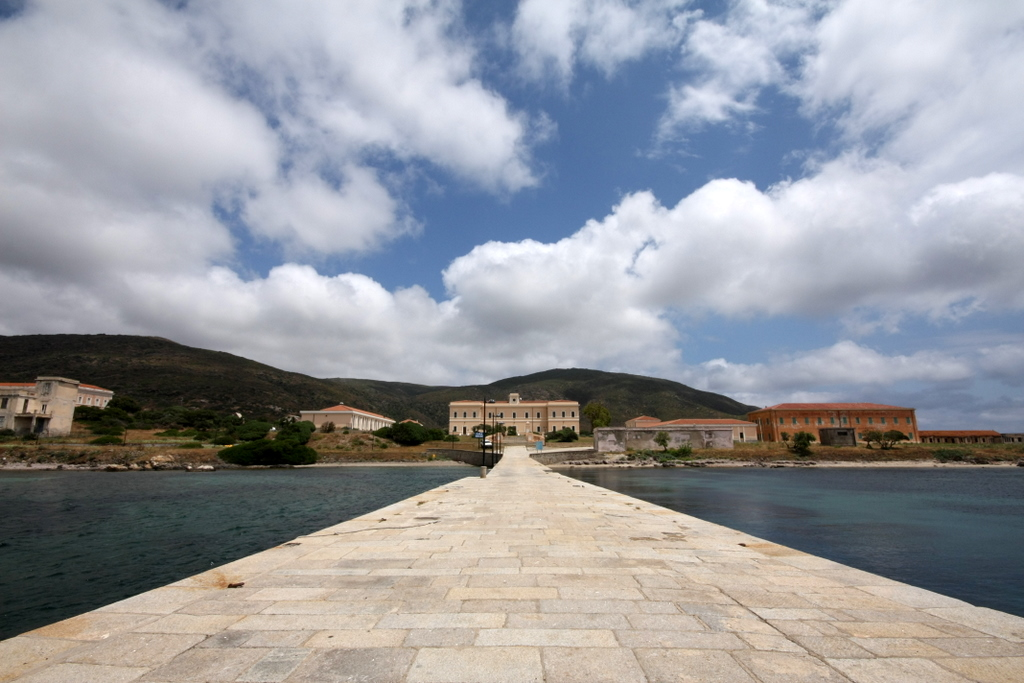
the village of Cala Reale

Human habitation on the island dates back to the Neolithic Age, with Domus de Janas (sprites' houses) near Campu Perdu. Carved into soft limestone, the constructions are unique to the island.

Because of its central position in the Mediterranean, Asinara was known and used by Phoenicians, Greeks, and Romans. The Camaldolite monastery of Sant'Andrea and the Castellaccio on Punta Maestra, Fornelli, may date to the Middle Ages.

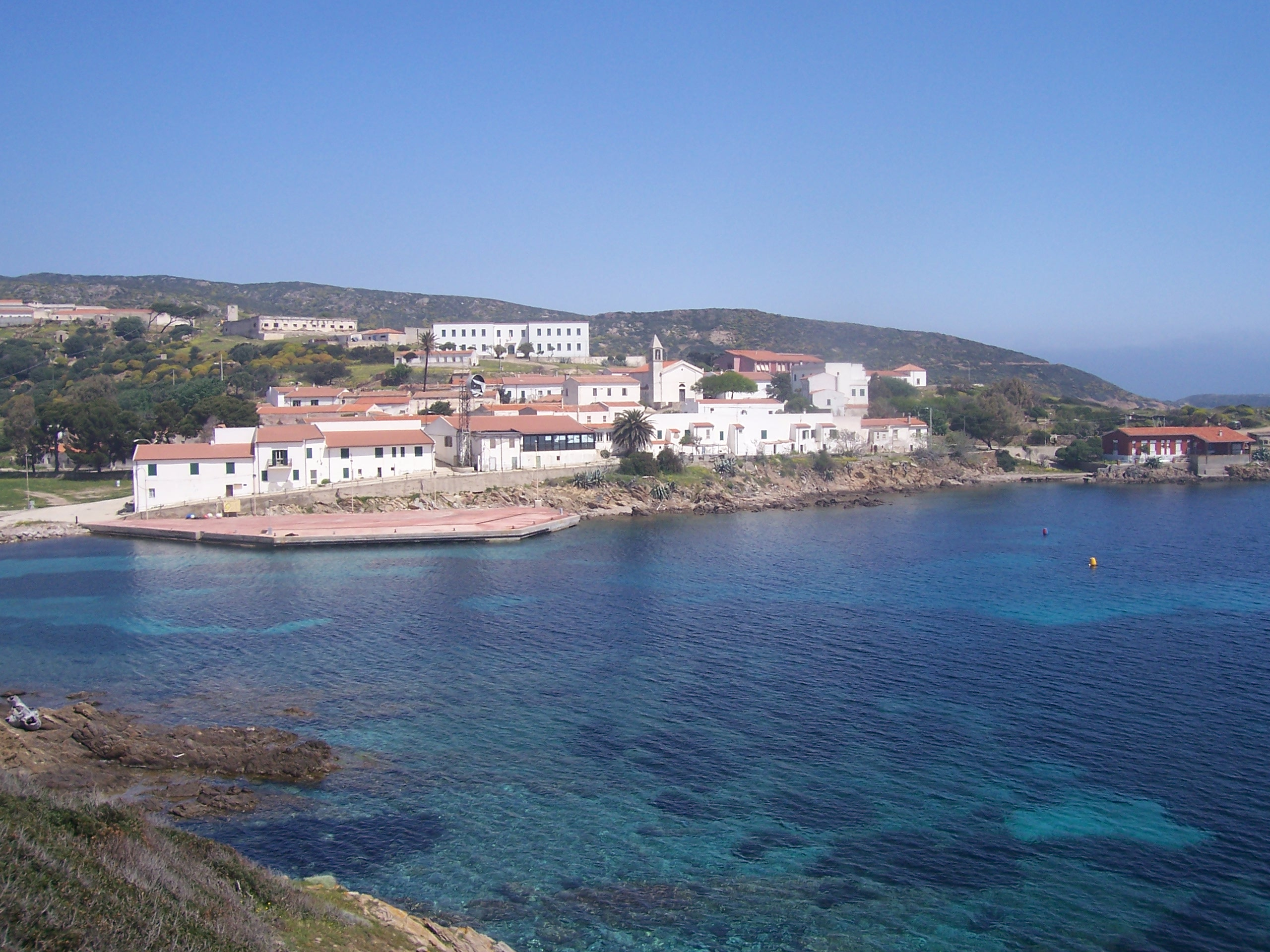
Cala d'Oliva, first village at the time of the prison.

The island was also an object of pirate raids by the Saracens. Later, ownership of Asinara was contested between Pisa, the Republic of Genoa, and the kingdom of Aragon. From the 17th century, shepherds from Sardinia and Liguria colonized the island. In 1721, it became property of the Savoy Kingdom of Sardinia.

In 1885 the island became state property; a lazaretto, the Primario Lazzaretto del Regno d'Italia, was built at Cala Reale and an agricultural penal colony was established at Cala d'Oliva, by order of King Umberto I of Italy. About 100 families of Sardinian farmers and Genoese fishermen who lived on Asinara were obliged to move to Sardinia, where they founded the village of Stintino.

During the First World War, the island was used as a prison camp for some 24,000 Austro-Hungarian soldiers, 5,000 of whom died during their imprisonment. It was used as a place of detention for Ethiopian POWs during the Second Italo-Ethiopian War. The majority of the Ethiopians kept there were members of the Ethiopian nobility.

In the 1970s the prison facilities were refurbished as a maximum security prison. In past years it was assigned mainly to detention of mafia members and terrorists, and it has housed the likes of the mafia boss Totò Riina. Prisoners and warders were the only inhabitants of Asinara for about 110 years, until the prison closed in December 1997.

Construction on the island has been forbidden for the last century.

=== Modern history and the national park ===
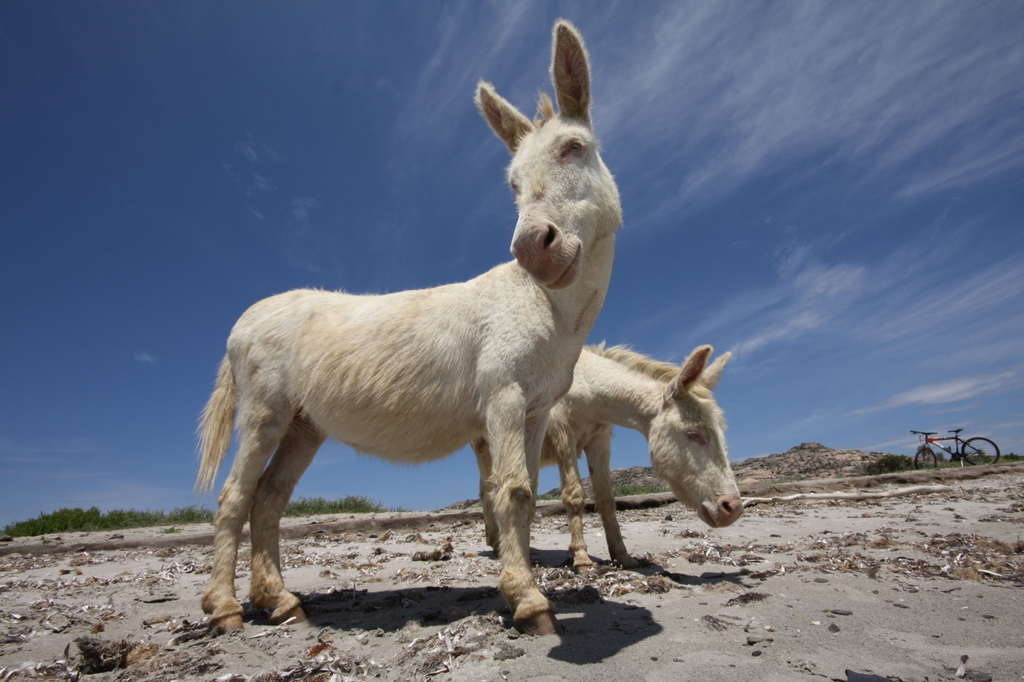
The Albino Donkey for which the island was most likely named.

In 1997 Asinara was established as a National Park, and is now a nature reserve. Its natural beauty, unspoiled by the sparse human settlement, made it an ideal candidate.

Since 1999, tourists have been able to visit Asinara Island, but only through organized and guided tours. Swimming is permitted only on three beaches and docking of private boats is forbidden.

In 2002, the waters offshore of the national park were zoned and designated as Italy's newest marine protected area, encompassing 79 km (49 mi) of coastline around the island and 110 km^{2} (41 sq mi) of its coastal waters. There are two no access, no fishing zones on Asinara Island.

There are many species of native and introduced mammals on the island, including horses, asses, goats, sheep, and pigs. The island's vegetation is a mix of plants native to Sardinia, plants common throughout the Mediterranean, or introduced plants found in other bioregions, including North America. The island also harbors several rarely seen species, including the white Asinara donkey.

There are many old facilities on the island, including the prison facilities, but also small cities built for and by the inhabitants of the quarantine camp, and for the staff that serviced the camp and the prison. All of these have been turned over to the national park, and in tandem the marine protected area, who sorted out what will be kept and with what restoration is needed.

==== Details of protection ====
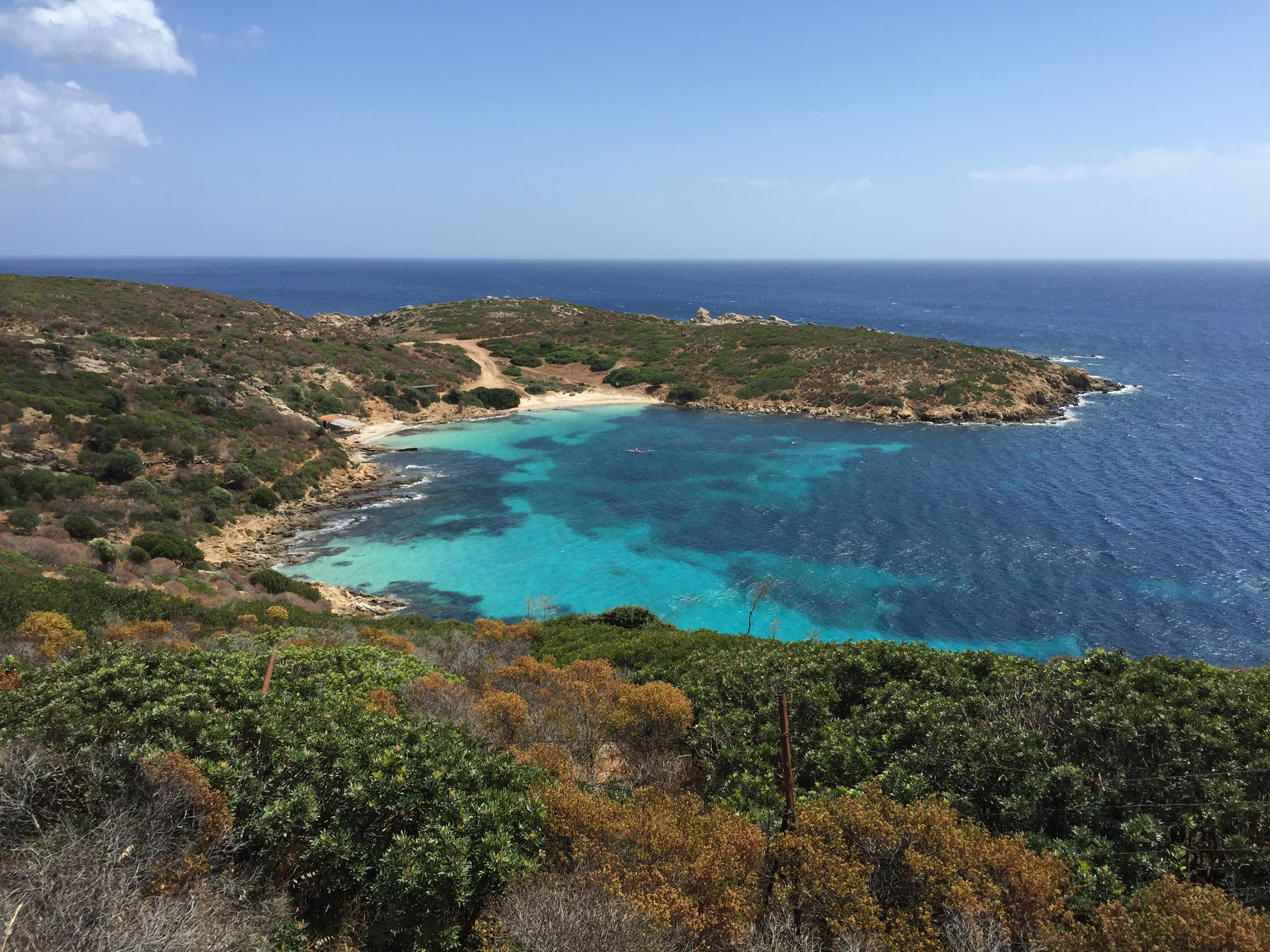
Cala Sabina.

A Presidential Decree, on 3 October 2002, officially set both the Park and the Park body, which is a management body envisioned for national parks by a framework on protected areas. The park body will also manage the Protected Marine Area set by decree of the Minister of the environment and land protection on 13 August 2002. Both the park and the marine area are enclosed in the protected area "international cetacean sanctuary"(Act. 391/01). Asinara is furthermore a Site of Community importance.(on 3 April 2000). There are strict regulations on the island put in place to guarantee the conservation of the marine and land habitats. Institutional decrees (M.D. 28.11.97, M.D. 13.8.02, Presidential Decree 3.10.02), with numerous clauses, include no permission to use own vehicles, prohibition of sport fishing, anchorage and navigation with the exception of authorized means.

== Ecology ==
The vegetation of Asinara is a typical Mediterranean macchia, with lentisk, Euphorbia, tree heath (Erica arborea), Calicotome spinosa, Phillyrea angustifolia, Phoenician juniper and cistus. The flora consists of 678 species, 29 of which are endemic. Some, such as Centaurea horrida, Limonium laetum and Limonium acutifolium, are exclusive to northern Sardinia, while others are characteristic of the Sardinian – Corsican region. The fauna numbers around 80 wild species of terrestrial vertebrates, including mouflon, wild boar, horses, Sardinian donkeys and the white Asinara donkey, which was introduced onto the island at the beginning of the 1800s, and probably abandoned when the inhabitants were moved to Stintino. Birds include the rare Audouin's gull, cormorants, peregrine falcons and the Barbary partridge. Asinara is the only place in Sardinia where the magpie is present.

The marine setting is rocky in the eastern side, with steep slopes and ravines, but mainly sandy in the western area. The shallowest part of the coast is colonized by two rare species, the red alga Lithophyllum lichenoides and the endangered giant limpet Patella ferruginea. The integrity of the ecosystem is due to the history of its settlement, or rather the lack of it, that is a characteristic of the island.

== See also ==
- List of islands of Italy
- Asinara National Park
