= Torre Grande Lighthouse =

Torre Grande
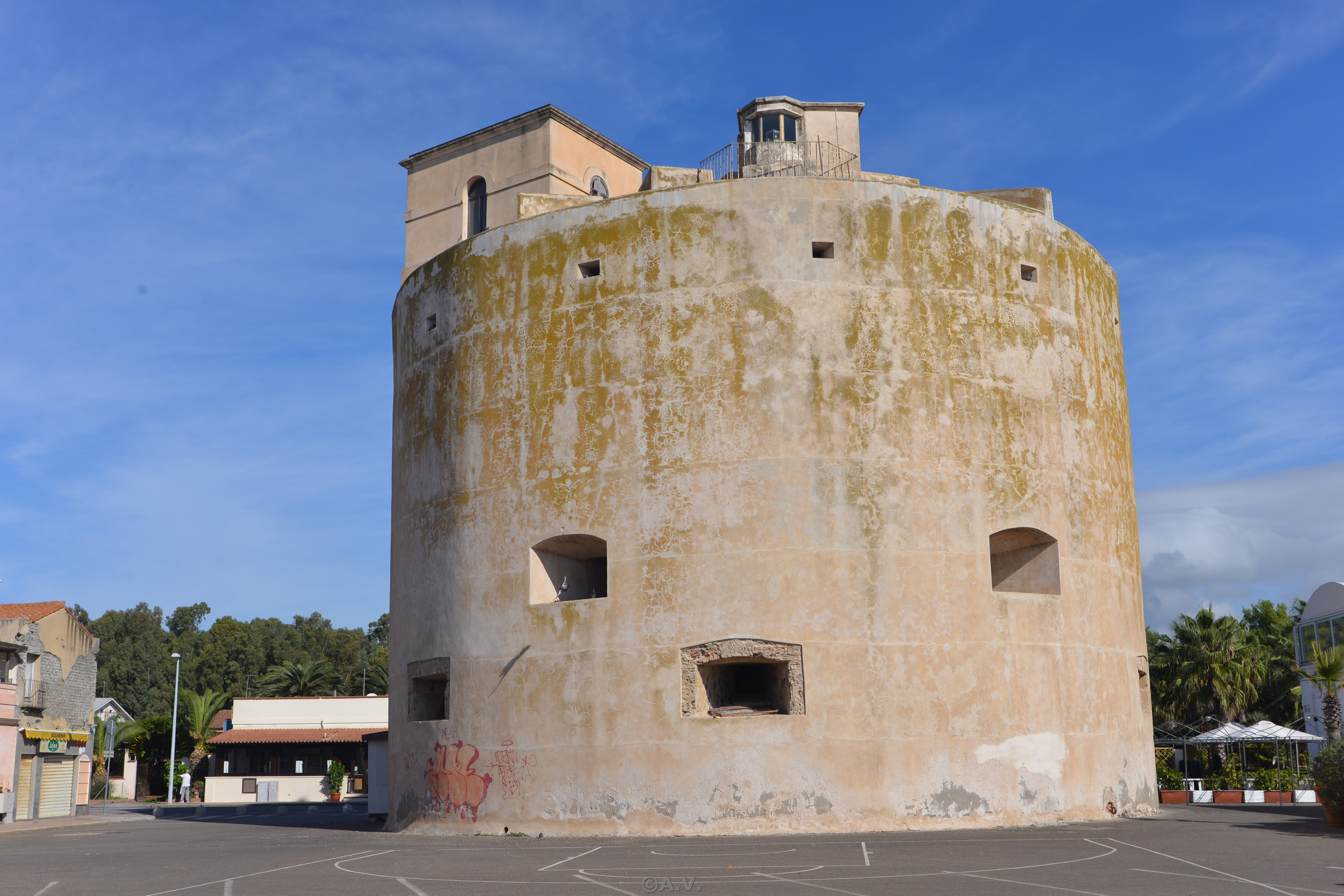
- Torre Grande Lighthouse
- Location: Marina di Torre Grande; Sardinia; Italy
- Coordinates: 39°54′24″N 8°30′58″E

Tower
- Constructed: 1542
- Foundation: stone base
- Construction: stone tower
- Height: 16 metres (52 ft)
- Shape: massive cylindrical tower with lantern atop the roof
- Markings: unpainted stone tower, white lantern
- Power source: mains electricity
- Operator: Coastal and Marine Geomorphology Group and Marina Militare
- Heritage: Italian national heritage
- Fog signal: no

Light
- Focal height: 18 metres (59 ft)
- Lens: Type TD
- Range: 8 nautical miles (15 km; 9.2 mi)
- Characteristic: Fl R 5s.
- Italy no.: 1394 E.F.

Torre Grande Lighthouse (Italian: Faro di Torre Grande) is an active lighthouse located atop a coastal tower on the sea front of Marina di Torre Grande, Sardinia on the Sea of Sardinia.

== Description ==
The construction of the massive tower began in 1542 by the Spaniards on order of Charles V and is considered the largest coastal defensive tower in Sardinia. The tower has a diameter of over 20 metres (66 ft) and it develops on two levels reaching 16 metres (52 ft) in height; the construction went slowly and was completed in 1555. In the 19th century a lantern was placed on the roof of the tower and was built a keeper's house.

The tower is unpainted stone and the lantern is placed inside a room and shown thorough a bay window. The light is positioned at 18 metres (59 ft) above sea level and emits one red flash in a 5 seconds period visible up to a distance of 8 nautical miles (15 km; 9.2 mi). The light is completely automated and managed by the Marina Militare with the identification code number 1394 E.F.; the building is managed by the City of Oristano which transformed it into the Museum of Coastal Towers.

== See also ==
- List of lighthouses in Italy
- Oristano
