= Algherese =

Algherese may refer to:

- Something of, from, or related to the city of Alghero in Sardinia
- The territory of north-western Sardinia, better known as the Riviera del Corallo
- Algherese dialect, a Catalan dialect spoken in Alghero
