= Capo Testa Lighthouse =

Lighthouse in Sardinia, Italy

Capo Testa
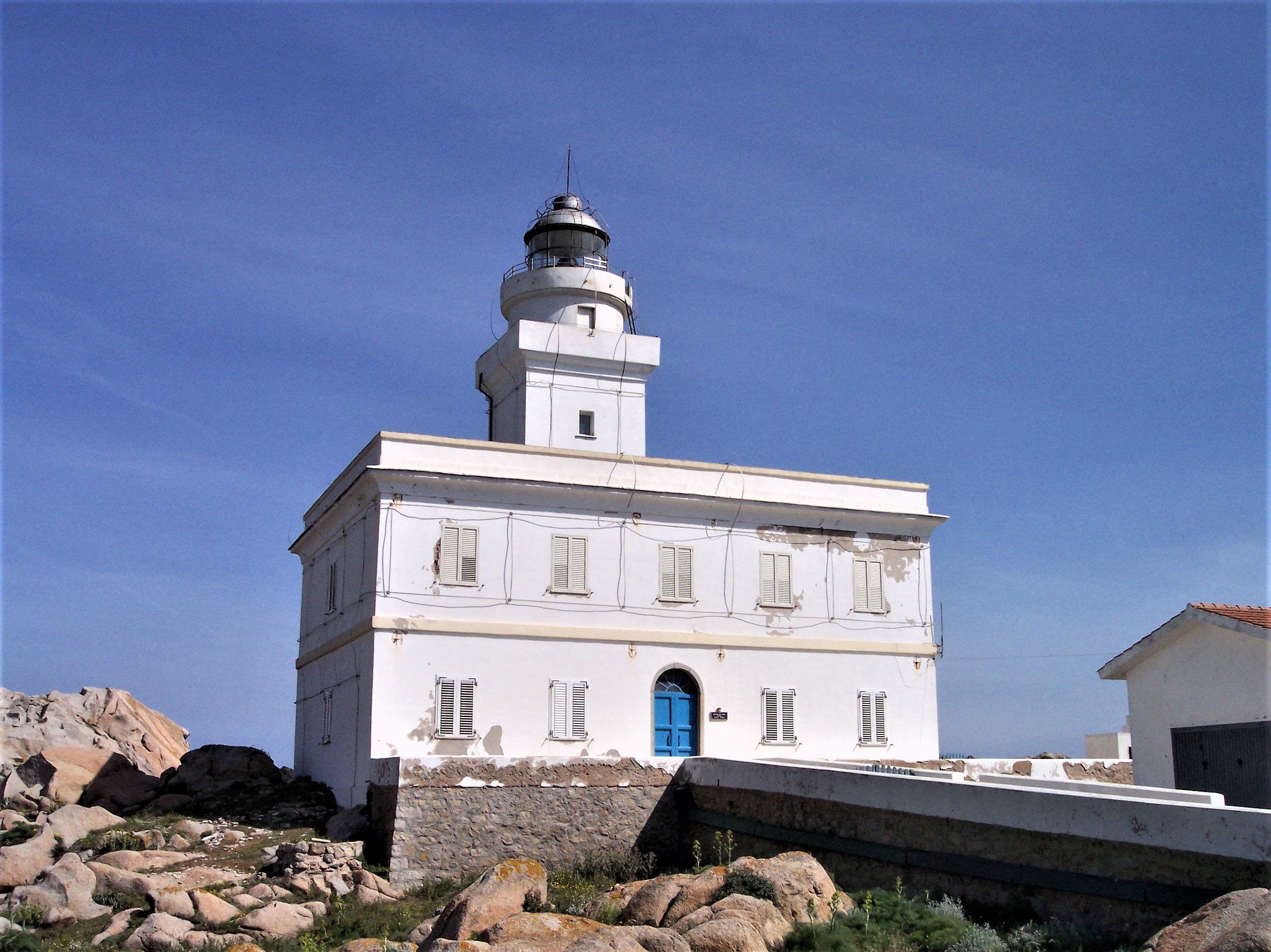
- Capo Testa Lighthouse
- Location: Cape Testa; Santa Teresa Gallura; Sardinia; Italy
- Coordinates: 41°14′38″N 9°08′39″E

Tower
- Constructed: 1845
- Foundation: masonry base
- Construction: masonry tower
- Automated: yes
- Height: 23 metres (75 ft)
- Shape: quadrangular tower with cylindrical watch room, double balcony and lantern atop a 2-storey keeper's house
- Markings: white tower, white lantern, grey metallic lantern dome
- Power source: mains electricity
- Operator: Marina Militare
- Fog signal: no

Light
- Focal height: 67 metres (220 ft)
- Lens: Type OR 250; Focal length: 125mm
- Intensity: main: AL 1000W reserve: LABI 100 W
- Range: main: 22 nautical miles (41 km; 25 mi) reserve: 17 nautical miles (31 km; 20 mi)
- Characteristic: Fl (3) W 12s.
- Italy no.: 1014 E.F.

Capo Testa Lighthouse (Italian: Faro di Capo Testa) is an active lighthouse located on a promontory, which is the northernmost point of Sardinia, and represents the western entrance to the Strait of Bonifacio. Cape Testa promontory is connected to the mainland by an isthmus and the structure is situated in the municipality of Santa Teresa di Gallura on the Sea of Sardinia.

== Description ==
The lighthouse was built in 1845 and consists of a masonry quadrangular tower, 23 metres (75 ft) high, with double balcony and lantern rising from a 2-storey keeper's house. The tower and the building are painted white and the lantern, which mounts a Type OR T3 optics with a Focal length of 125mm, in grey metallic. The light is positioned at 81 metres (266 ft) above sea level and emits three white flashes in a 12-second period visible up to a distance of 22 nautical miles (41 km; 25 mi). The lighthouse is completely automated and managed by the Marina Militare with the identification code number 1014 E.F.

== See also ==
- List of lighthouses in Italy
- Santa Teresa di Gallura
