= Isolotto della Maddalena Lighthouse =

Isolotto della Maddalena
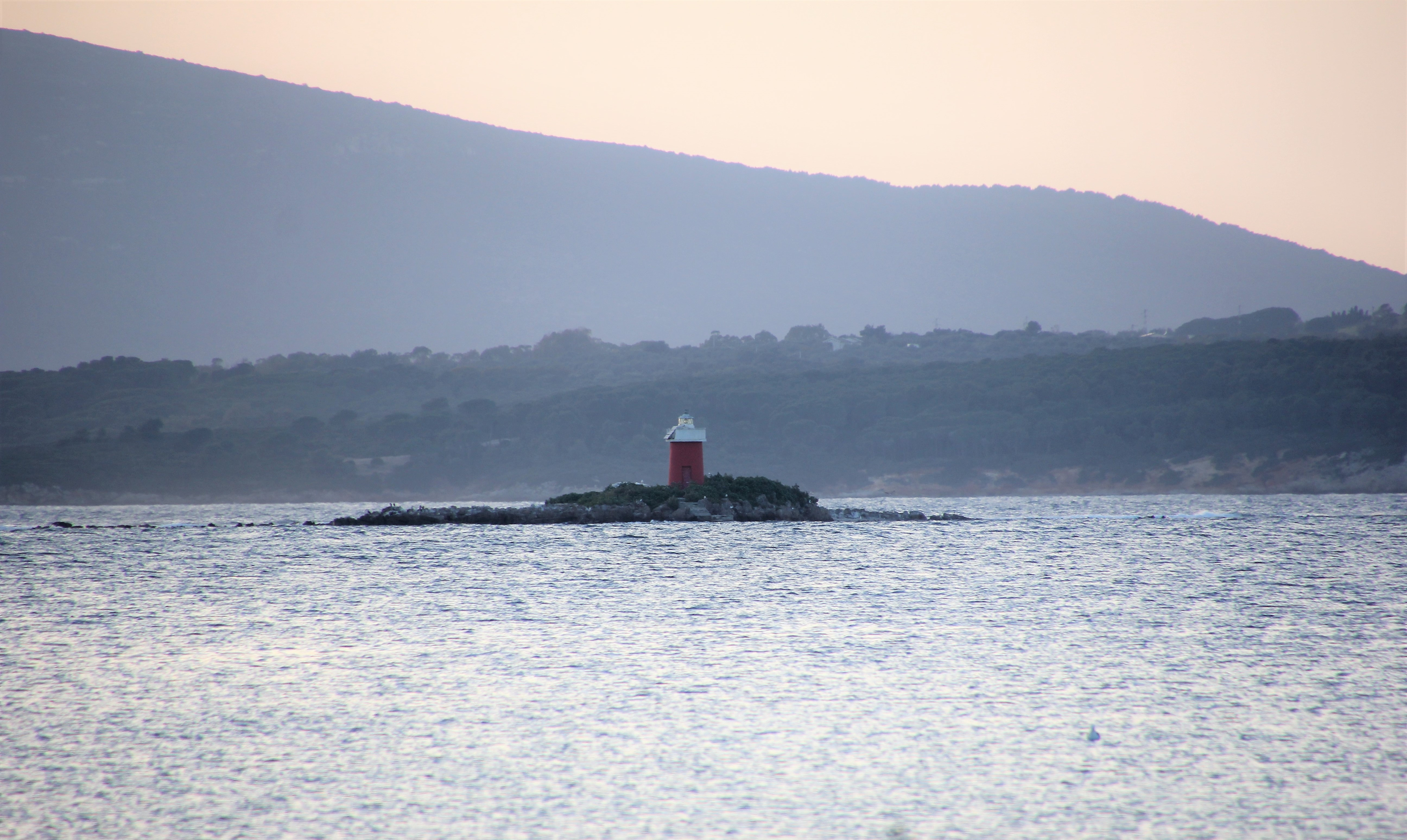
- Isolotto della Maddalena Lighthouse in 2017
- Location: Isolotto della Maddalena; Alghero; Sardinia; Italy
- Coordinates: 40°34′20″N 8°18′01″E

Tower
- Constructed: 1940
- Foundation: concrete base
- Construction: concrete tower
- Height: 6 metres (20 ft)
- Shape: cylindrical tower with balcony and lantern
- Markings: red tower, white balcony and lantern, grey metallic lantern dome
- Power source: solar power
- Operator: Marina Militare
- Fog signal: no

Light
- Focal height: 10 metres (33 ft)
- Lens: Type TD; Focal length: 300mm
- Intensity: MaxiHalo 60-II
- Range: 4 nautical miles (7.4 km; 4.6 mi)
- Characteristic: Fl R 5s.
- Italy no.: 1415 E.F.

Isolotto della Maddalena Lighthouse (Italian: Faro di Isolotto della Maddalena) is an active lighthouse located on a small islet, 84 metres (276 ft) long, placed 800 metres (2,600 ft) north of the south mole of the Port of Alghero on the Sea of Sardinia.

== Description ==
The lighthouse was built in 1940 and consists of a concrete cylindrical tower, 6 metres (20 ft) high, with balcony and lantern; the tower is painted in red, the balcony and the lantern in white and the lantern dome in grey metallic. The light is positioned at 10 metres (33 ft) above sea level and emits one red flash in a 5 seconds period visible up to a distance of 4 nautical miles (7.4 km; 4.6 mi). The lighthouse is completely automated, powered by a solar unit, and managed by the Marina Militare with the identification code number 1415 E.F.

== See also ==
- List of lighthouses in Italy
