= Nereo Cave =

Sea cave in Sardinia, Italy

Grotta di Nereo Nereo Cave
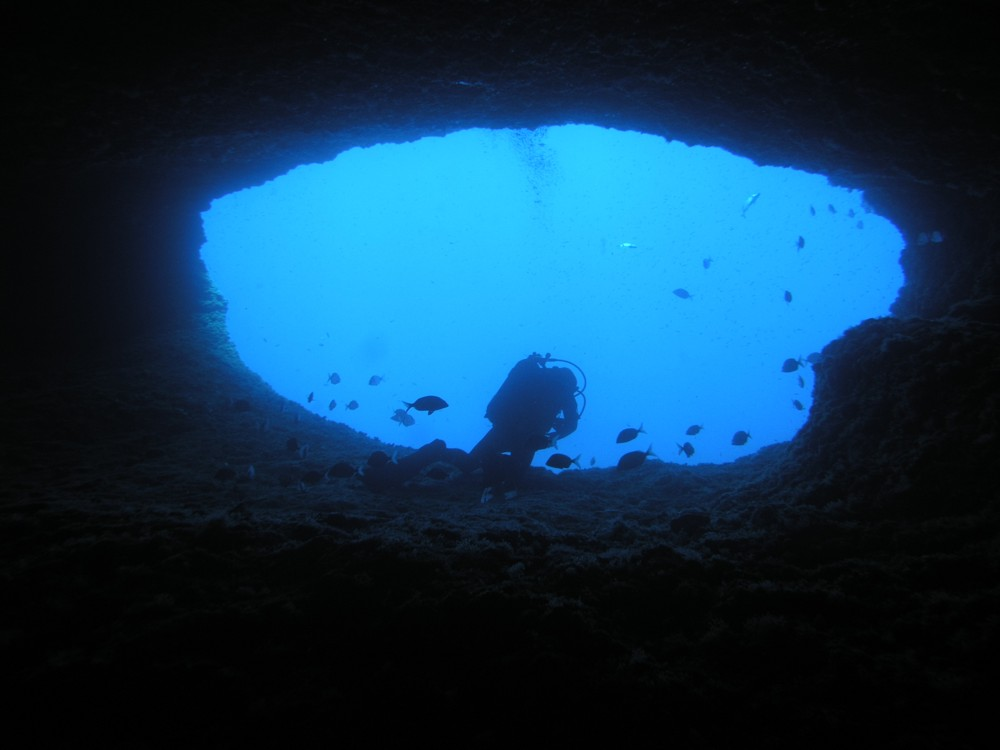
- The "Belvedere" watching terrace, south upside entrance

- Location within Italy
- Location: Capo Caccia, Alghero (SS, Sardinia, Italy)
- Coordinates: 40°33′42.65″N 8°09′40″E
- Depth: 33 m
- Length: 4,000 m
- Elevation: 0 m
- Geology: Sea cave
- Entrances: 1
- Access: Public
- Website: Grotta di Nereo

Nereo Cave (Italian: Grotta di Nereo; Catalan: Cova de Nereu) is a huge underwater sea-cave situated on the north-west of Sardinia in the Coral riviera of Alghero, Italy. The name was given by the discoverers in honour of the mythological figure Nereus, who is often billed as the Old Man of the Sea, father of the Nereids. The site is under the high limestone cliffs of Capo Caccia, 100 metres north of the famous Neptune's Grotto.

== Overview ==
The cave is considered the biggest marine cave in the Mediterranean Sea. With around 10 entrances, arches and tunnels, it is possible to make dives from 0 to 35 m, through long and large tunnels, air chambers and different ways. The walls are covered with red coral and yellow leptosamnia.

With the other cape of Punta Giglio and the Porto Conte Bay, the cave is part of a Marine reserve set up in 2003. Its flora and fauna are typically Mediterranean including groupers, lobsters, congers and moray eels, and thriving crustacean life.

== See also ==
- Cave diving
- List of caves in Italy
