= Battle of Alghero =

1353 naval battle near Sardinia

The Battle of Alghero or Porto Conte was fought on 27 August 1353 at the Bay of Porto Conte, just off the town of Alghero in northwestern Sardinia, between the fleet of the Republic of Genoa and the allied fleet of the Crown of Aragon and the Republic of Venice. The battle was part of the War of the Straits between Genoa and Venice, as well as the Sardinian–Aragonese war, in which Genoa backed Sardinian rebels against Aragonese rule.

== Background ==
Defying Aragonese pretensions to rule over all of Sardinia, on 15 February 1353, the town of Alghero declared its submission to the Republic of Genoa, where the locally powerful Doria family originated from. In response, King Peter IV of Aragon, who had been planning a campaign to consolidate his rule over Sardinia for some time, appointed Bernat II de Cabrera as his captain-general for the Sardinian expedition.

== Battle ==
Cabrera sailed from Mahon in Minorca at the head of a fleet of 46 galleys, 5 cogs and 6 smaller vessels on 18 August 1353, reaching Alghero seven days later. Cabrera arranged for a siege of the city, under the Aragonese governor of Sardinia, Riambau de Cobrera, and sailed south to meet with an allied Venetian fleet of 20 galleys, under Niccolò Pisani, which had arrived at Cagliari to assist the Aragonese. On 27 August, at the Bay of Porto Conte, just off Alghero, the allied Aragonese–Venetian fleet met a Genoese fleet of 50 galleys and 5 cogs under Antonio Grimaldi. The allies inflicted a heavy defeat on the Genoese, capturing two-thirds of the Genoese ships, along with their crews.

Three days later, Alghero surrendered to Cabrera's forces.

== Sources ==
- Dotson, John E. (2002). "Venice, Genoa and Control of the Seas in the Thirteenth and Fourteenth Centuries". In Hattenforf, John B.; Unger, Richard W. (eds.). War at Sea in the Middle Ages and the Renaissance. Woodbridge, Suffolk: Boydell & Brewer. pp. 119–136. ISBN 0-85115-903-6.
- Musarra, Antonio (2020). Il Grifo e il Leone: Genova e Venezia in lotta per il Mediterraneo (in Italian). Bari and Rome: Editori Laterza. ISBN 978-88-581-4072-7.
