= Asinara donkey =

Italian breed of feral donkey

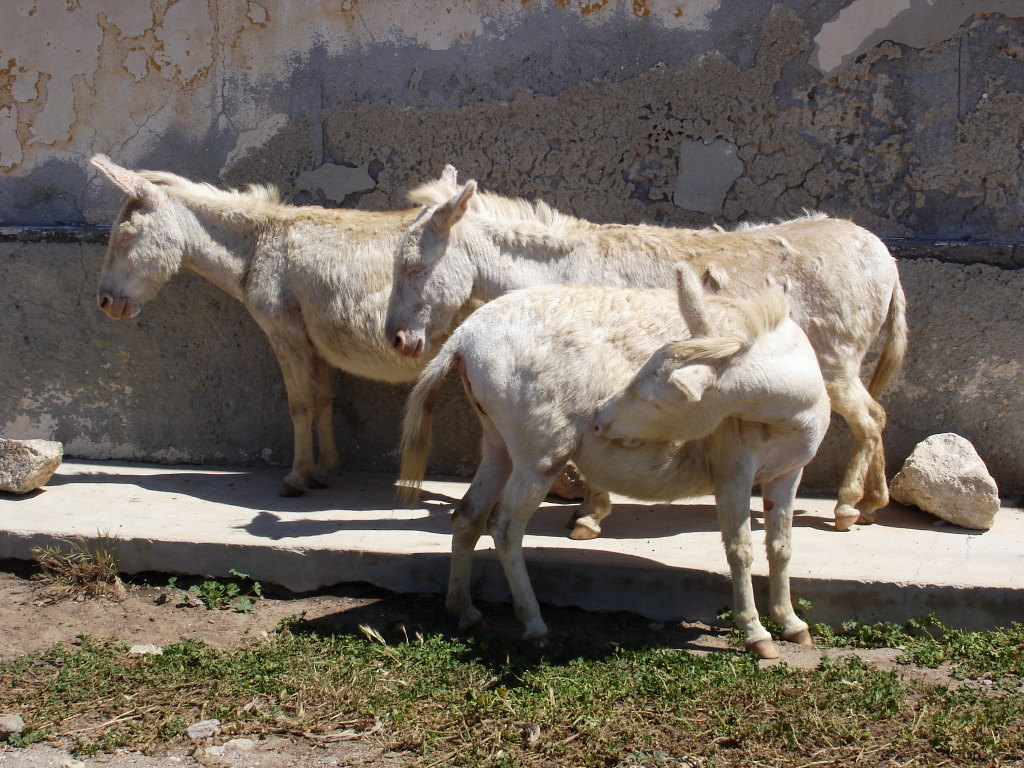
- Asinara donkeys
- Conservation status: FAO (2007): critical; DAD-IS (2021): critical
- Other names: Asino dell'Asinara; ainu; borricu; molenti
- Country of origin: Italy
- Distribution: Asinara; Sardinia
- Standard: MIPAAF

Traits
- Weight: 80–90 kg
- Height: 80–105 cm
- Coat: usually white
- Distinguishing features: predominantly albinistic

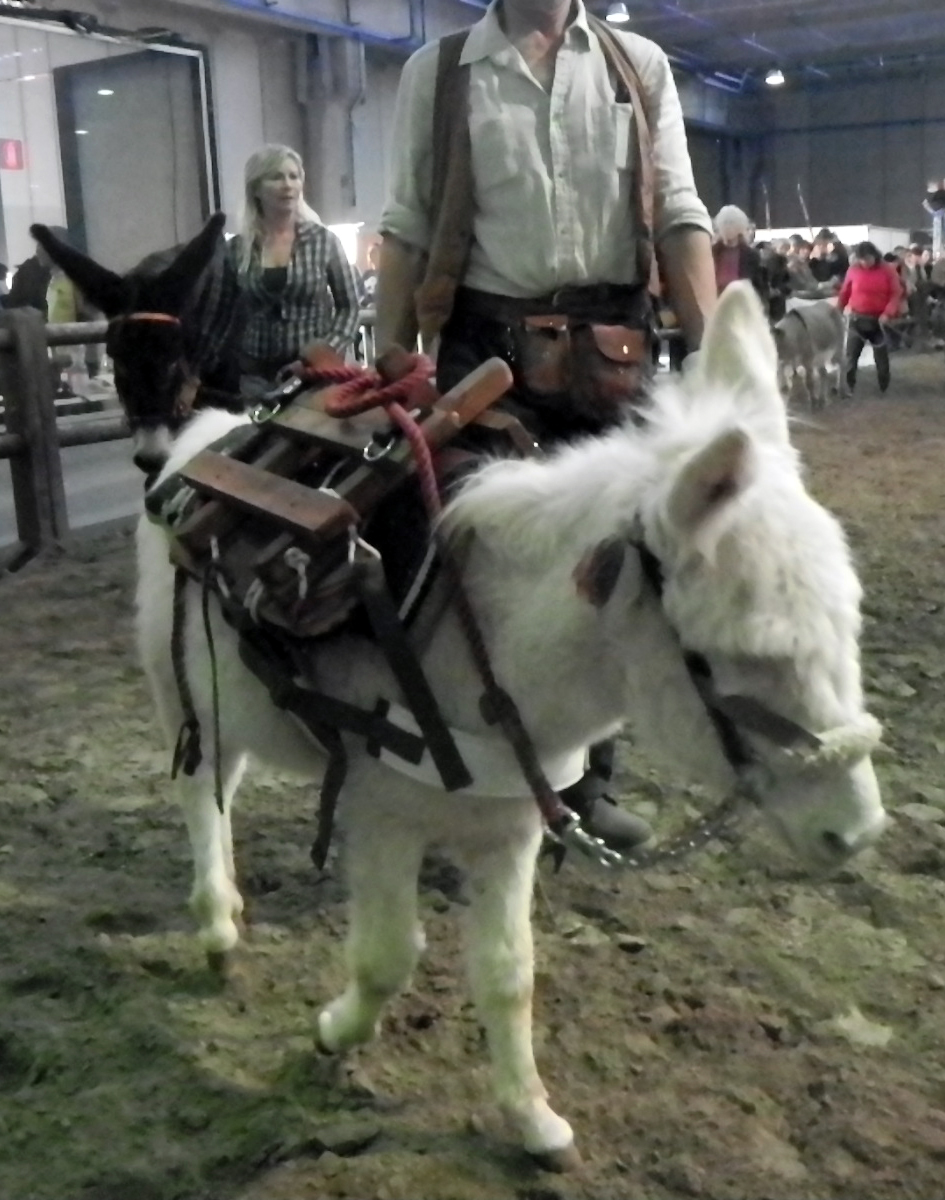
With pack saddle at Fieracavalli, Verona, 2014

The Asinara, Italian: Asino dell'Asinara (Italian pronunciation: [ˈaːzino dellaziˈnaːra]), is a breed of feral donkey indigenous to the island of Asinara, which lies off the north-west coast of Sardinia, Italy, in the province of Sassari. Most of the population is wholly or partly albinistic; the small number of grey donkeys on the island are also considered part of the population, and may be heterozygous carriers of the albino gene. The Asinara is one of the eight autochthonous donkey breeds of limited distribution recognised by the Ministero delle Politiche Agricole Alimentari e Forestali, the Italian ministry of agriculture and forestry. It is called ainu, borricu or molenti in Sardinian.

There are approximately 120 individuals on the island. Others are in the natural reserve of Porto Conte in the comune of Alghero and at the Istituto di Incremento Ippico at Foresta Burgos, and a few are raised in Tuscany and in Emilia Romagna.

== History ==
The Asinara derives from the population of Sardinian donkeys abandoned on the island by the inhabitants when they were forcibly evacuated from it following the passing of the law of 28 June 1885, under which Asinara was to be transformed into a lazaret and penal colony. White-coated animals had already been seen on the island before this event. It is also possible that the breed descends from white donkeys imported from Egypt in the nineteenth century by the Duca dell'Asinara.

Like all Italian breeds of donkey, the Asinara is endangered. Its conservation status was listed as "critical" by the Food and Agriculture Organization of the United Nations in 2007, and was reported to DAD-IS as "critical" in 2021.

A census in 1986 found 31 examples; 59 were counted in 1989, and by the late 1990s the number had reached about 70. In 2008 there were approximately 120 individuals on the island; others were in the natural reserve of Porto Conte in the comune of Alghero and at the Istituto di Incremento Ippico at Foresta Burgos, and a few were in Tuscany and in Emilia Romagna. In 2019 the total breed population was 334. It is one of the eight autochthonous donkey breeds of limited distribution recognised by the Ministero delle Politiche Agricole Alimentari e Forestali, the Italian ministry of agriculture and forestry.

== Characteristics ==
The Asino dell'Asinara is small, standing no more than 105 cm at the withers. A large proportion of the population is albinistic, with a white coat, unpigmented skin and mucosa, and pinkish-blue eyes. The eyes are weak, and the animals shelter from strong sunlight in the disused buildings of the former prison on the island. The hooves are unpigmented and not strong; the gaits are short and uncertain. The albinism occurs in animals homozygous for a missense mutation in the tyrosinase gene.

The grey donkeys on the island are of about the same size, but are considerably more robust. They belong to same feral population, the composition of which has not been affected by direct human intervention for over a hundred years. They can breed freely with the white animals, but are regarded as belonging to the Asino Sardo breed of the island of Sardinia. Only white-coated members of the population are registered as Asino dell'Asinara.

== Use ==
The donkeys are an integral part of the cultural and environmental heritage of the island of Asinara, which since 2002 has been a national park. Their presence may help to reduce the risk of fire.
