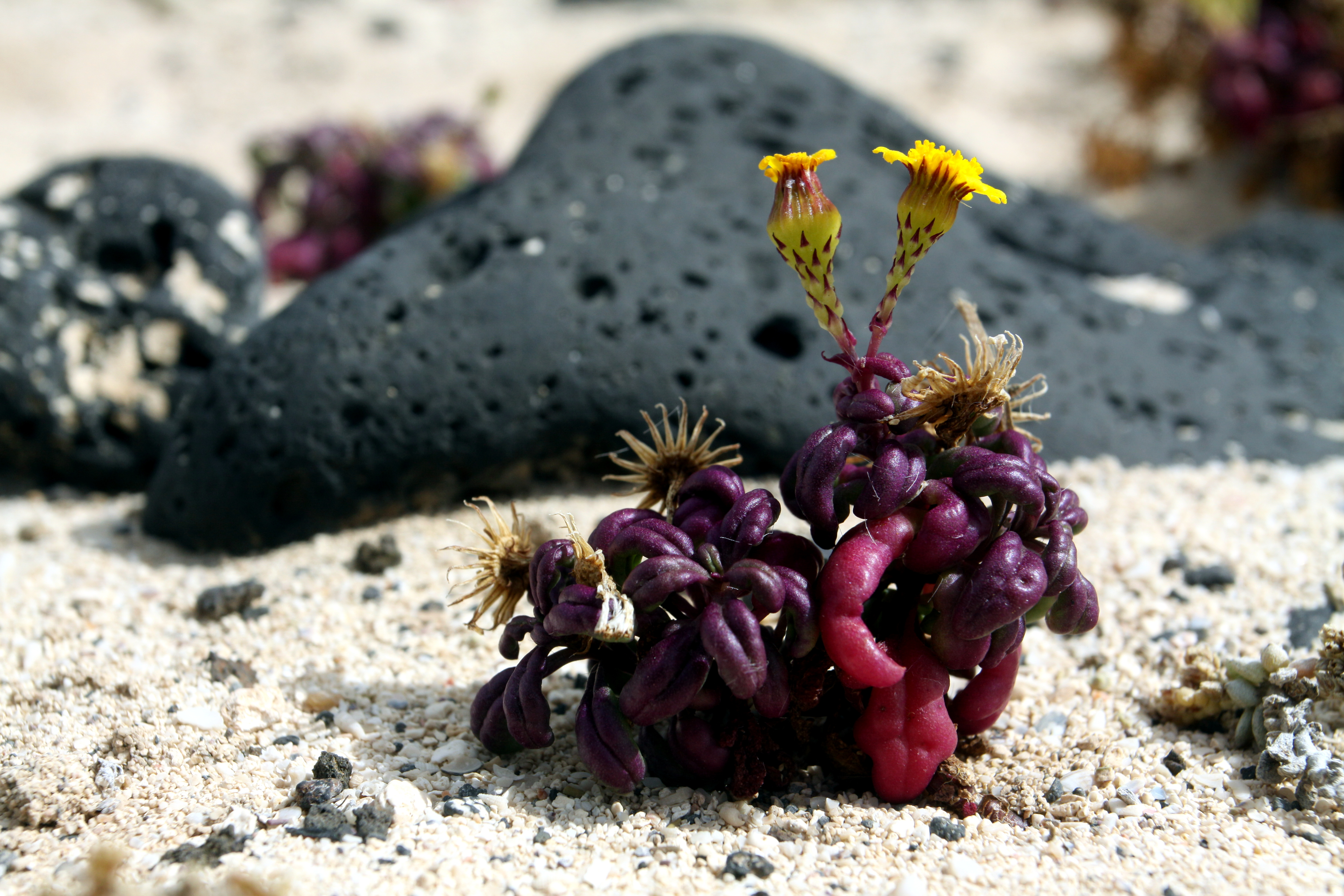

Scientific classification
- Kingdom: Plantae
- Clade: Tracheophytes
- Clade: Angiosperms
- Clade: Eudicots
- Clade: Asterids
- Order: Asterales
- Family: Asteraceae
- Genus: Senecio
- Species: S. leucanthemifolius

Binomial name
- Senecio leucanthemifolius Poir.
- Native range of S. leucanthemifolius.

Synonyms
- Senecio aegadensis C. Brullo & Brullo; Senecio apulus Ten. Senecio caroli-malyi Horvatić; Senecio crassifolius Willd. Senecio humilis Desf. Senecio incrassatus Guss. Senecio marmorae Moris; Senecio pygmaeus DC. Senecio vernus Biv.

= Senecio leucanthemifolius =

Species of flowering plant

Senecio leucanthemifolius is a plant common in sea-side in Mediterranean area.

== Common names ==
- English: Coastal ragwort
- Italian: Senecione costiero, senecione pigmeo
- French: Séneçon à feuilles de Marguerite

== Taxonomy ==
Senecio leucanthemifolius was first described by Jean Louis Marie Poiret in 1789. As of April 2024, the circumscription of the species varied. Euro+Med Plantbase took a wide view, whereas Plants of the World Online (PoWO) split it into a number of species. For example, Euro+Med Plantbase considered Senecio crassifolius Willd. to be a synonym, while Plants of the World Online (PoWO) accepted it as a separate species.

=== Subspecies ===
As of April 2024, the accepted subspecies varied along with the circumscription of the species. Euro+Med Plantbase accepted five:

- Senecio leucanthemifolius subsp. caucasicus (DC.) Greuter (also accepted by PoWO)
- Senecio leucanthemifolius subsp. cyrenaicus (E.A.Durand & Barratte) Greuter (=Senecio cyrenaicus (E.A.Durand & Barratte) Borzì in PoWO)
- Senecio leucanthemifolius subsp. leucanthemifolius
- Senecio leucanthemifolius subsp. mauritanicus (Pomel) Greuter(=Senecio fradinii Pomel in PoWO)
- Senecio leucanthemifolius subsp. vernalis (Waldst. & Kit.) Greuter (=Senecio vernalis Waldst. & Kit. in PoWO)

Plants of the World Online accepted two further subspecies:

- Senecio leucanthemifolius subsp. cossyrensis (Lojac.) C.Brullo & Brullo
- Senecio leucanthemifolius subsp. pectinatus (Guss.) C.Brullo & Brullo

== Distribution ==
When a wide view is taken of the species, its native distribution is:

Palearctic:

Northern Africa: Algeria, Libya, Morocco, Tunisia
Western Asia: Palestine, Jordan, Lebanon, Syria, Turkey - Anatolia
Caucasus: Armenia, Azerbaijan, Georgia
East Europe: Saratov Oblast, Volgograd Oblast, Astrakhan Oblast, Rostov Oblast, Kalmykiya
Middle Europe: Hungary
Southwestern Europe: Balearic Islands, France, Spain
Southeastern Europe: Albania, Bosnia and Herzegovina, Bulgaria, Crete, Crimea, Croatia, Cyprus, Greece, Italy, Malta, Romania, Sardinia, Serbia, Sicily, Ukraine
