= Asinara National Park =

Island national park in Italy

Parco Nazionale dell'Asinara
- IUCN category II (national park)
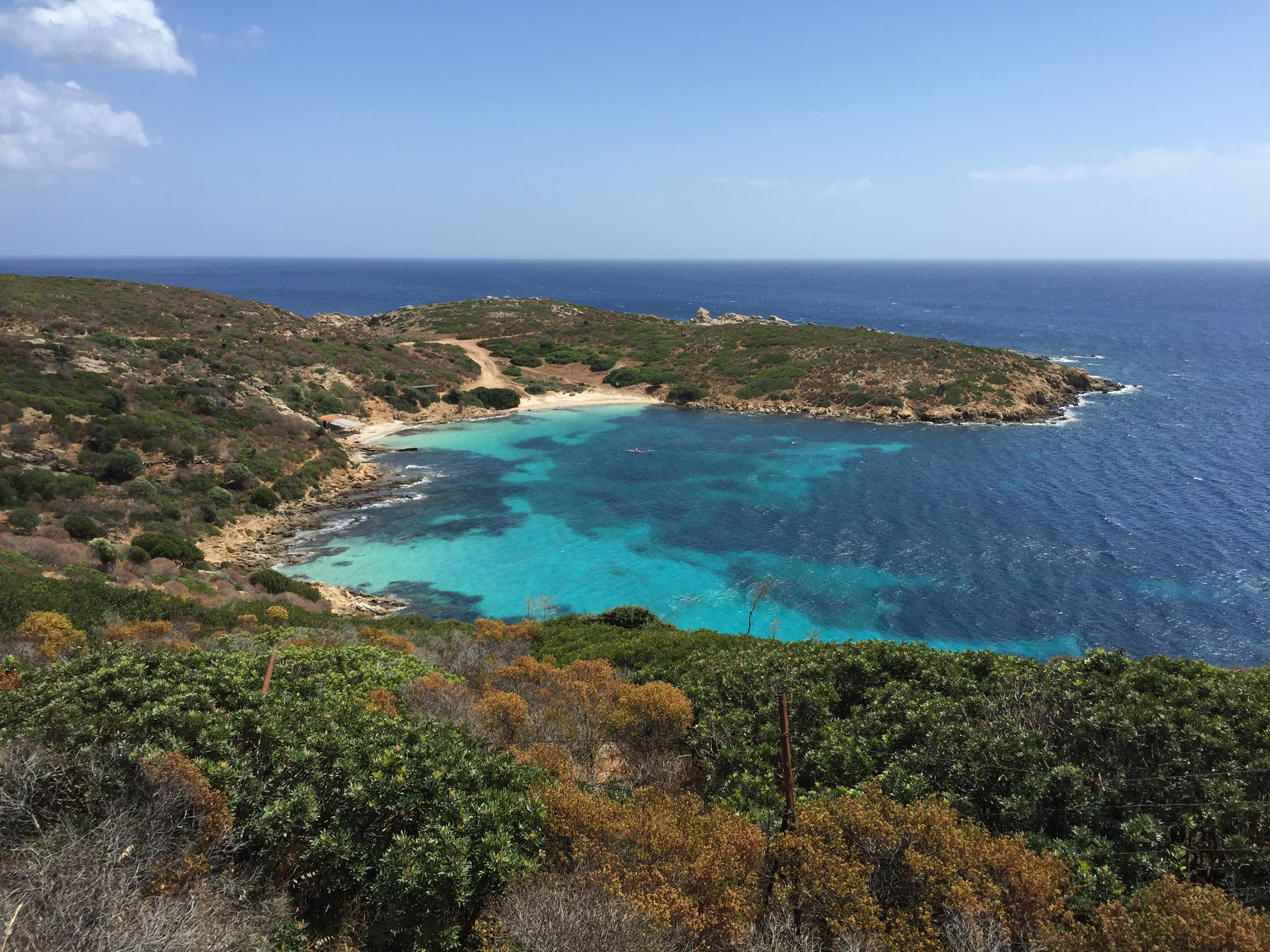
- Cala Sabina, Asinara Island

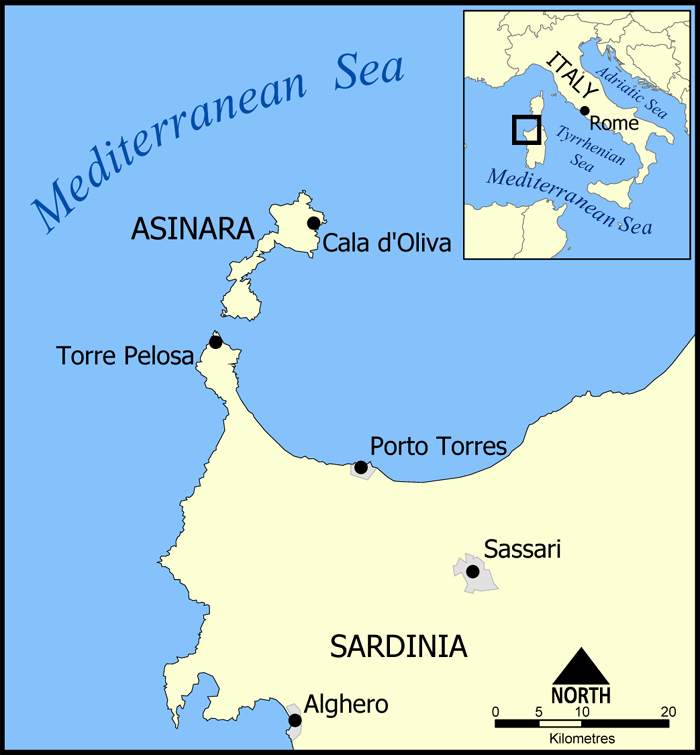
- Map of Asinara Island
- Location: Sardinia
- Nearest city: Porto Torres
- Coordinates: 41°03′29″N 8°16′34″E
- Area: 746.53 km^{2} (288.24 sq mi)
- Governing body: Ministry of the Environment
- Website: www.parcoasinara.org

Asinara is the second largest island of Sardinia after Sant'Antioco. It houses a great variety of habitats. The island has an extremely odd historical, environmental, and legal status. It is known as "Isola del Diavolo" ("Devil's Island"), since it was used as a quarantine location, as a prison camp during the First World War, and as one of the most important Italian high security prisons during the terrorist period of the 1970s and during the struggle against organized crime, until the establishment of a National Park in 1998.

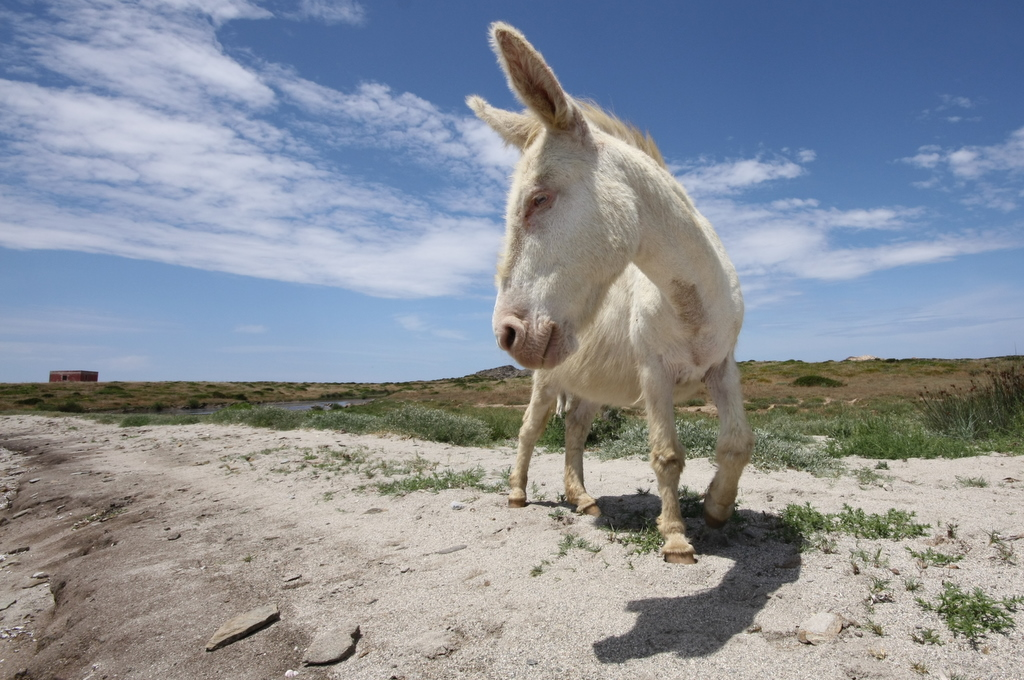
The local albino donkey called asinello bianco

== See also ==
- Asinara
- Porto Torres
