= Bernat II de Cabrera =

Aragonese nobleman (1298–1364)

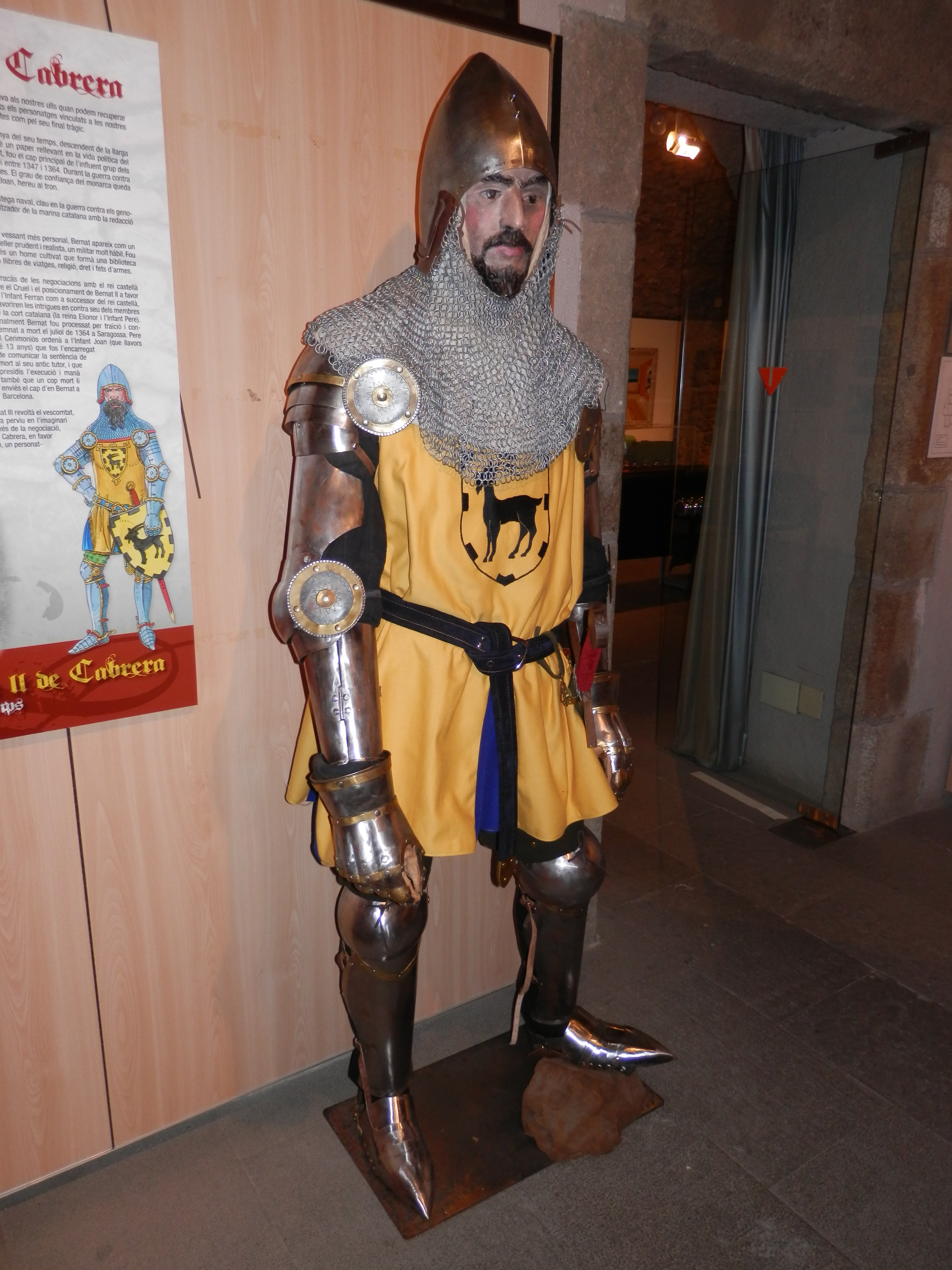
Reproduction of the clothing of Bernat II de Cabrera in the Montseny Ethnological Museum.

Bernat II de Cabrera (Spanish: Bernardo II de Cabrera; 1298–1364) was a Catalan nobleman, diplomat, and military commander. Born in Calatayud, he participated in the conquest of Mallorca (1343). He commanded the fleet that defeated the Genoese navy and took Alghero in 1353.

As the ambassador of Peter IV of Aragon, he negotiated the Peace of Deza between Castile and Aragon on May 18, 1361, during the War of the Two Peters.

The war, however, later continued, and when Cabrera refused to further support Peter's allies Henry of Trastámara and Charles the Bad of Navarre against Pedro of Castile, Cabrera fell into disfavor at court and was executed as a traitor at Zaragoza.
