= Neptune's Grotto =

Cave near Alghero on the island of Sardinia, Italy

Grotta di Nettuno Neptune's Grotto
- Coves de Neptú
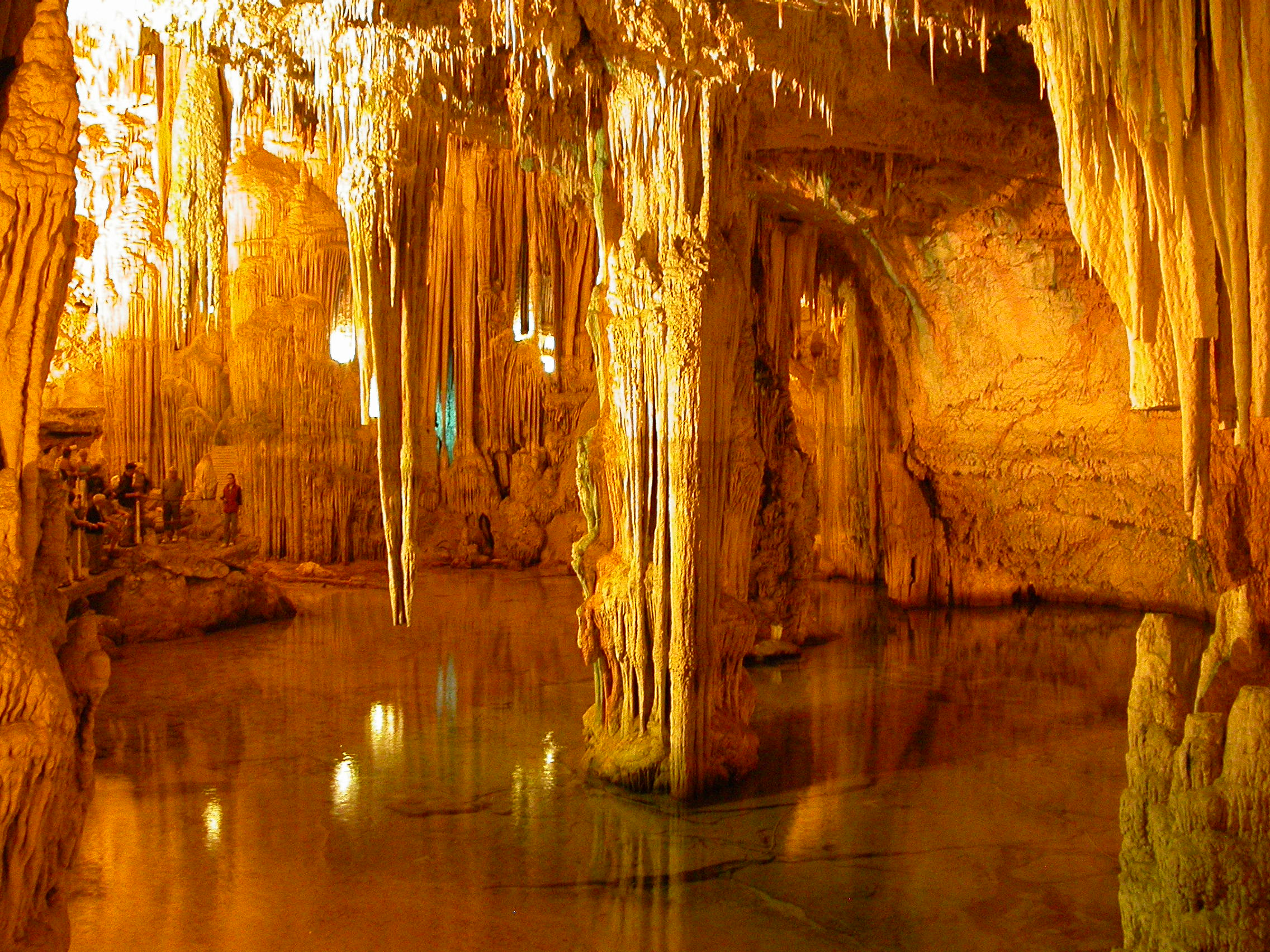
- Inside the cave

- Location within Italy
- Location: Capo Caccia, Alghero (SS, Sardinia, Italy)
- Coordinates: 40°33′53″N 8°09′37″E
- Length: 4,000 m
- Elevation: 5 m
- Geology: Sea cave
- Entrances: 1
- Access: Public
- Show cave opened: 1959
- Show cave length: 500 m
- Website: Grotte di Nettuno

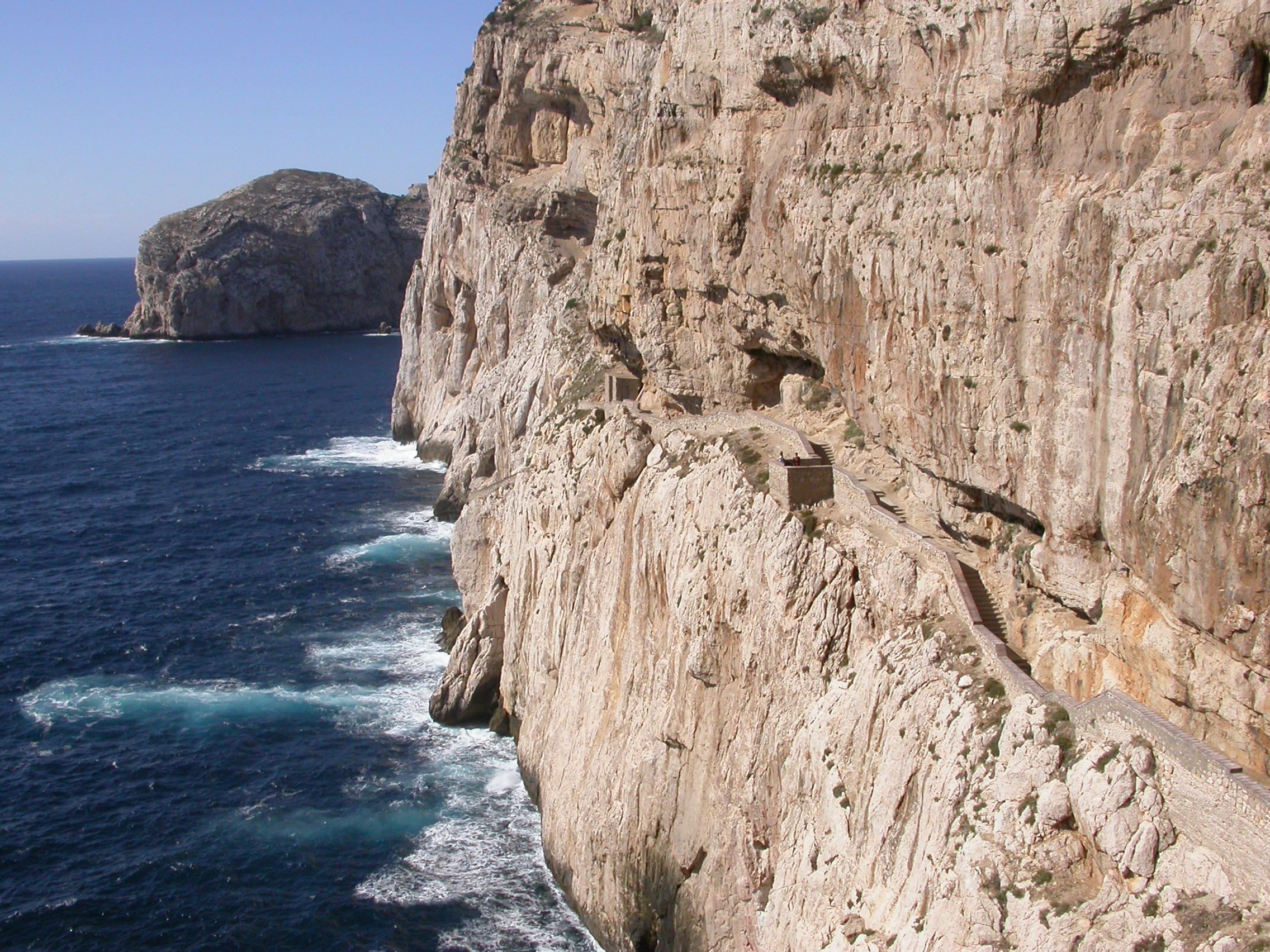
The stairway leading to the cave.

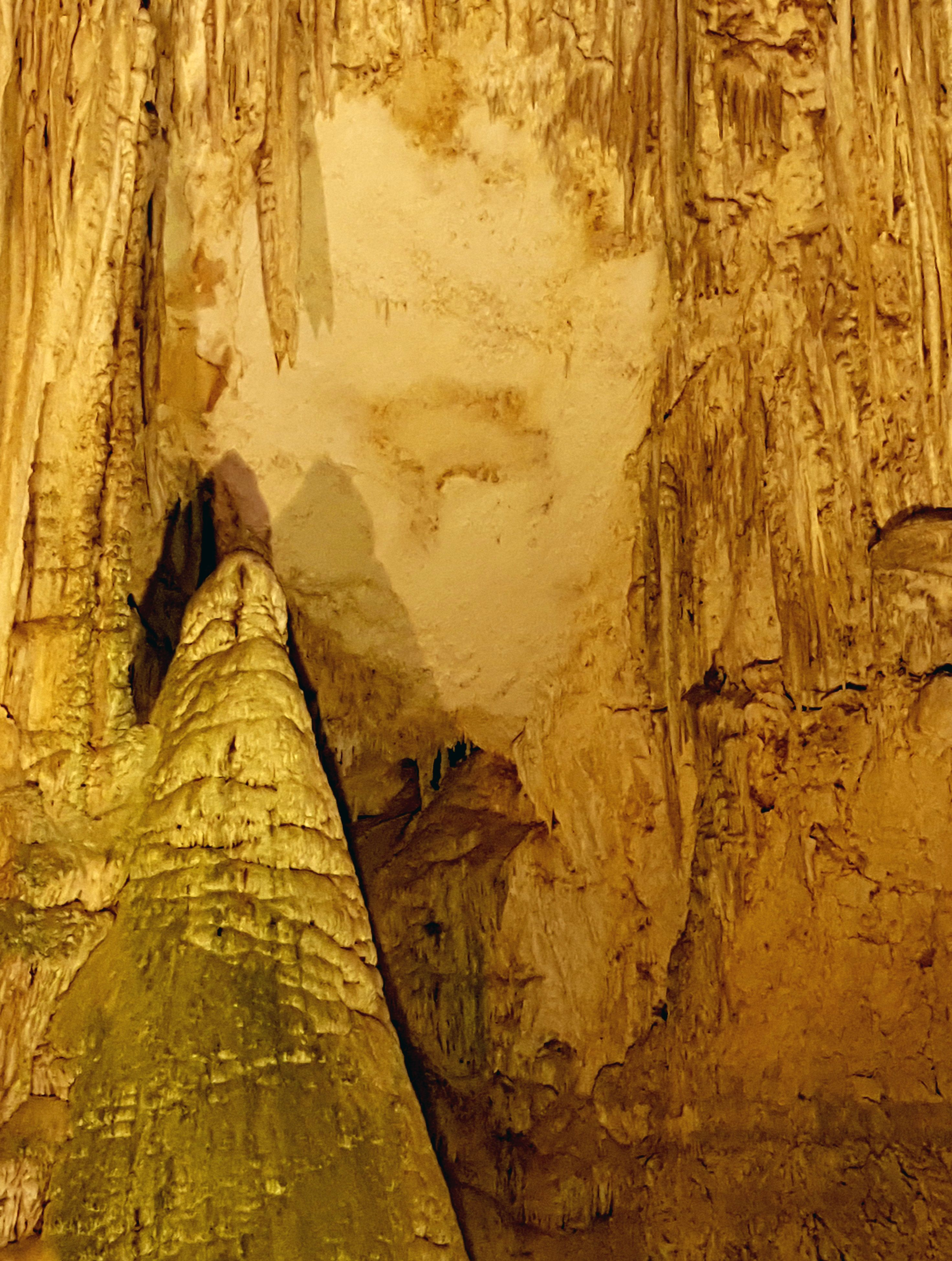
"The Organ Player" - Pareidolia phenomenon in the grotto

Neptune's Grotto (Italian: Grotta di Nettuno; Catalan: Cova de Neptú) is a stalactite cave near the town of Alghero on the island of Sardinia, Italy. The cave was discovered by local fishermen in the 18th century and has since developed into a popular tourist attraction. The grotto gets its name from the Roman god of the sea, Neptune.

== Overview ==
The entrance to the grotto lies only about 1 metre (3 ft 3 in) above sea level at the foot of the 110-metre (360 ft) high Capo Caccia cliffs and the cave can therefore only be visited when the waters below are calm. A stairway cut into the cliff in 1954, the 654-step escala del cabirol (goat's steps), leads from a car park at the top of the cliff down to the entrance. The grotto is also accessible via a short boat trip from the port of Alghero; these trips are arranged hourly during the summer, but less frequently during spring and autumn. Two other grottoes lie nearby, the "Green grotto", which is not open to tourists, and the Grotta di Ricami, which is only accessible from the sea. Under water all around there are many big under water marine caves, paradise for the scuba-diving fans, the bigger and the most famous is the Nereo Cave, visited each year by thousands of scuba divers.

The combined length of the cave system is estimated to be around 4 km (2.5 mi), but only approximately 300 m (1,000 ft) are accessible to the public. Inside are passages of lit stalactite and stalagmite formations, and a 120-metre (390 ft) long saltwater lake, which is at sea level. The cave was once a habitat for the Mediterranean monk seal, which has become extinct in the area.

== Tourism ==
Tourists visiting Neptune's Grotto are given guided tours and led single-file through a lit pathway, with tour guides providing information about the cave in Italian and English. The visit lasts for one hour. The grotto is widely visited, and during the peak tourist season in August, can contain around 200 people at a time.

== In popular culture ==
Neptune's Grotto was the set of the science fiction movie Island of the Fishmen (1979). The movie stars Barbara Bach and Claudio Cassinelli, and it was directed by Sergio Martino. For approximately two months in the summer of 1978, the grotto was transformed into a gigantic set.

== See also ==
- Nereo Cave
- List of caves in Italy
