= Capo Caccia Lighthouse =

Lighthouse in Sardinia, Italy

Far del Cap de Caça Faro di Capo Caccia
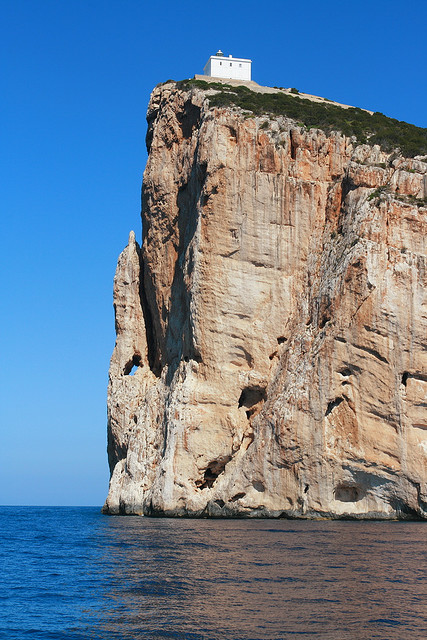
- Capo Caccia lighthouse high on the precipice
- Location: Alghero; Sardinia; Italy
- Coordinates: 40°33′39″N 8°09′46″E

Tower
- Constructed: 1864
- Foundation: masonry base
- Construction: masonry tower
- Automated: yes
- Height: 24 metres (79 ft)
- Shape: cylindrical tower with balcony and lantern rising from one corner of the keeper’s house
- Markings: white tower and keeper’s house
- Power source: mains electricity
- Operator: Marina Militare
- Fog signal: no

Light
- Focal height: 186 metres (610 ft)
- Lens: Type: OR S4; Focal length: 375 mm
- Intensity: main: AL 1000 W LABI 100 W
- Range: main: 24 nautical miles (44 km; 28 mi) reserve: 18 nautical miles (33 km; 21 mi)
- Characteristic: FI W 5s.
- Italy no.: 1418 E.F

Capo Caccia Lighthouse (Algherese Catalan: Far del Cap de Caça, Italian: Faro di Capo Caccia) is an active 19th century lighthouse situated at the extremity of Capo Caccia, 3.7 kilometres (2.3 mi) from Tramariglio a frazione of Alghero on the western coast of Sardinia.

== Description ==
The lighthouse was built in 1864 on the top of the namesake promontory overlooking the sea, just above Neptune's Grotto connected by a staircase of 656 steps named Escala de Cabirol (Staircase of roe). The light station is a three-story white building protected by a Faraday cage to defend from the lightning strikes; above the keeper's house stands the tower 24 metres (79 ft) high, which was rebuilt in 1950s, bringing the focal height to 186 metres (610 ft) making it the highest lighthouse in Italy.

The lantern was supplied by various fuels, including acetylene up to 1880, and then by petroleum gas, until in 1961 the plant was electrified. The rotating optic which was built in Paris by Barbier, Benard, et Turenne in 1951, is equipped with a Fresnel lens, with four deflectors at 90° to each other with a focal distance of 375 millimetres. The lighthouse is active, fully automated, even if staffed by the two keepers who also have the task of maintaining the other lighthouses along the western Sardinia coast. It is operated by Marina Militare identified by the code number 1418 E.F.

== See also ==
- List of lighthouses in Italy
