= Nurra =

Geographical region in the northwest of Sardinia, Italy

Coordinates: 40.8080°N 8.2540°E

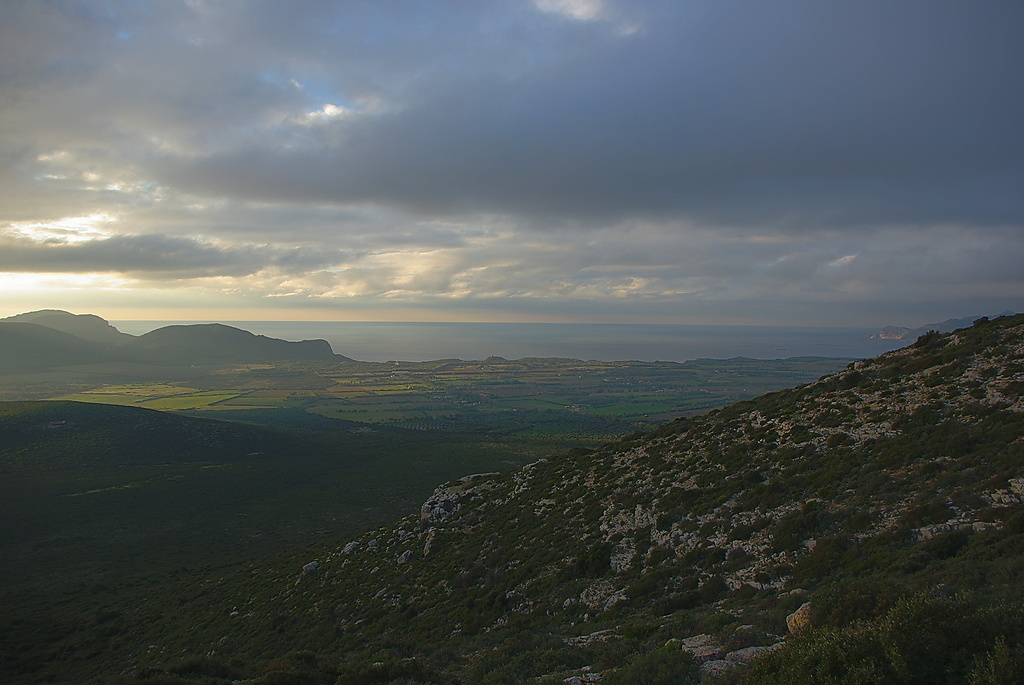
A view of the Nurra near Alghero

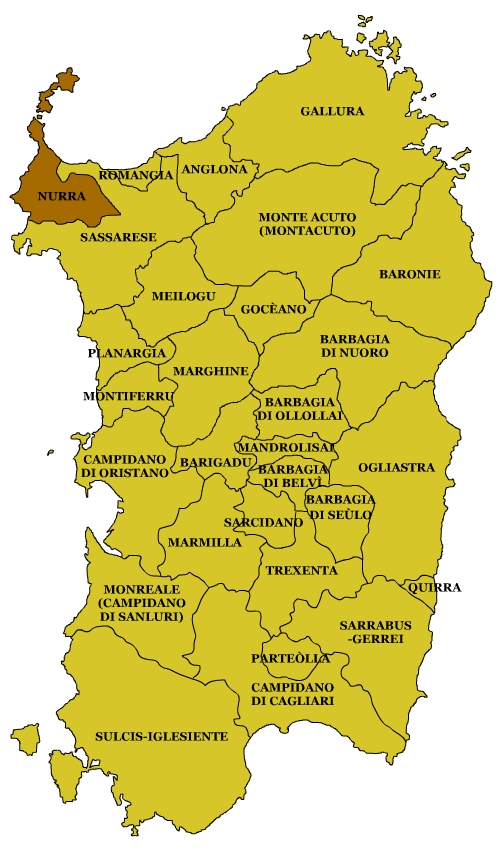
Map of Nurra

The Nurra is a geographical region in the northwest of Sardinia, Italy. It is the second-largest plain of the island, located between the towns of Sassari, Porto Torres and Alghero. It covers a surface of 700 km^{2} and is bounded by the Sardinian Sea on the west and by the Gulf of Asinara on the north.

Nurra was once an important mining center, with Argentiera being the principal village, though today it is a ghost town. The Nurra, before the works of land reclamation initiated under Fascism (which were also continued in after World War II by the ETFAS, Ente Trasformazione Fondiaria Agricola Sarda), and despite being next to one of the most populated areas of Sardinia, has one of the lowest population densities in Italy, with 5 inhabitants per km^{2}, primarily, due to the drought and to the presence of malaria, eliminated only in the 20th century.

== History ==
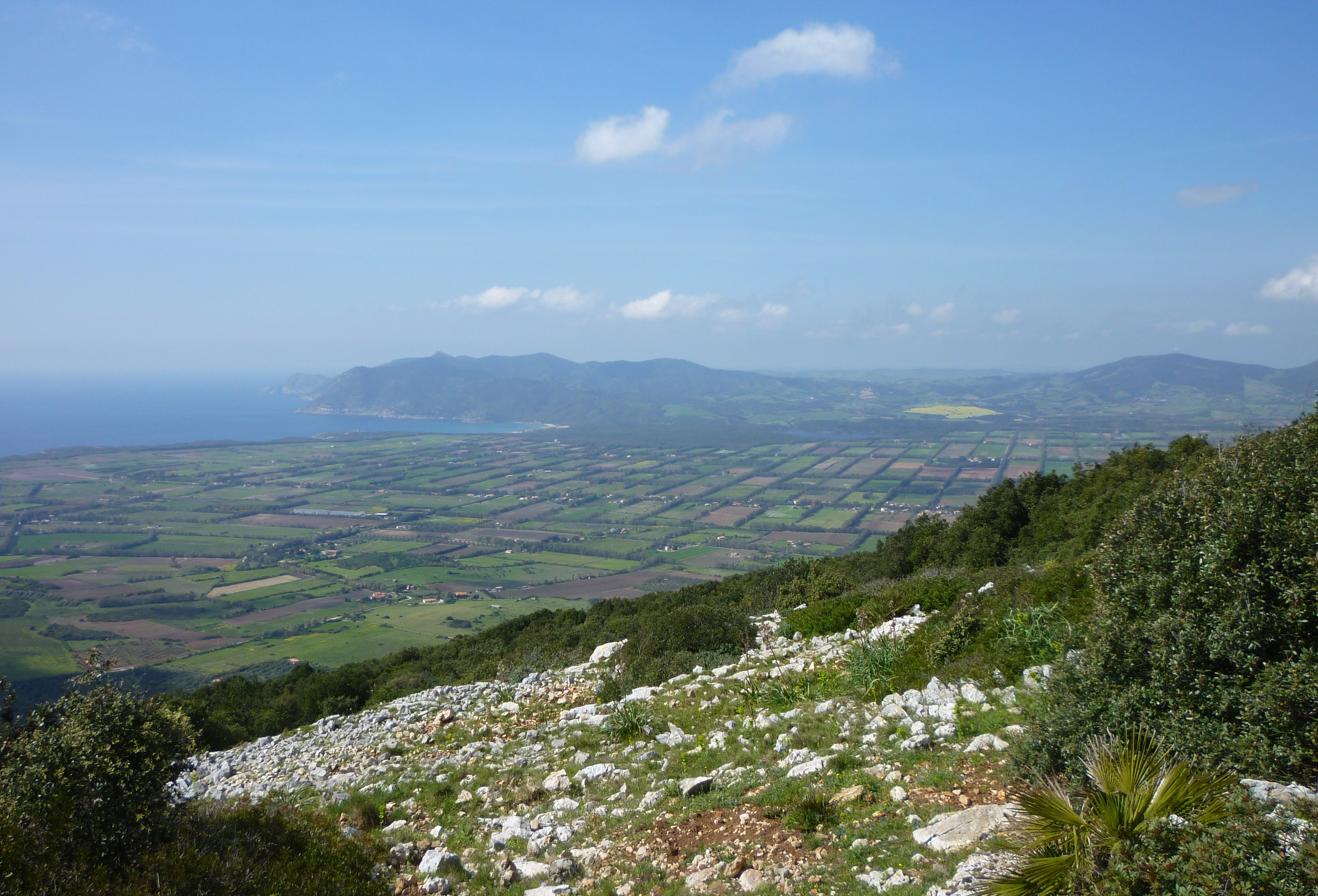
Farmlands in Nurra

In the Middle Ages Nurra was a curatoria in the Giudicato di Torres, rich with salt mills and silver mines. From the 12th century it was owned by the Branca branch of the Doria family of Genoa, who had acquired it at the extinction of the giudicato family and kept it until the end between the Republic of Genoa and the Crown of Aragon in the 14th century. This was depopulated the area, and in 1347 many of the villages were reduced to ghost towns, and the remaining ones suffered equally in the subsequent war between Aragon and the Giudicato of Arborea.

In 1391, it was again invaded by Brancaleone Doria. In 1427, it was formally given to the free commune of Sassari, but was still subject to raids from North-African corsairs.

== Heritage ==
There is an example of industrial archaeology included in the Geological-Mining Park of Sardinia and preserved by UNESCO.

== Economy ==
Today economy is based on agriculture, animal husbandry and tourism.

== Sources ==
- Francesco Floris, ed. (2007). La grande Enciclopedia della Sardegna. Sassari: Biblioteca della Nuova Sardegna.
