= Sea of Sardinia =

Body of water in the Mediterranean Sea

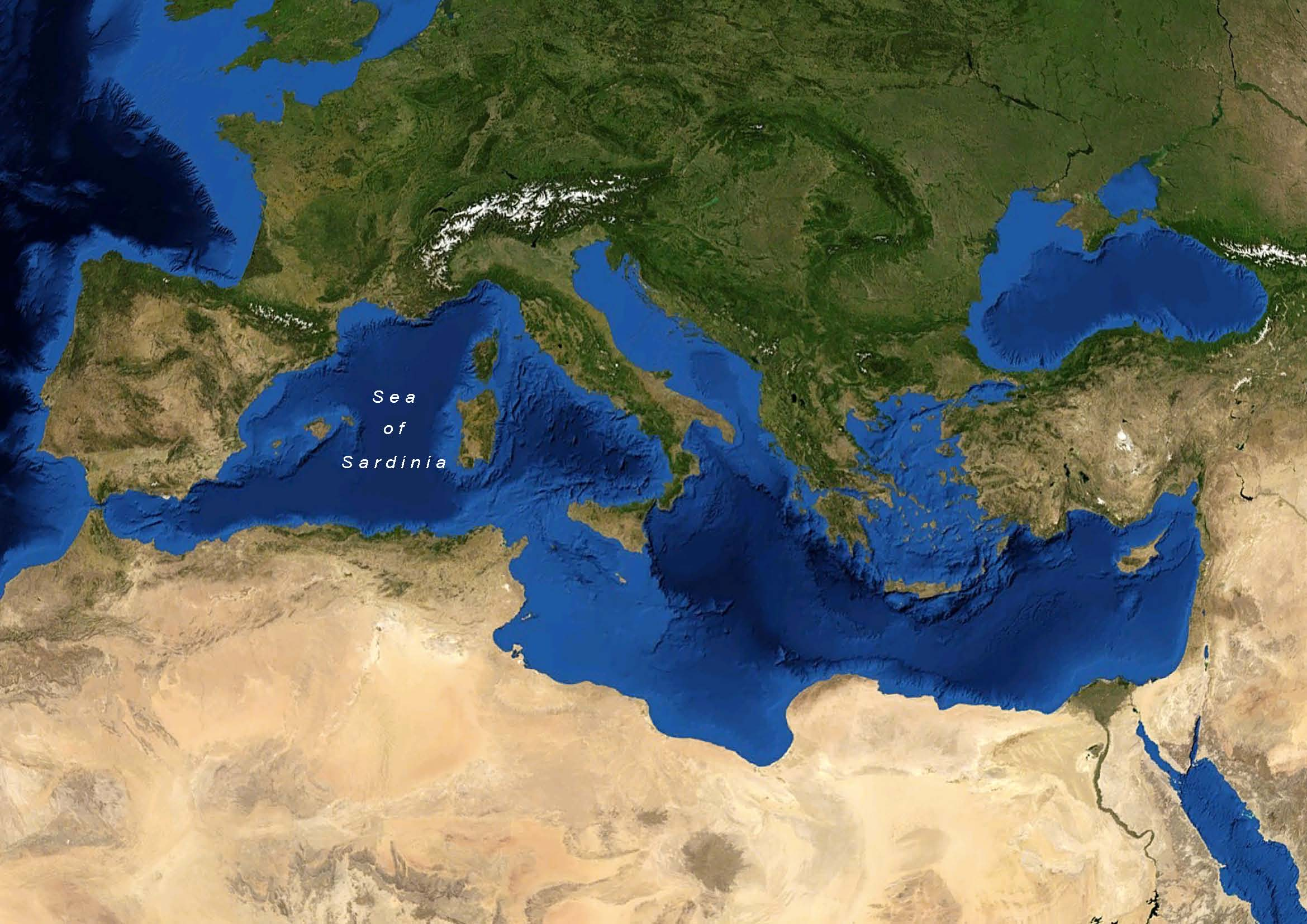
- Map of the Sea of Sardinia
- Interactive map of Sea of Sardinia
- Location: Balearic Islands, Sardinia
- Coordinates: 40°N 6°E
- Type: Sea
- Primary inflows: Algerian Current
- Primary outflows: Northern Current
- Basin countries: Italy, Spain
- Surface area: 120,000 km^{2} (46,000 sq mi)
- Average depth: 1,000 m (3,300 ft)
- Max. depth: 3,000 m (9,800 ft)
- Water volume: 50,000 km^{3} (12,000 cu mi)
- Max. temperature: 26 °C (79 °F)
- Min. temperature: 13 °C (55 °F)

The Sea of Sardinia is a body of water in the Mediterranean Sea between the Spanish archipelago of Balearic Islands and the Italian island of Sardinia.

The deepest point is at some 3,000 m, some 150 km south-east of the island of Menorca.

== Recognition ==
The International Hydrographic Organization defines the area as generic Mediterranean Sea, in the Western Basin. It does not recognize the label 'Sea of Sardinia'.

== See also ==
- Balearic Sea
