= Antoni Ballero =

Italian poet and lawyer

Antoni Ballero de Càndia (born 1927 in Alghero, Sardinia, died 9 March 2009) was an Italian poet, lawyer, and a member of La Palmavera society.

== Career ==
Almost all of his works are in Algherese dialect, a variety of the Catalan language spoken in Sardinia.

== Works ==
- Música de serenades (1951)
- Vida (1951)
- Alghero, Cara de roses (1961)
