= Alghero =

City in Sardinia, Italy

Alghero L'Alguer (Catalan) S'Alighera (Sardinian)
- Comune
- Città di Alghero (Italian); Ciutat de l'Alguer (Catalan)
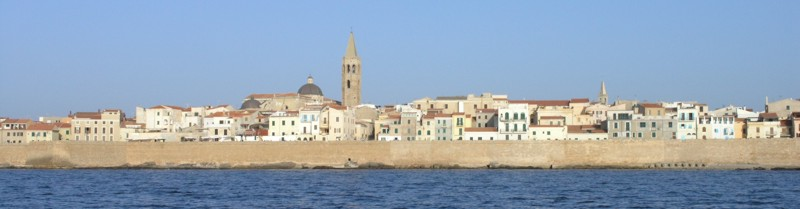
- 16th-century Catalan Crown city walls

- Flag Coat of arms

- Location within Sardinia
- Coordinates: 40°33′36″N 08°18′54″E
- Country: Italy
- Region: Sardinia
- Metropolitan city: Sassari
- Frazioni: Fertilia, Guardia Grande, I Piani, Loretella, Maristella, Sa Segada, Santa Maria La Palma, Tramariglio, Villassunta

Government
  - Mayor: Raimondo Cacciotto (Greens and Left Alliance)

Area
  - Total: 225.40 km^{2} (87.03 sq mi)
- Elevation: 7 m (23 ft)

Population (2026)
  - Total: 41,765
  - Density: 185.29/km^{2} (479.91/sq mi)
- Demonyms: Algheresi (Italian); Algueresos (Catalan)
- Time zone: UTC+1 (CET)
  - Summer (DST): UTC+2 (CEST)
- Postal code: 07041
- Dialing code: 079
- Patron saint: St. Michael
- Saint day: 29 September
- Website: Official website

Alghero (Italian: [alˈɡɛːro]; Algherese: L'Alguer [lalˈɣe]; Sardinian: S'Alighera [saliˈɣɛɾa]; Sassarese: L'Aliera [laˈljɛːɾa]) is a city and comune (municipality) in the Metropolitan City of Sassari in the northwest of the autonomous island region of Sardinia in Italy, next to the Mediterranean Sea. With a population of 41,765, it is the 5th-largest city in Sardinia.

The population is noted for having retained the language of the Crown of Aragon rulers from the end of the Middle Ages, when Sardinia was part of the Crown of Aragon; hence, Algherese (the Catalan dialect spoken there) is officially recognized as a minority language.

Alghero is the third university center in the island, coming after Cagliari and Sassari. It hosts the headquarters of the Università degli Studi di Sassari's Architecture and Design department.

== Etymology ==
The city's name comes from Aleguerium, which is a mediaeval Latin word meaning "stagnation of algae" (Posidonia oceanica).

== History ==
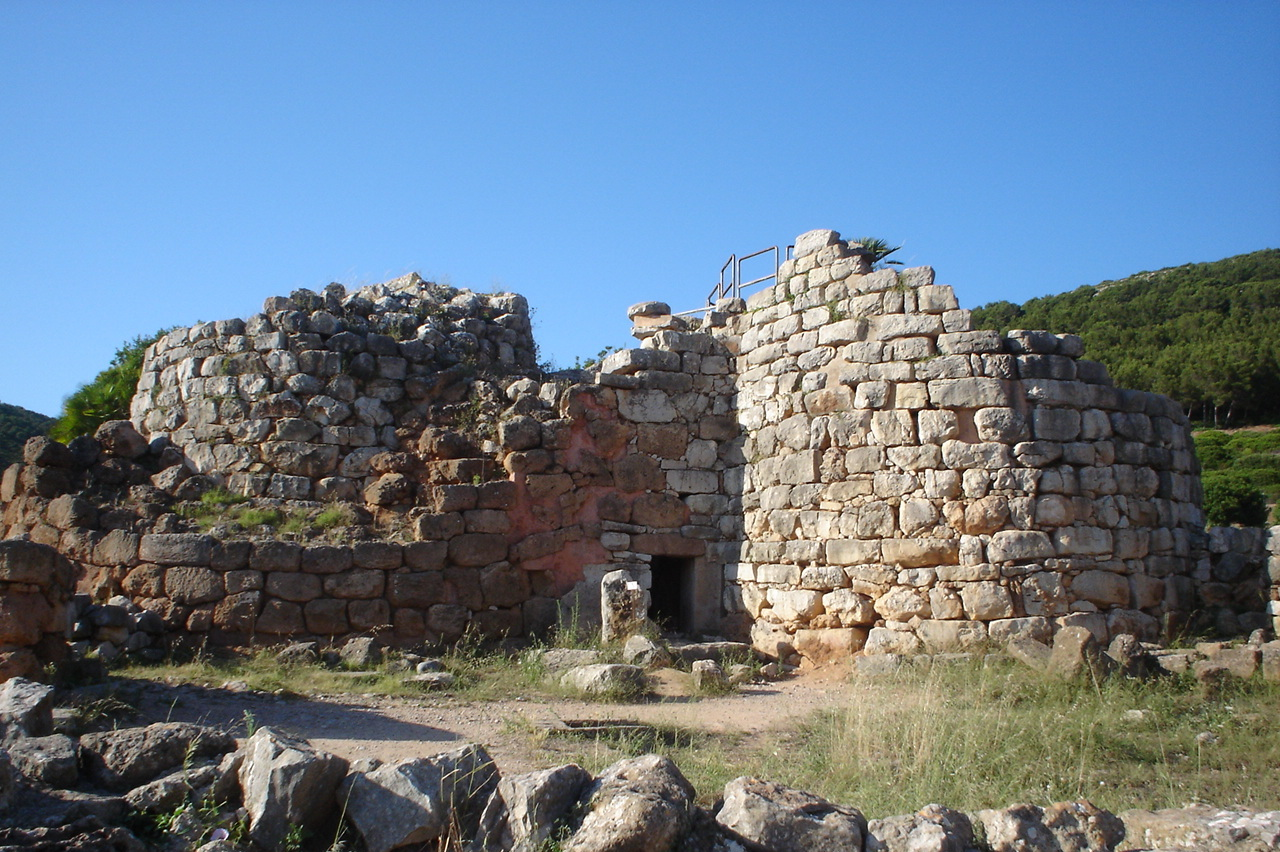
Nuraghe Palmavera near Alghero.

The area of modern-day Alghero has been settled since pre-historic times. The Ozieri culture was present here in the 4th millennium BC (Necropolis of Anghelu Ruju), while the Nuraghe civilization settled in the area around 1,500 BC.

The Phoenicians arrived by the 8th century BC and the metalworking town of Sant'Imbenia – in the area of later Alghero –, with a mixed Phoenician and Nuragic population, engaged in trade with the Etruscans on the Italian mainland.

Due to its strategic position on the Mediterranean Sea, Alghero had been developed into a fortified port town by 1102, built by the Genoese Doria family. The Dorias ruled Alghero for centuries, apart from a brief period under the rule of Pisa between 1283 and 1284. Alghero's population later grew because of the arrival of Catalan colonists. In the early 16th century, Alghero received papal recognition as a bishopric and the status of King's City (ciutat de l'Alguer) and developed economically.

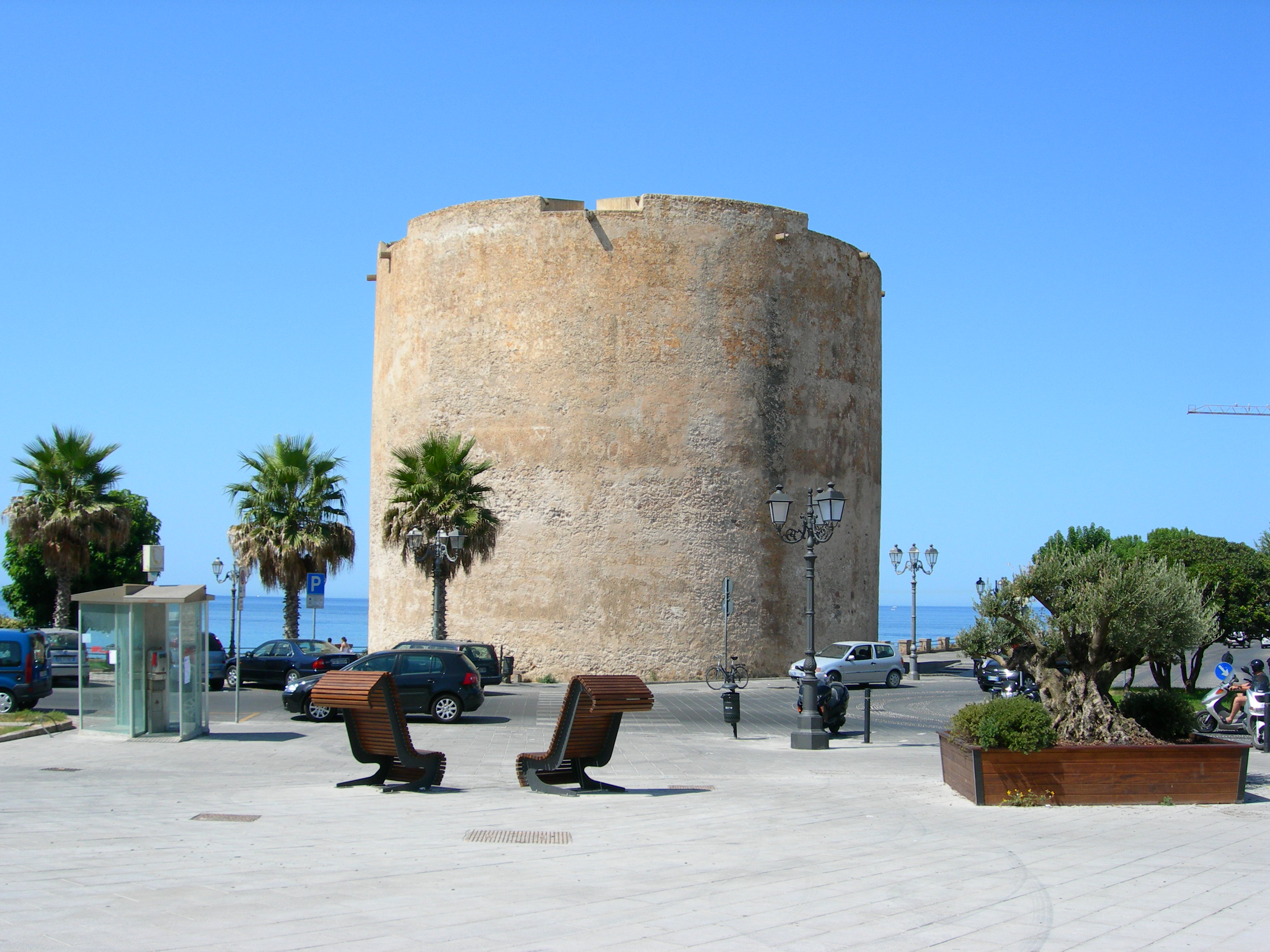
Sulis Tower

Historically, the city was founded in the early twelfth century between 1102 and 1112, when the noble Doria family of Genoa was allowed to build the first historical nucleus into an empty section of the coast of the parish of Nulauro in Judicate of Torres (Sassari). For two centuries it remained in the orbit of the Maritime Republics, first and foremost the Genoese, apart from 1283 to 1284 when the Pisans were able to control it for a year. It is plausible that at this time the town shared, given its commercial and multi-ethnic nature, a language similar to the nascent Sassarese.

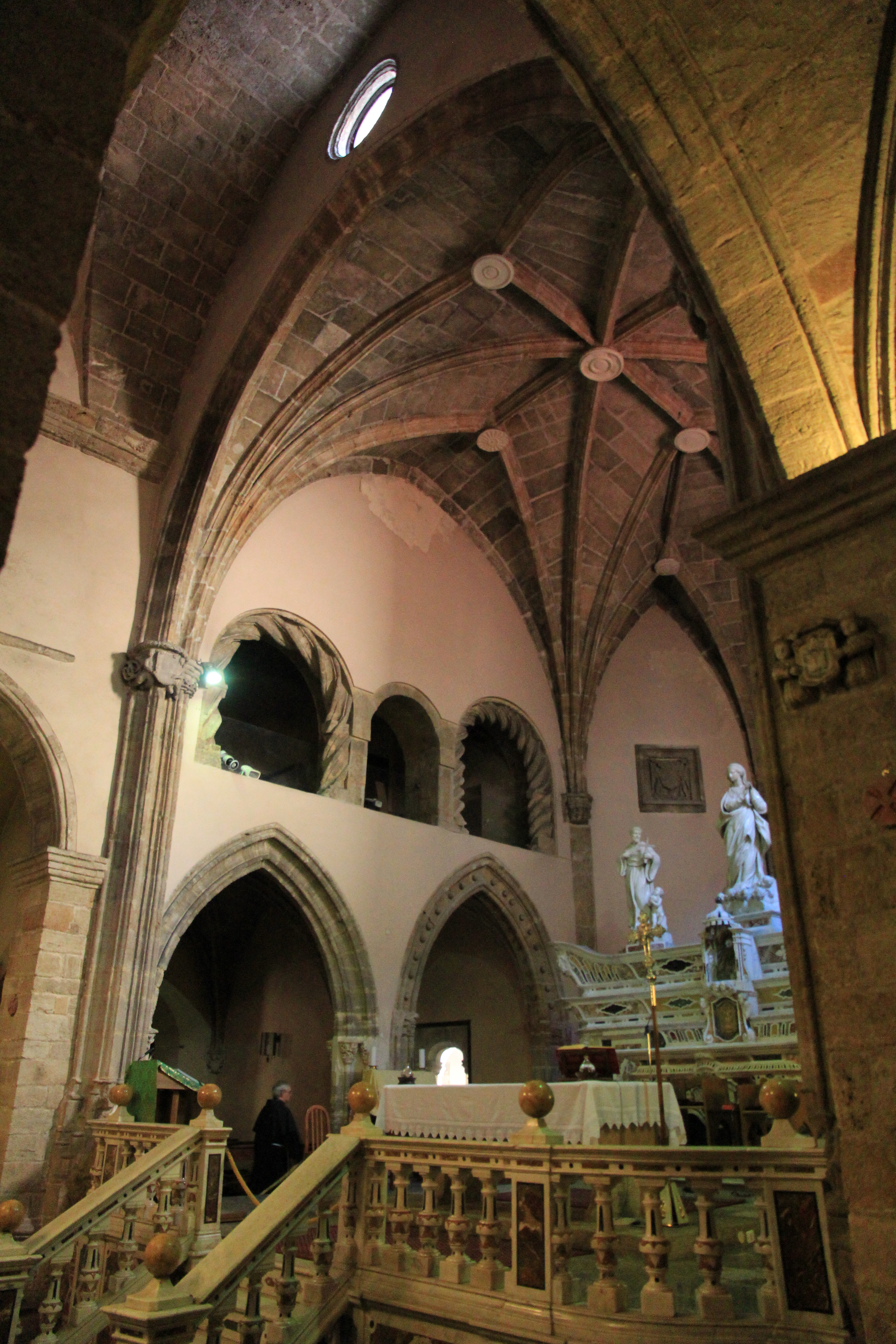
San Francesco Church

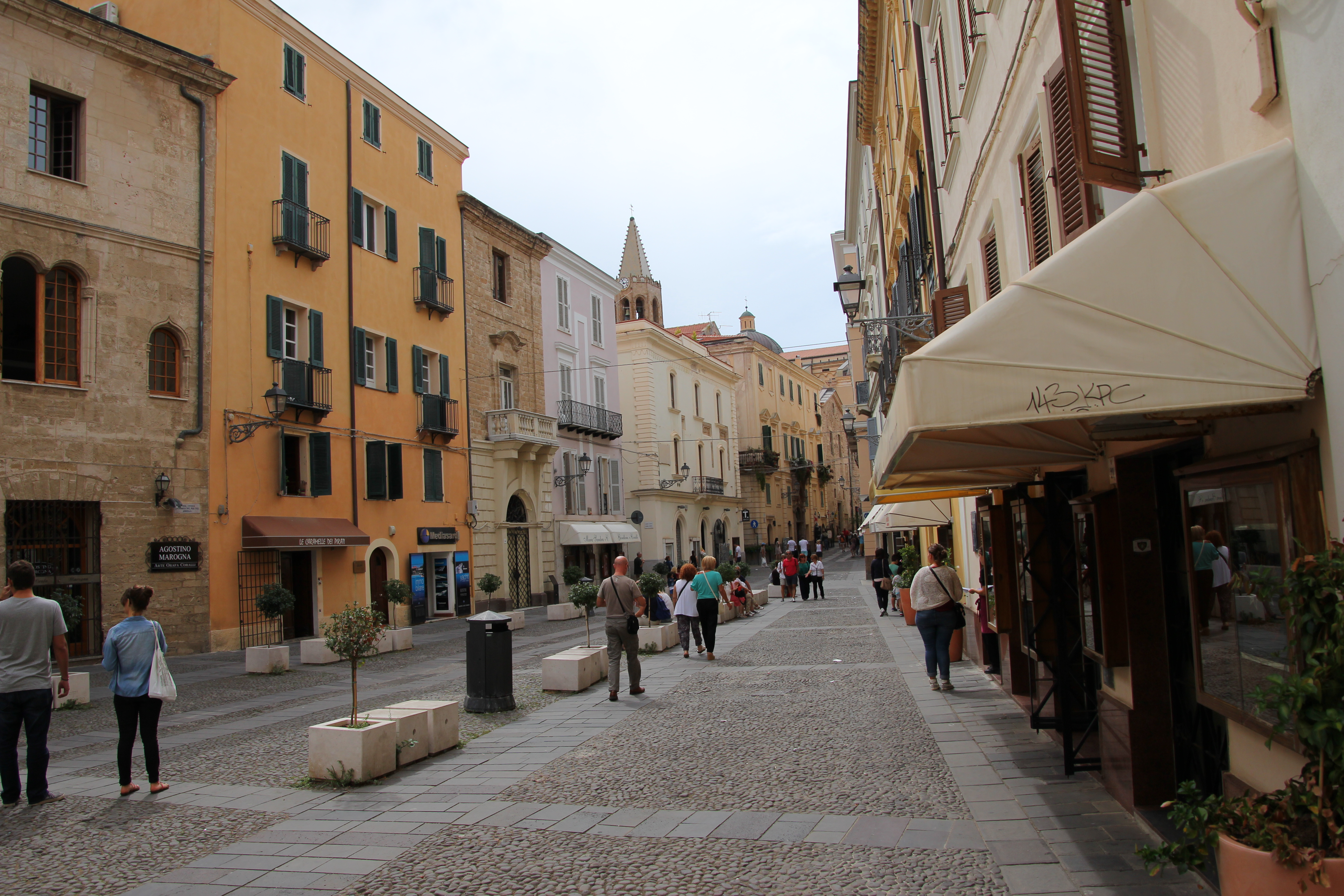
Civic Square

The town was conquered by the Crown of Aragon, at the behest of Peter IV of Aragon (r. 1336–1387), who later actively promoted colonisation of the town and the surrounding area, sending numerous families from different counties and provinces of the then Crown of Aragon, including Valencia, Majorca, Catalonia and Aragon. These were granted enticing privileges and, in fact, replaced the original population, some of whom were sent to the Iberian Peninsula and Majorca as slaves. The dialects these families spoke in Alghero were all very similar and derived from the same linguistic family. Over time, it settled on its current form of Catalan, despite the subsequent decline of the Crown of Aragon.

The Aragonese were followed by the Spanish Habsburgs, who ruled until 1702 and continued expanding the town.

In 1720, Alghero, along with the rest of Sardinia, was handed over to the Piedmont-based House of Savoy, upon the arrival of which a policy of Italianization was commenced. In 1821, a famine led to a revolt by the population, which was bloodily suppressed. At the end of the same century, Alghero was de-militarised.

During the Fascist era, part of the surrounding marshes were reclaimed and the suburbs of Fertilia and S.M. La Palma were founded. During World War II (1943), Alghero was bombed, and its historical centre suffered heavy damage. The presence of malaria in the countryside was finally overcome in the 1950s. Since then, Alghero has become a popular tourist destination.

== Geography ==
Alghero is located on the northwestern coast of Sardinia, along the bay named after the city. In the north of the urban area, there is the Nurra plain; to the northwest, the karstic systems of Capo Caccia, Punta Giglio and Monte Doglia. The south is built mainly by mountains and the plateaus of Villanova Monteleone and Bosa.

=== Climate ===
The climate at Alghero is mild due to the presence of the sea, which attenuates the temperatures especially during the summer. Summers are warm, like most parts of the Mediterranean. Winters are also mild, with the thermometers showing negative Celsius temperatures just a few days per year.

Climate data for Alghero (Fertilia) (1981–2010)
| Month | Jan | Feb | Mar | Apr | May | Jun | Jul | Aug | Sep | Oct | Nov | Dec | Year |
|---|---|---|---|---|---|---|---|---|---|---|---|---|---|
| Mean daily maximum °C (°F) | 14.1 (57.4) | 14.9 (58.8) | 17.2 (63.0) | 19.8 (67.6) | 24.7 (76.5) | 28.4 (83.1) | 31.7 (89.1) | 32.0 (89.6) | 28.2 (82.8) | 24.3 (75.7) | 18.6 (65.5) | 15.1 (59.2) | 22.4 (72.4) |
| Daily mean °C (°F) | 9.7 (49.5) | 10.2 (50.4) | 12.2 (54.0) | 14.7 (58.5) | 19.0 (66.2) | 22.5 (72.5) | 25.8 (78.4) | 26.1 (79.0) | 22.8 (73.0) | 19.4 (66.9) | 14.4 (57.9) | 11.0 (51.8) | 17.3 (63.2) |
| Mean daily minimum °C (°F) | 5.3 (41.5) | 5.4 (41.7) | 7.1 (44.8) | 9.5 (49.1) | 13.2 (55.8) | 16.8 (62.2) | 19.8 (67.6) | 20.1 (68.2) | 17.3 (63.1) | 14.4 (57.9) | 10.1 (50.2) | 6.9 (44.4) | 12.2 (53.9) |
| Average precipitation mm (inches) | 54.6 (2.15) | 43.1 (1.70) | 41.3 (1.63) | 52.7 (2.07) | 41.3 (1.63) | 19.8 (0.78) | 5.1 (0.20) | 7.6 (0.30) | 38.9 (1.53) | 74.7 (2.94) | 108.6 (4.28) | 75.7 (2.98) | 563.4 (22.19) |
Source: Sistema nazionale protezione ambiente

Climate data for Capo Caccia (1991–2020)
| Month | Jan | Feb | Mar | Apr | May | Jun | Jul | Aug | Sep | Oct | Nov | Dec | Year |
|---|---|---|---|---|---|---|---|---|---|---|---|---|---|
| Mean daily maximum °C (°F) | 12.9 (55.2) | 12.9 (55.2) | 14.8 (58.6) | 17.1 (62.8) | 20.9 (69.6) | 24.8 (76.6) | 27.5 (81.5) | 28.1 (82.6) | 24.8 (76.6) | 21.8 (71.2) | 17.4 (63.3) | 14.1 (57.4) | 19.8 (67.6) |
| Daily mean °C (°F) | 11.0 (51.8) | 10.7 (51.3) | 12.3 (54.1) | 14.3 (57.7) | 17.8 (64.0) | 21.6 (70.9) | 24.3 (75.7) | 25.1 (77.2) | 22.0 (71.6) | 19.2 (66.6) | 15.2 (59.4) | 12.1 (53.8) | 17.1 (62.8) |
| Mean daily minimum °C (°F) | 9.0 (48.2) | 8.4 (47.1) | 9.8 (49.6) | 11.6 (52.9) | 14.8 (58.6) | 18.5 (65.3) | 21.2 (70.2) | 22.0 (71.6) | 19.3 (66.7) | 16.6 (61.9) | 13.0 (55.4) | 10.1 (50.2) | 14.5 (58.1) |
| Average precipitation mm (inches) | 43.4 (1.71) | 38.7 (1.52) | 31.1 (1.22) | 36.2 (1.43) | 37.0 (1.46) | 16.5 (0.65) | 4.2 (0.17) | 7.7 (0.30) | 41.0 (1.61) | 61.8 (2.43) | 82.2 (3.24) | 57.7 (2.27) | 457.5 (18.01) |
| Average precipitation days (≥ 1.0 mm) | 7.0 | 6.8 | 5.6 | 5.8 | 4.2 | 2.0 | 0.6 | 1.2 | 4.4 | 6.4 | 9.3 | 7.9 | 61.2 |
| Average relative humidity (%) | 80.5 | 78.1 | 77.4 | 77.2 | 75.5 | 74.0 | 72.2 | 71.3 | 74.5 | 76.3 | 77.6 | 79.1 | 76.1 |
Source: NCEI

== Demographics ==
Historical population
| Year | Pop. | ±% |
|---|---|---|
| 1861 | 8,831 | — |
| 1871 | 9,988 | +13.1% |
| 1881 | 9,989 | +0.0% |
| 1901 | 10,741 | +7.5% |
| 1911 | 11,860 | +10.4% |
| 1921 | 12,555 | +5.9% |
| 1931 | 13,737 | +9.4% |
| 1936 | 15,998 | +16.5% |
| 1951 | 21,374 | +33.6% |
| 1961 | 26,688 | +24.9% |
| 1971 | 32,187 | +20.6% |
| 1981 | 36,508 | +13.4% |
| 1991 | 39,026 | +6.9% |
| 2001 | 38,404 | −1.6% |
| 2011 | 40,641 | +5.8% |
| 2021 | 42,458 | +4.5% |
Source: ISTAT

As of 2026, the population is 41,765, of which 48.1% are male, and 51.9% are female. Minors make up 11.1% of the population, and seniors make up 29.3%.

=== Immigration ===
As of 2025, immigrants make up 6.6% of the population. The 5 largest foreign countries of birth are Romania, Germany, France, the United Kingdom, and Bangladesh.

=== Language ===
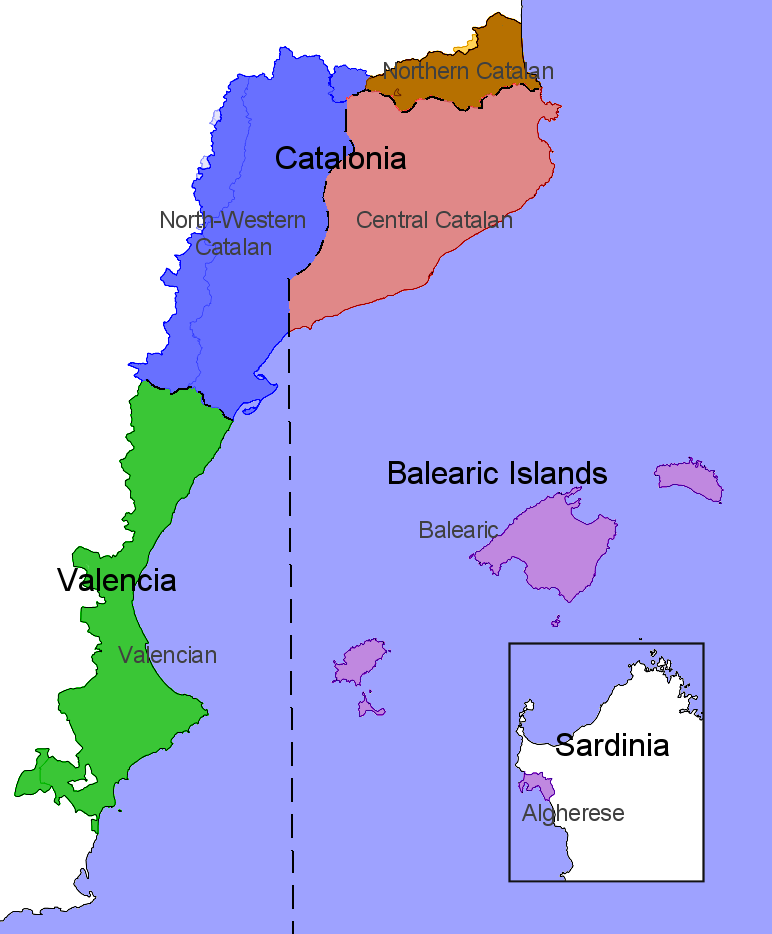
Map of the Catalan speaking language.

A variety of Catalan is spoken in Alghero, introduced when Catalans settled in the town. Catalan was replaced as the official language of the Island by Spanish in the 17th century, then by Italian. The most recent linguistic research showed that 24.1% of the people have Algherese Catalan as a mother tongue, which is habitually spoken by 18.5% and taught to the children by 8% of the population, whereas 88.2% have some understanding of the language. Since 1997, Catalan has had official recognition and national and regional laws grant its right to be used in the city. Currently, there has been a revival of the arts in Algherese Catalan, with singers such as Franca Masu performing original compositions in the language.

Following a rural exodus from the surrounding villages towards the city, much of the population speaks or has some proficiency in Sardinian, in addition to Italian and Catalan. Historically, the spread of Catalan was limited to the city and part of the coast, as the surrounding countryside has always been populated by Sardinian-speaking people.

== Culture ==
The ancient part of Alghero shows many characteristics of Catalan medieval architecture. The 'algueresos' (Alghero inhabitants) usually refer to their city as 'Barceloneta' – 'little Barcelona' – because of their ancestry and fraternity with the Catalan capital. This Catalan population was the subject of an 1888 book by Eduardo Toda y Güell: Un poble català d'Itàlia: l'Alguer, which restarted the connection between Catalonia and Alghero. The cuisine is a blend of Catalan cuisine and Sardinian cuisine.

== Main sights ==
Map of city center

The many historical dominances that occurred in Alghero have created a rich variety of monuments, buildings and sights. Starting from the Neolithic period (from which many settlements remain), up to the current day, Alghero has become a tourist destination; this is only because of its coast and natural beauties but also because of a fairly well-preserved patrimony.

=== Archeological sites ===
Several archeological sites out of the urban area: the Anghelu Ruju necropolis, the Santu Pedru hill, the Villa Romana of Santa Imbenia or even the Purissima. Many nuraghi in some other points as Palmavera are also well preserved and open to visitors.

=== Ramparts ===
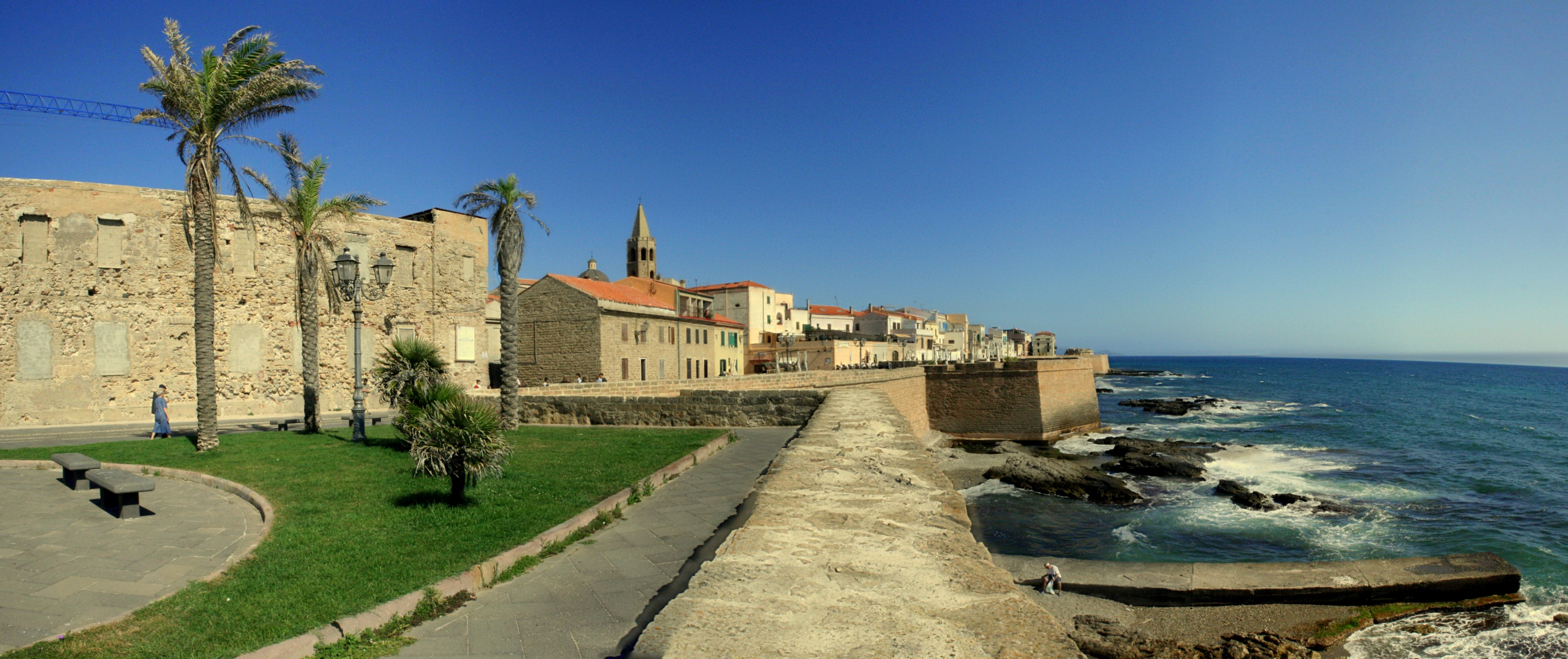
Sea view from the Muralla

The first rampart system looks back to the 13th century and was imported from the Genovese system. In 1354, the city was occupied by Catalans, who restored and expanded the defensive system, back then in bad condition. Some features from the old walls were respected, but Ferdinand the Catholic, who wanted to grant more protection to the city, built the majority of them in the 16th century. Along the walls, seven towers and three forts are found.

=== Religious architecture ===
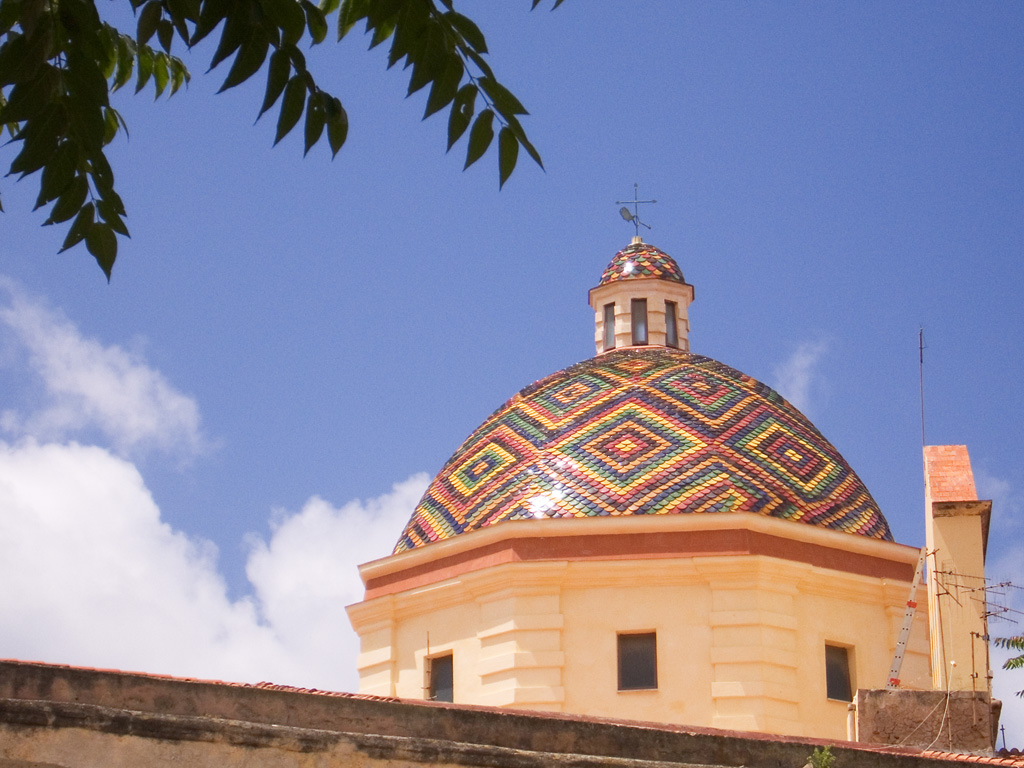
Saint Michael's Dome

- Alghero Cathedral (Cattedrale di Santa Maria Immacolata di Alghero) is the seat of the Roman Catholic Diocese of Alghero-Bosa (initially bishopric of Alghero). Construction started in 1570, and although it was opened in 1593, it was not until 1730 that it was finished and consecrated. The original church was in the Catalan-Gothic style, as can be seen in the five chapels of the presbytery, which also include the base of the bell tower. The nave and the two aisles are of late Renaissance style. In the 20th century a Neo-Classical narthex was added to the façade, radically altering its appearance.
- The church of St. Francis (1360, rebuilt in the late 16th century). Original Catalan-Gothic parts can be seen over the high altar, the presbytery chapels and the San Sacramento Chapel. The bell tower is from the first half of the 16th century.
- The church of St. Michael.
- The Madonna del Santo Rosario.

=== Others ===
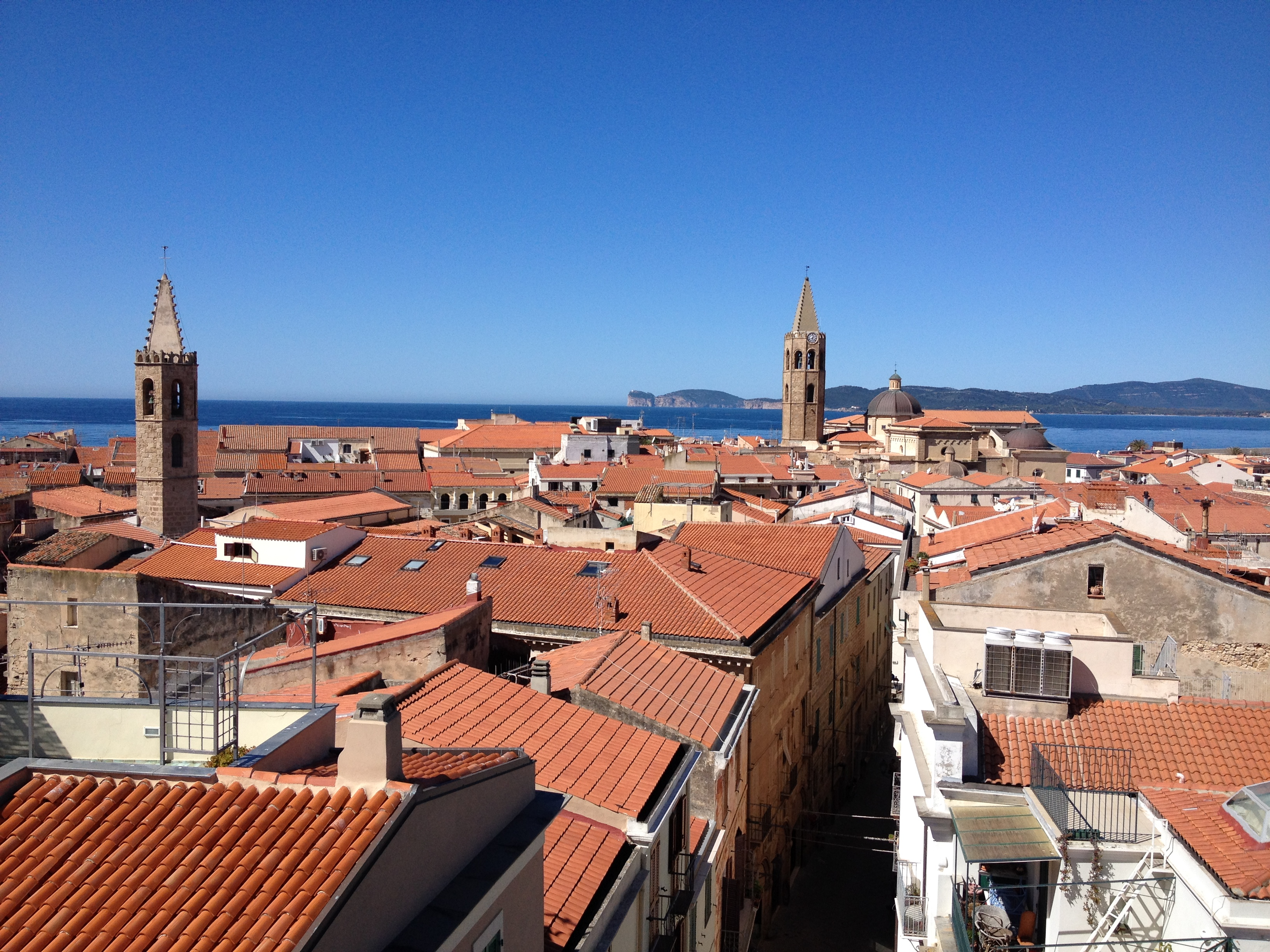
View from the Porta Terra tower

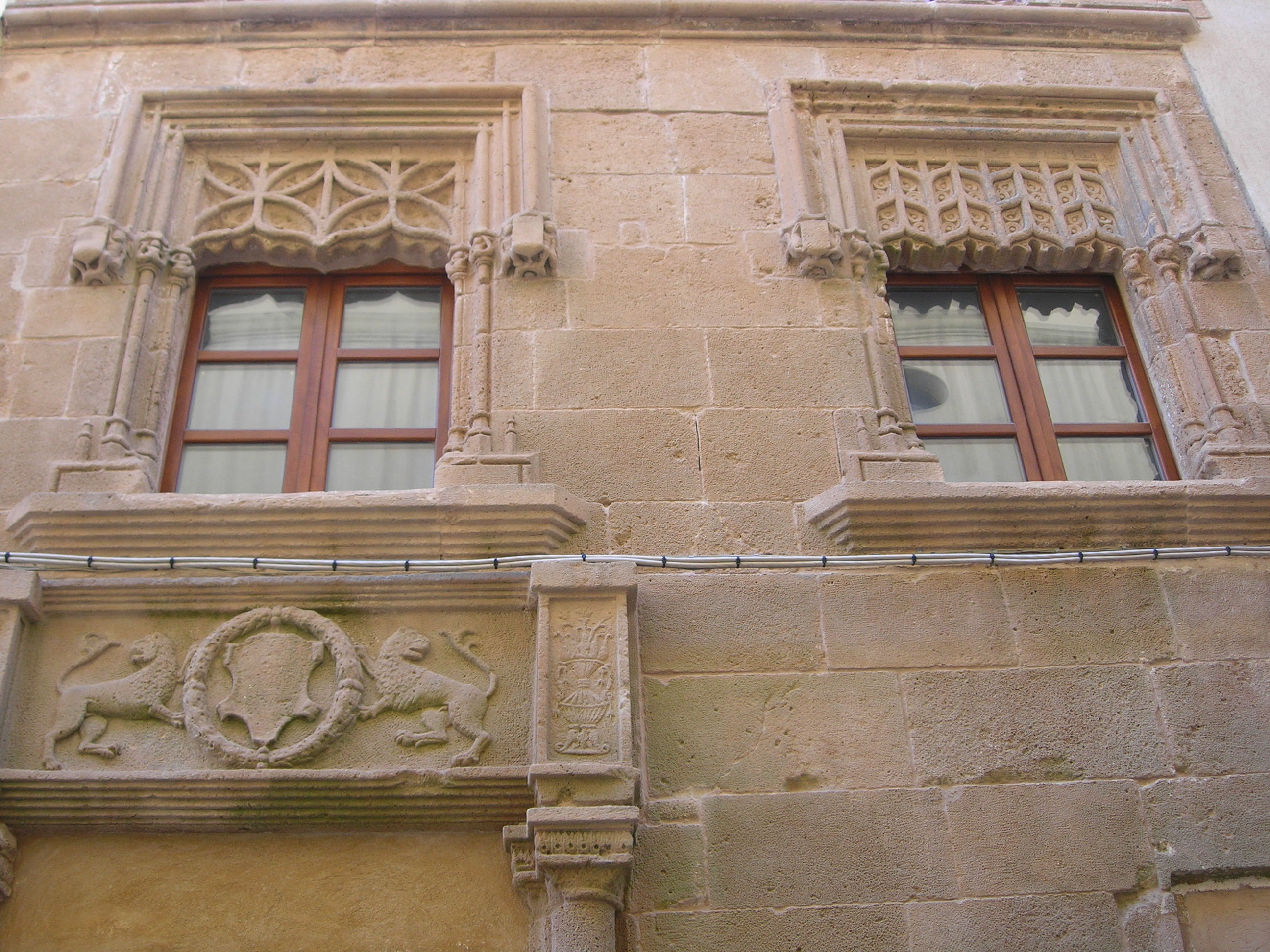
Machín palace

- The Torre del Portal, built at the expense of the Jewish community in Alghero in 1360, and the Tower dell'Esperò Reial (16th century).
- Palazzo D'Albis (16th century), a typical example of the Aragonese architecture of the 16th century. In October 1541 it housed the Emperor Charles V.
- Neptune's Grotto, a large cave discovered in the 19th century.
- Palazzo Carcassona

The coral of Alghero is among the finest in the Mediterranean with a reputation for quantity, quality, compression and ruby red color. Indeed, this coral is one of the most important economic aspects of the territory, giving this stretch of the coast its name, the Riviera del Corallo. The coat of arms and flag of Alghero include a branch of the valuable red coral on a foundation of rock.

== Territory ==
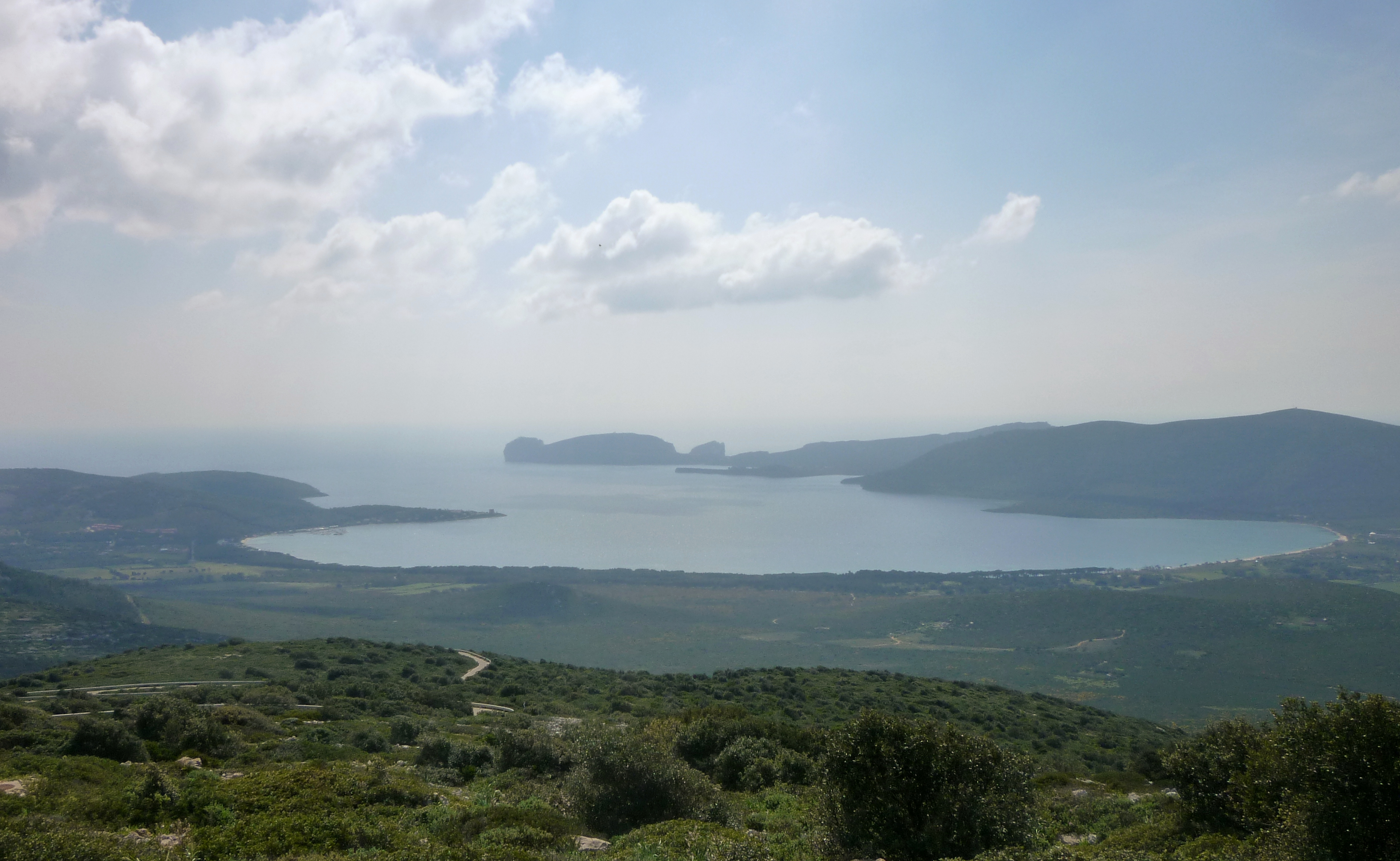
Porto Conte

=== Villages and hamlets ===
The territory around Alghero territory features several villages and hamlets; these communities feature their own churches and partial services and shops.

- Fertilia – Well known for the origin of the foundation city at Fascism era and for the airport
- Santa Maria La palma – Well known to be the location of the famous winery Cantina sociale
- Maristella – Porto Conte
- Tramariglio
- Guardia grande
- Villa Assunta
- Sa Segada
- I piani
- Tanca Farrà

Alghero's landscape is also one of the town's noteworthy features. It has several beaches, bays and natural parks on the shoreline. Capo Caccia promontory and its lighthouse are landmarks.

=== Coasts and beaches ===
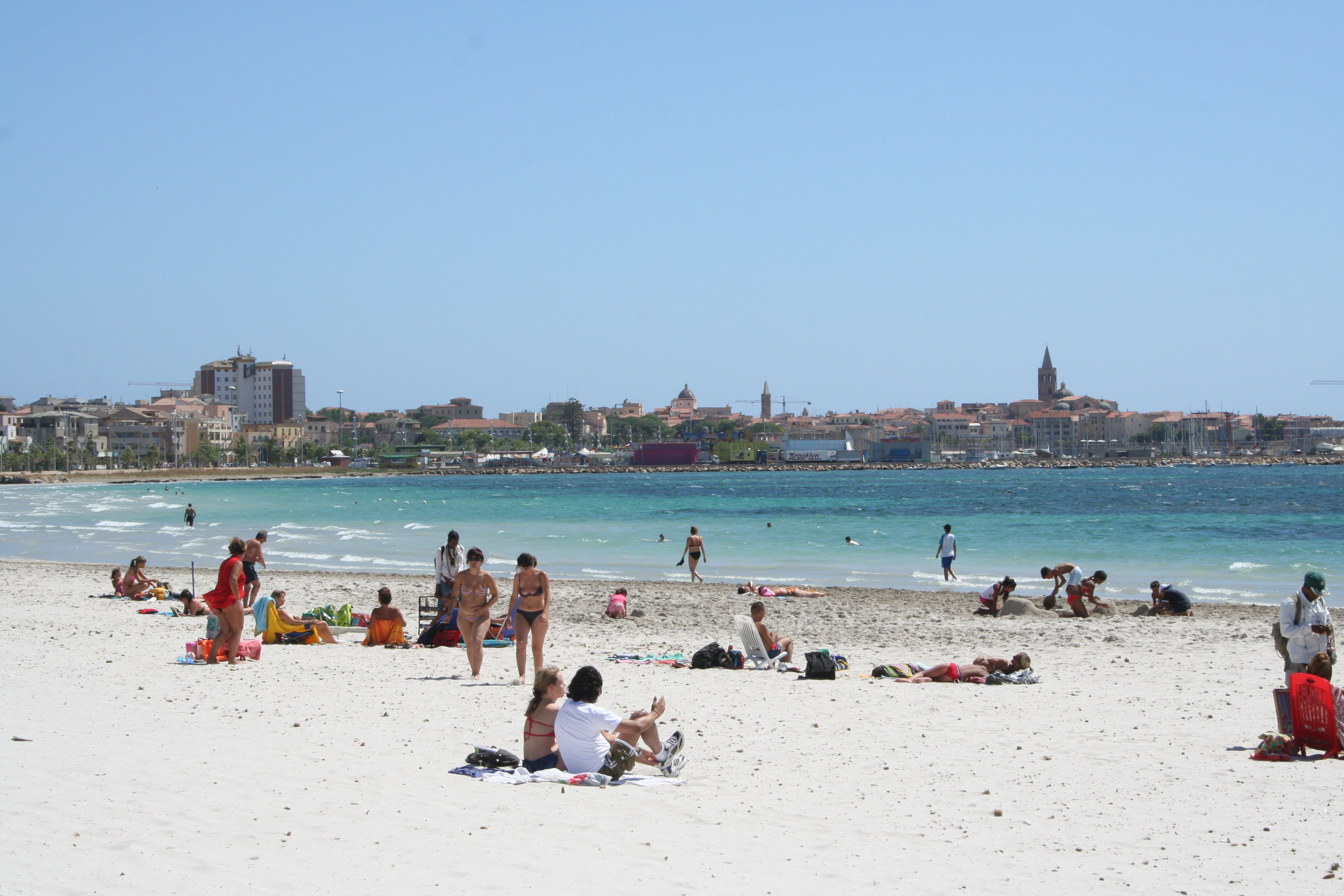
Lido Beach

- Spiaggia di Poglina o della Speranza
- Cala Burantino
- San Giovanni
- Lido
- Maria Pia
- Le Bombarde
- Lazzaretto
- Mugoni
- La Stalla
- Le Bombarde
- Punta Negra
- Cala Dragunara

=== Natural parks ===
- Area naturale marina protetta Capo Caccia – Isola Piana
- Parco regionale di Porto Conte

== Transport ==
Alghero is well-connected. Roads lead to Sassari, the province's capital. The main port for passengers is 30 kilometers away and Alghero – Fertilia airport has national and international flights.

=== Roads ===
- Strada statale 127bis Settentrionale Sarda, leading to Porto Conte (north) and Sassari (east).
- Strada statale 291 della Nurra, from Fertilia to Sassari.
- Strada provinciale 42 dei Due Mari, reaching the port in Porto Torres.
- Strada provinciale 105 Alghero-Bosa, panoramical road, it starts in the southern part of Alghero and goes along the shore to Bosa.
- Strada statale 291 dir del Calich, assuring the connection to and from the airport.

=== Trains ===
Alghero has a train station in the Pietraia neighborhood, Sant’Agostino, with daily trains to Sassari by Azienda Regionale Sarda Trasporti.

=== Port ===
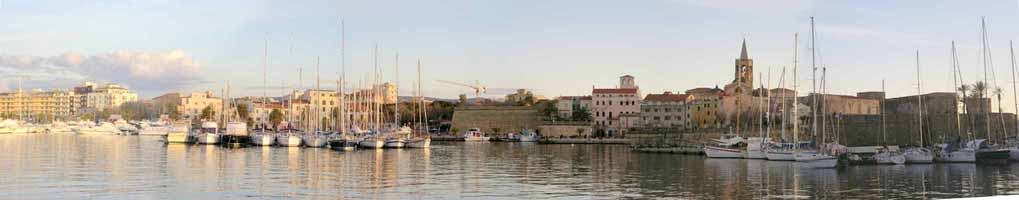
Port of Alghero

There is a leisure and fishing port in the heart of the city. Passenger traffic is handled by Porto Torres, some 30 kilometers north. There are ferry services from there to Genoa, Barcelona and Civitavecchia.

=== Airport ===
The Alghero-Fertilia "Riviera del Corallo" Airport is 10 kilometers from the centre near Fertilia. It is the principal connection with the rest of Italy and Europe. There is an hourly bus service to Fertilia and the centre of Alghero.

== In literature ==
In the 1930s, the Swedish writer Amelie Posse Brazdova wrote a book entitled Sardinia Side Show. In the book, Brazdova told the complete story of two years she spent "interned" in Alghero's old town during World War I.

== Sport events ==
- Scala Piccada (motor racing)
- Rally Italia Sardegna – several editions from 2004 to 2020 (WRC – motor racing)
- Gara del Miglio marino (swimming)
- Italian Welter Weights Championship (boxing)
- Trofeo Tore Burruni (boxing)
- Regata di Sant'Elm (lateen)
- Trofeo Sant Joan (Sailing)
- International Women's Judo Tournament (Jūdō)
- Sardinian Open Wheelchair Tennis (wheelchair tennis)
- Settimana Ciclistica Italiana 2021 (road cycling)
- Giro di Sardegna - several editions (road cycling)
- Giro d'Italia - 2007 and 2017 editions (road cycling)
- 2007 Davis Cup, Italy-Luxembourg (tennis)

== Twin towns and sister cities ==
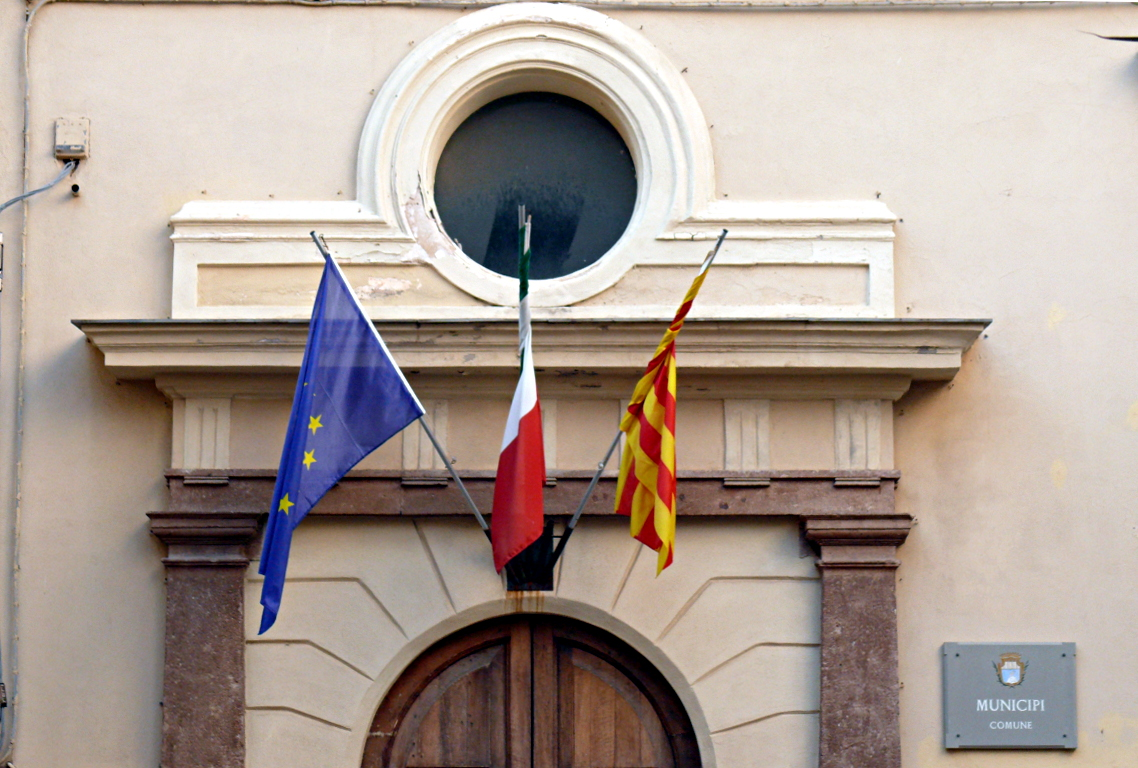
Town Hall of Alghero with the flags of the European Union, Italy and Catalonia

- Balaguer, Catalonia
- Tarragona, Catalonia
- Palma de Mallorca, Balearic Islands
- Encamp, Andorra

== Notable people ==
- Antoni Ballero (1927–2009), Italian-Catalan poet
- Giuseppe Larco (1830–1900), Italian businessman and philanthropist

== See also ==
- Diocese of Alghero-Bosa (initially Alghero)
- Alghero–Fertilia Airport
- History of Sardinia
