= Cala Burantino =

Cove in Sardinia, Italy

- Cove
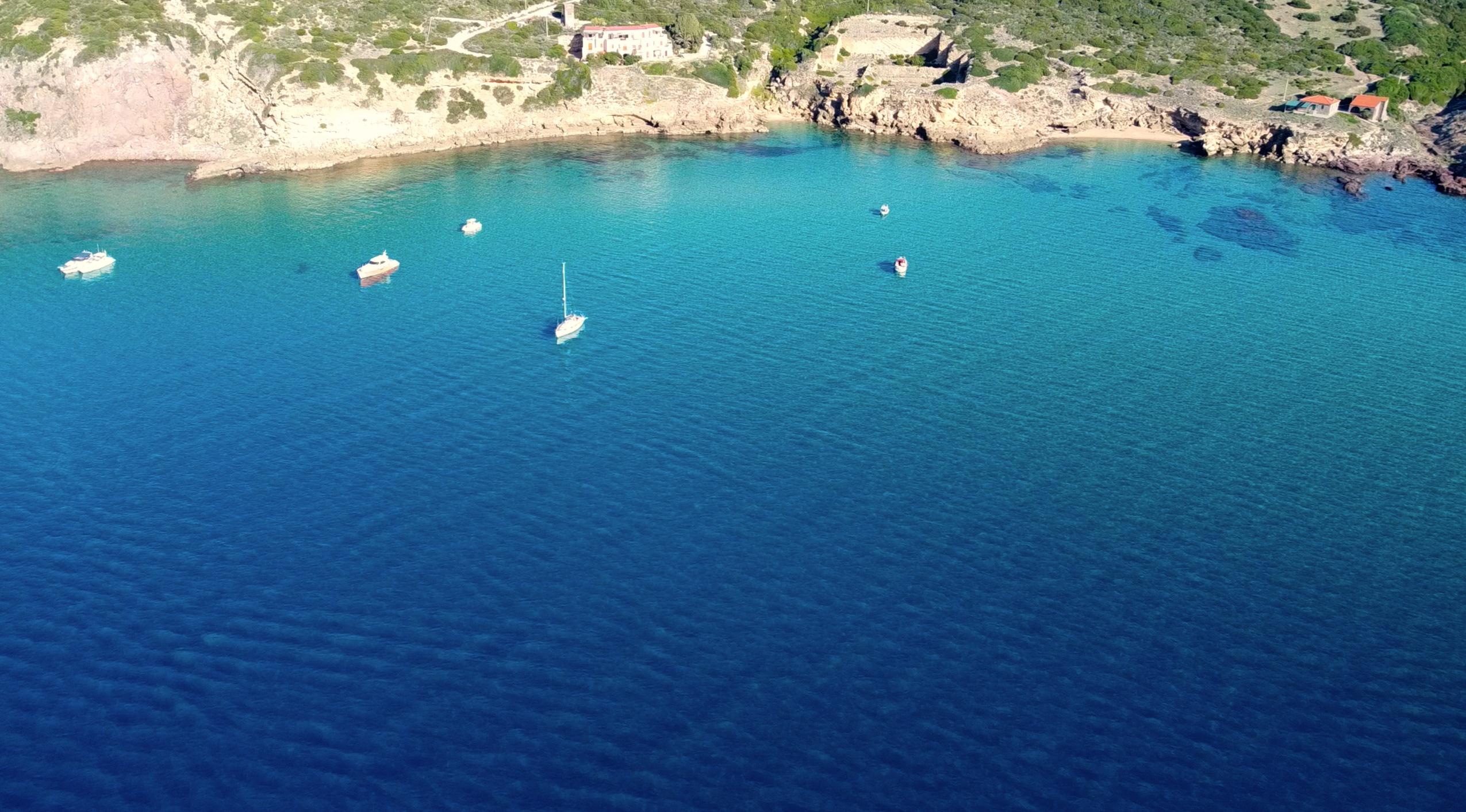
- View of Cala Burantino

- Location of Cala Burantino
- Interactive map of Cala Burantino
- Country: Italy
- Region: Sardinia
- Website: Official Website

Cala Burantino (Italian: [ˈkaːla buranˈtiːno]; Algherese: Burantí [buɾanˈti]) is a cove on the northwest coast of Sardinia. It is located 3.8 nautical miles (7.0 km; 4.4 mi) overland, south of the historic town of Alghero. The surrounding hinterland is almost entirely uninhabited and boasts Mediterranean flora, which is home to various species of wild plants and animals.

== Beaches and coves ==
Cala Burantino boasts two beaches and two small coves, referred to as "caletta" (pronounced [kaˈlɛtta]) in Italian: Caletta Carla and Caletta Arcamyrturs. The sea bed is sandy.

=== Burantino Beach ===
The beach is composed of medium-grain limestone sand and is bordered by a wall of sandstone and volcanic rock. The seabed is sandy and shallow, gradually sloping into deeper waters. Due to its geographical position, visitors can witness the sun setting into the sea, occasionally showcasing the rare phenomenon of the green flash.

=== Villa Wanda Beach ===
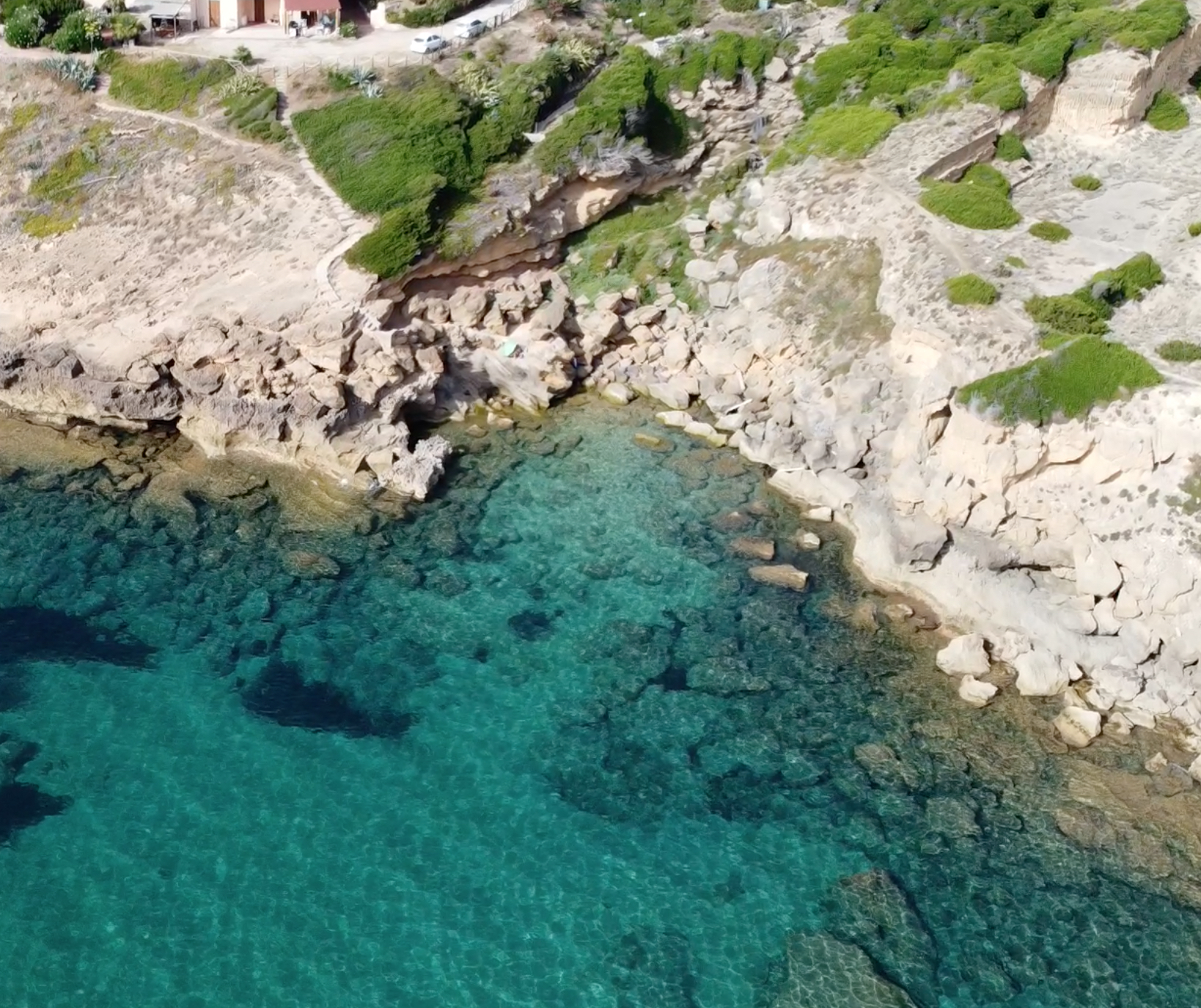
Picture taken in 2023 shows it without a beach

The small cove is encircled by tall sandstone cliffs. The seabed near the shore is shallow but deepens rapidly.

Exposed to storms from the northwest, this is where the Riu Nolli stream meets the sea. These two factors cause the beach's presence to fluctuate over time. Examining aerial photos from 1940 to the present, it becomes evident that the beach in this small cove emerges only in certain years.

Unlike other coves in Cala Burantinu, this one is composed entirely of sandstone, which envelops it completely, allowing the Mediterranean shrubland to extend almost to the water's edge.

== Bolantì Quarry ==
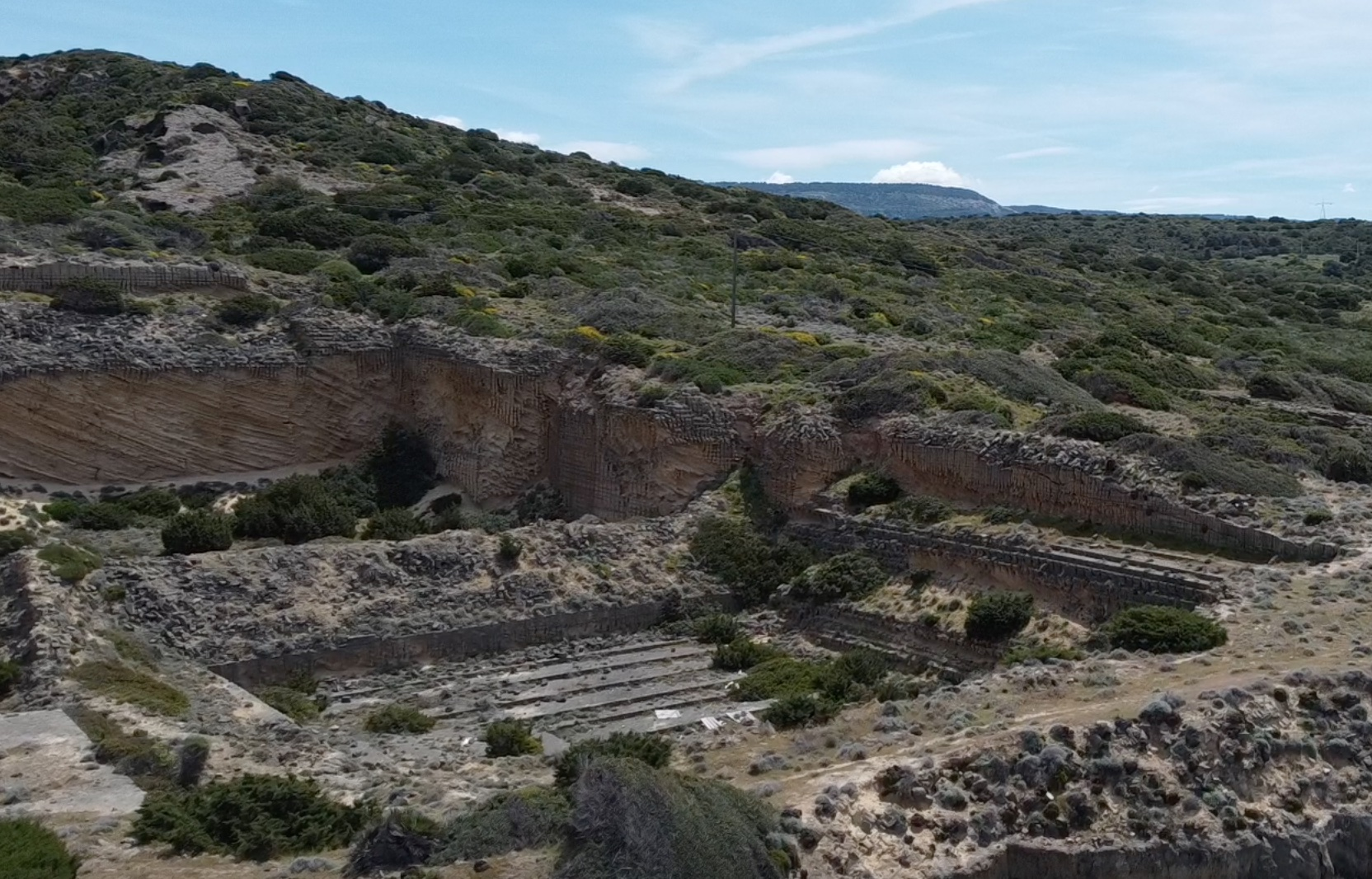
View of the historic Bolantì quarry

The history of Cala Burantino is closely intertwined with the city of Alghero. The Bolantì quarry, which is no longer operational, lies between Villa Wanda Beach and Burantino Beach. This quarry is renowned for producing sandstone blocks, which are also known by their Catalan name, "massacà" (meaning "excavation"). Over the years, these blocks were used to construct the city walls and much of the historic centre.

The coastal route that stretches from Alghero to Bosa has been nicknamed the "massacà road". The Bolantì quarry stands as a testament to the extraction and utilization of sandstone in local architecture. Even today, the "extraction lines" where each block was cut are visible between the quarry's rock layers.
